= France–Germany football rivalry =

Football rivalry between the national football teams of France and Germany

- Location: Europe
- Teams: France; Germany
- First meeting: 15 March 1931; Friendly; France 1–0 Germany
- Latest meeting: 8 June 2025; UEFA Nations League finals Germany 0–2 France

Statistics
- Total meetings: 35
- Most wins: France (16)
- Top scorer: Antoine Griezmann (5 goals)
- All-time series: France: 16; Draw: 8 Germany: 11
- Largest victory: West Germany 5–1 France; Friendly; 27 September 1967

The football rivalry between France and Germany is one of the biggest and most heated association football rivalries in Europe. The teams are among the most successful national teams in the world. Previously, it was mostly a one-sided phenomenon since most German fans considered the Netherlands or Italy to be their traditional footballing rivals until the rise of France from the 1990s onward, but the rivalry really began during the UEFA European Championship in the 2010s decade after a series of mere friendlies in the 1990s to 2000s.

== Background ==
The root of France–Germany rivalry could have dated back from the old tensions between France and German Empire after the capture of Paris by Prussian Army in 1870. Since the end of the war, enmity between France and Germany increased, resulted with military arm race and eventually, set up the World War I. During the beginning of war, a peaceful moment, the Christmas truce, where a peaceful football match between French, British and German soldiers occurred. This was considered the first unofficial match between France and Germany.

The countries first played each other in an official international in 1931 when France defeated the Weimar Republic. However, rivalry soon increased with the German invasion of France, and antagonism persisted until the end of World War II. One of the most notable meetings between the two countries came in the 1982 World Cup semi-final, which ended 3–3 after extra time before West Germany won in a penalty shoot-out. Michel Platini himself declared the match as his "most beautiful game".

== Comparison in major tournaments ==
Key

Denotes which team finished better in that particular competition.
DNQ: Did not qualify.
DNP: Did not participate.
TBD: To be determined.

Tournament	France	Germany	Notes
1930 FIFA World Cup	7th	DNP	
1934 FIFA World Cup	9th	3rd	
1938 FIFA World Cup	6th	10th	Tournament hosted by France.
1950 FIFA World Cup	Withdrew	DNP	
1954 FIFA World Cup	11th	1st	
1958 FIFA World Cup	3rd	4th	In the third-place match, France defeated West Germany 6–3.
Euro 1960	4th	DNP	Tournament hosted by France.
1962 FIFA World Cup	DNQ	7th	
Euro 1964	DNQ		
1966 FIFA World Cup	13th	2nd	
Euro 1968	DNQ		
1970 FIFA World Cup	DNQ	3rd	
Euro 1972	DNQ	1st	
1974 FIFA World Cup	DNQ	1st	Tournament hosted by West Germany.
Euro 1976	DNQ	2nd	
1978 FIFA World Cup	12th	6th	
Euro 1980	DNQ	1st	
1982 FIFA World Cup	4th	2nd	In the semifinals, West Germany defeated France 5–4 on penalties, after the match ended 3-3 after extra time.
Euro 1984	1st	5th	Tournament hosted by France.
1986 FIFA World Cup	3rd	2nd	In the semifinals, West Germany defeated France 2-0.
Euro 1988	DNQ	3rd	Tournament hosted by West Germany.
1990 FIFA World Cup	DNQ	1st	
Euro 1992	6th	2nd	
1994 FIFA World Cup	DNQ	5th	
Euro 1996	4th	1st	
1998 FIFA World Cup	1st	7th	Tournament hosted by France.
Euro 2000	1st	15th	
2002 FIFA World Cup	28th	2nd	
Euro 2004	6th	12th	
2006 FIFA World Cup	2nd	3rd	
Euro 2008	15th	2nd	
2010 FIFA World Cup	29th	3rd	
Euro 2012	8th	4th	
2014 FIFA World Cup	7th	1st	In the quarter-finals, Germany defeated France 1-0.
Euro 2016	2nd	3rd	Tournament hosted by France. In the semifinals, France defeated Germany 2–0.
2018 FIFA World Cup	1st	22nd	
Euro 2020	11th	15th	Tournament hosted by multiple countries; Germany hosted some matches. In the group stage, France defeated Germany 1-0.
2022 FIFA World Cup	2nd	17th	
Euro 2024	4th	5th	Tournament hosted by Germany.
2026 FIFA World Cup	4th	18th	
Euro 2028	TBD	TBD	

== Major encounters ==
=== 1958 FIFA World Cup ===
28 June 1958
17:00 (CET)

France	6–3	West Germany
Fontaine 16', 36', 78', 89'; Kopa 27' (pen.); Douis 50'		Cieslarczyk 18'; Rahn 52'; Schäfer 84'

Ullevi, Gothenburg
Attendance: 32,483
Referee: Juan Regis Brozzi (Argentina)

=== 1982 FIFA World Cup ===
8 July 1982
21:00 CEST

West Germany	3–3 (a.e.t.)	France
Littbarski 17'; Rummenigge 102'; Fischer 108'	Report	Platini 26' (pen.); Trésor 92'; Giresse 98'
Penalties
Kaltz (penalty scored); Breitner (penalty scored); Stielike (penalty missed); Littbarski (penalty scored); Rummenigge (penalty scored); Hrubesch (penalty scored)	5–4	(penalty scored) Giresse; (penalty scored) Amoros; (penalty scored) Rocheteau; (penalty missed) Six; (penalty scored) Platini; (penalty missed) Bossis

Ramón Sánchez Pizjuán Stadium, Seville
Attendance: 70,000
Referee: Charles Corver (Netherlands)

=== 1986 FIFA World Cup ===
25 June 1986
12:00 CST

France	0–2	West Germany
	Report	Brehme 9'; Völler 89'

Estadio Jalisco, Guadalajara
Attendance: 45,000
Referee: Luigi Agnolin (Italy)

=== 2014 FIFA World Cup ===
4 July 2014
13:00 BRT (UTC−3)

France	0–1	Germany
		Hummels 13'

Estádio do Maracanã, Rio de Janeiro
Attendance: 74,240
Referee: Néstor Pitana (Argentina)

=== UEFA Euro 2016 ===
7 July 2016
21:00

Germany	0–2	France
	Report	Griezmann 45+2' (pen.), 72'

Stade Vélodrome, Marseille
Attendance: 64,078
Referee: Nicola Rizzoli (Italy)

=== 2018–19 UEFA Nations League ===
6 September 2018
20:45

Germany	0–0	France
	Report

Allianz Arena, Munich
Attendance: 67,485
Referee: Daniele Orsato (Italy)

16 October 2018
20:45

France	2–1	Germany
Griezmann 62', 80' (pen.)	Report	Kroos 14' (pen.)

Stade de France, Saint-Denis
Attendance: 77,300
Referee: Milorad Mažić (Serbia)

=== UEFA Euro 2020 ===
15 June 2021
21:00

France	1–0	Germany
Hummels 20' (o.g.)	Report

Allianz Arena, Munich
Attendance: 13,000
Referee: Carlos del Cerro Grande (Spain)

=== 2025 UEFA Nations League Finals ===
8 June 2025
15:00

Germany	0–2	France
	Report	Mbappé 45'; Olise 84'

MHPArena, Stuttgart
Attendance: 51,313
Referee: Ivan Kružliak (Slovakia)

== Matches ==
Number	Date	Location	Competition	Game	Results
1	15 March 1931	(France) Paris	Friendly	France – Weimar Republic	1–0
2	19 March 1933	(Weimar Republic) Berlin	Friendly	Weimar Republic – France	3–3
3	17 March 1935	(France) Paris	Friendly	France – Germany	1–3
4	21 March 1937	(Nazi Germany) Stuttgart	Friendly	Germany – France	4–0
5	5 October 1952	(France) Paris	Friendly	France – West Germany	3–1
6	16 October 1954	(West Germany) Hannover	Friendly	West Germany – France	1–3
7	28 June 1958	(Sweden) Gothenburg	1958 FIFA World Cup	France – West Germany	6–3
8	26 October 1958	(France) Paris	Friendly	France – West Germany	2–2
9	24 October 1962	(West Germany) Stuttgart	Friendly	West Germany – France	2–2
10	27 September 1967	(West Germany) Berlin	Friendly	West Germany – France	5–1
11	25 September 1968	(France) Marseille	Friendly	France – West Germany	1–1
12	13 October 1973	(West Germany) Gelsenkirchen	Friendly	West Germany – France	2–1
13	23 February 1977	(France) Paris	Friendly	France – West Germany	1–0
14	19 November 1980	(West Germany) Hannover	Friendly	West Germany – France	4–1
15	8 July 1982	(Spain) Seville	1982 FIFA World Cup	West Germany – France	3–3 (5–4 p)
16	18 April 1984	(France) Strasbourg	Friendly	France – West Germany	1–0
17	25 June 1986	(Mexico) Guadalajara	1986 FIFA World Cup	France – West Germany	0–2
18	12 August 1987	(West Germany) Berlin	Berlin Anniversary	West Germany – France	2–1
19	28 February 1990	(France) Montpellier	Friendly	France – West Germany	2–1
20	1 June 1996	(Germany) Stuttgart	Friendly	Germany – France	0–1
21	27 February 2001	(France) Paris	Friendly	France – Germany	1–0
22	15 November 2003	(Germany) Gelsenkirchen	Friendly	Germany – France	0–3
23	12 November 2005	(France) Paris	Friendly	France – Germany	0–0
24	29 February 2012	(Germany) Bremen	Friendly	Germany – France	1–2
25	6 February 2013	(France) Paris	Friendly	France – Germany	1–2
26	4 July 2014	(Brazil) Rio de Janeiro	2014 FIFA World Cup	France – Germany	0–1
27	13 November 2015	(France) Paris	Friendly	France – Germany	2–0
28	7 July 2016	(France) Marseille	UEFA Euro 2016	Germany – France	0–2
29	14 November 2017	(Germany) Cologne	Friendly	Germany – France	2–2
30	6 September 2018	(Germany) Munich	2018–19 UEFA Nations League	Germany – France	0–0
31	16 October 2018	(France) Paris	2018–19 UEFA Nations League	France – Germany	2–1
32	15 June 2021	(Germany) Munich	UEFA Euro 2020	France – Germany	1–0
33	12 September 2023	(Germany) Dortmund	Friendly	Germany – France	2–1
34	23 March 2024	(France) Lyon	Friendly	France – Germany	0–2
35	8 June 2025	(Germany) Stuttgart	2025 UEFA Nations League Finals	Germany – France	0–2

== Statistics ==
=== All-time top goalscorers ===
As of 8 June 2025

Nation	Player	Goals	Years
(France)	Antoine Griezmann	5	2014–2024
(France)	Just Fontaine	4	1958
(Germany)	Rudi Völler	3	1982–1994
(West Germany)	Gerd Müller	3	1966–1974

=== Overall record ===
As of 8 June 2025

Competition	Matches	Result			Goals	
Competition	Matches	France	Draws	Germany	France	Germany
FIFA World Cup	4	1	1*	2	9	9
UEFA European Championship	2	2	0	0	3	0
UEFA Nations League	3	2	1	0	4	1
All competitions	9	5	2	2	16	10
Friendly	26	11	6	9	37	40
All matches	35	16	8	11	53	50

Note 1: * Germany overcame France in 1982 FIFA World Cup semi-final match via penalty shoot-out.

=== Trophies ===
Competition	Titles	
Competition	Germany	France
FIFA World Cup	4	2
FIFA Confederations Cup	1	2
UEFA Euros	3	2
UEFA Nations League	0	1
Summer Olympics	1	1
All competitions	9	8

== See also ==
- France–Germany relations
