= Paul Stephenson (police officer) =

British police officer (born 1953)

Sir Paul Stephenson QPM
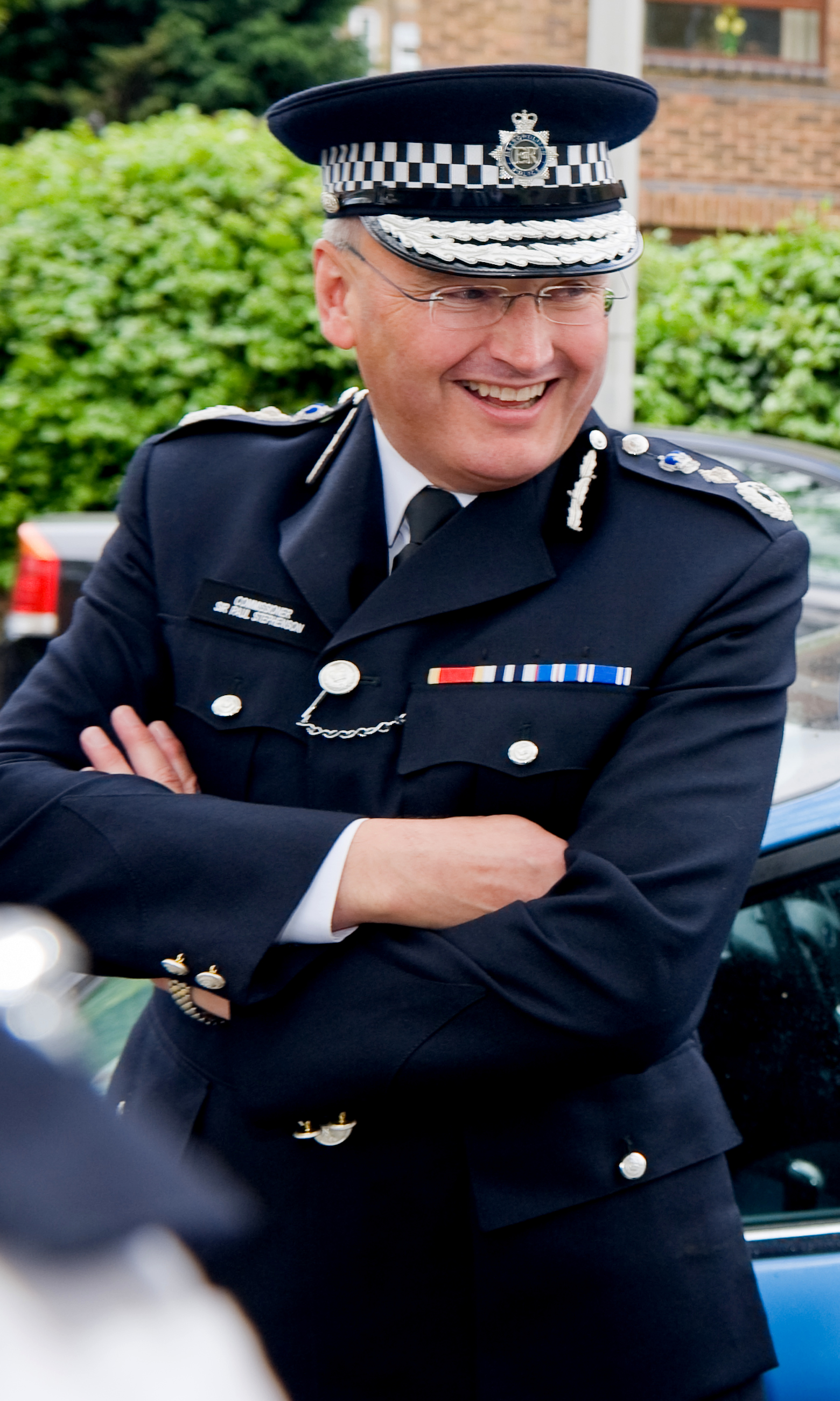
- Stephenson pictured in South London, May 2010

Commissioner of Police of the Metropolis
- In office 28 January 2009 – 18 July 2011
- Monarch: Elizabeth II
- Prime Minister: Gordon Brown; David Cameron
- Deputy: Tim Godwin
- Preceded by: Sir Ian Blair
- Succeeded by: Bernard Hogan-Howe

Deputy Commissioner of Police of the Metropolis
- In office 16 March 2005 – 28 January 2009
- Leader: Sir Ian Blair
- Preceded by: Sir Ian Blair
- Succeeded by: Tim Godwin

Personal details
- Born: Paul Robert Stephenson; 26 September 1953 (age 72) Bacup, Lancashire, England
- Profession: Police officer

Sir Paul Robert Stephenson QPM (born 26 September 1953) is a British retired police officer who served as Commissioner of Police of the Metropolis from 2009 to 2011.

Stephenson joined the Lancashire police in 1975 and attended the Bramshill staff training course. As a superintendent, he was closely involved in the inquiry into the 1989 Hillsborough stadium disaster. After serving as chief constable of Lancashire, he was promoted to deputy commissioner of the Metropolitan Police in 2005, acting commissioner in 2008, and finally commissioner in January 2009. In July 2011, Stephenson resigned over speculation regarding his connection with Neil Wallis, suspected of involvement in the News International phone hacking scandal.

== Biography ==
Stephenson grew up in Bacup in the Rossendale district of east Lancashire, the son of a butcher. He attended Fearns County Secondary School in Stacksteads where he excelled at swimming and went on to Bacup and Rawtenstall Grammar School to do his 'A' levels and became head boy.

Stephenson originally desired a career in the footwear industry, and took up work at the Bacup Shoe Company factory in nearby Stacksteads. By the age of 20 he was made a trainee manager, but in 1975 he followed his elder brother into the police force.

== Personal life ==
Stephenson lives in Lancashire with his wife, Lynda, and their three children.

== Career ==
Stephenson joined the police service in 1975, aged 21 and spent much of his early service as a constable attached to the Lancashire Underwater Search Unit. In 1982 Stephenson attended the Bramshill police training college near Hook in Hampshire as a sergeant on the Special Course at the same time as Sir Hugh Orde, Peter Clarke, Tim Brain, Paul Kernaghan, Frank Whitely, Jane Stitchbury and numerous other chief police officers. He became a sergeant in Bacup (1983), then an inspector in Burnley (1984) and a Chief Inspector in Colne Traffic Department (1986). He became a superintendent at the age of 34 in February 1988 when in Accrington as sub-divisional commander before being appointed to a Headquarters research and planning post where he also acted as staff officer to his then Chief Constable, Brian Johnson CBE, QPM, who was professional advisor to Sir Peter Taylor during the course of him undertaking the Hillsborough Inquiry (1989–1990). Stephenson was thus party to all the material submitted to and considered by the Taylor Inquiry, albeit in a relatively junior position.

He later took a six-month secondment to the (former) RUC in the early 1990s as a sub-divisional commander, a posting that ended in some acrimony. He returned to Lancashire to a further Headquarters support post before being appointed in 1994 as a sub-divisional commander to then divisional commander in Preston. He also served as Assistant Chief Constable in Merseyside Police between 1994 and 1999 and Deputy Chief Constable in Lancashire from May 1999 under Chief Constable Pauline Clare. Stephenson succeeded Pauline Clare and was appointed as Chief Constable of Lancashire Constabulary in July 2002. He was appointed deputy commissioner of the Metropolitan Police in February 2005.

In September 2008 it was announced he would become acting commissioner of the Met from 1 December, following the resignation of Sir Ian Blair. In January 2009 it was announced that he had been appointed as commissioner of the Metropolitan Police Service.

=== Resignation ===
In July 2011, Stephenson's judgement was questioned after it emerged that Neil Wallis, a former executive editor of the News of the World had acted as a media consultant to the MPS in 2009 and 2010, It also emerged that in early 2011 Stephenson received £12,000 of free hospitality from a Champneys health spa, where Wallis was working at the time whilst Stephenson was recovering from surgery for the removal of a non-malignant tumour in his femur. On 14 July 2011, Wallis was arrested by the Metropolitan Police investigating the News of the World phone hacking scandal.

On 17 July, in a lengthy statement in which he defended his actions, Stephenson announced his intention to resign as commissioner, saying that questions surrounding his integrity would otherwise become detrimental to the Met as a whole. The Deputy Commissioner, Tim Godwin, became Acting Commissioner in the interim between Sir Paul's resignation and the appointment of his successor, Bernard Hogan-Howe.

This is an excerpt from Stephenson's statement:

I have this afternoon informed the Palace, Home Secretary and the Mayor of my intention to resign as Commissioner of the Metropolitan Police Service. I have taken this decision as a consequence of the ongoing speculation and accusations relating to the Met's links with News International at a senior level and in particular in relation to Mr Neil Wallis who as you know was arrested in connection with Operation Weeting last week.

=== Honours ===

Ribbon	Description	Notes
	Knight Bachelor	2008
	Queen's Police Medal (QPM)	2000
	Queen Elizabeth II Golden Jubilee Medal	
	Police Long Service and Good Conduct Medal	

Stephenson was awarded the Queen's Police Medal for services to policing in the 2000 New Year Honours, followed in 2007 by an Honorary Fellowship from the University of Central Lancashire in Preston. He was knighted in the Queen's 2008 Birthday Honours.

== See also ==
- News International phone hacking scandal
- News media phone hacking scandal reference lists
- Metropolitan Police role in the news media phone hacking scandal

Police appointments
Preceded by Sir Ian Blair	Commissioner of Police of the Metropolis; 2009–2011; Acting: 2008–2009	Succeeded by Bernard Hogan-Howe
Preceded by Sir Ian Blair	Deputy Commissioner of Police of the Metropolis; 2005–2009	Succeeded by Tim Godwin
Preceded by ?	Chief Constable of Lancashire; 2002–2005	Succeeded by Steve Finnigan
