= Rose Fitzpatrick =

Retired British police officer

Rose Fitzpatrick CBE QPM

Deputy Chief Constable Territorial Policing, Police Scotland
- In office 2012–2018

Personal details
- Born: Rose Mary Fitzpatrick c. 1960 London, England

Rose Mary Fitzpatrick CBE QPM (born c. 1960) is a retired British police officer.

Fitzpatrick was born in London and began her career in the City. In 1987, at the age of 27, she joined the City of London Police as a constable and rose through the uniformed ranks to the rank of chief inspector. In 1993, she served as an exchange officer with Suffolk Constabulary, and in 1995 she was attached as a staff officer to HM Inspectorate of Constabulary.

In 1998, she transferred to the Metropolitan Police as a superintendent in charge of operational policing in Whitechapel, and the following year took responsibility for operational policing in the whole of Tower Hamlets. In February 2000, she was promoted to chief superintendent and took over as borough commander of Tower Hamlets. She was promoted to commander in November 2002 and headed a team working with the Home Office and Department for Constitutional Affairs to implement police and criminal justice reform, including the introduction of safer neighbourhood teams. She then took command of operational policing in North West London.

She was promoted to deputy assistant commissioner in August 2005 as head of the new Diversity and Citizen Focus Command. She served as DAC Territorial Policing and in 2009 was temporary Assistant Commissioner Territorial Policing. She then became DAC Corporate Development before retiring in 2012, but four weeks later joined the new Police Scotland in 2012 as deputy chief constable in charge of territorial policing.

Fitzpatrick was awarded the Queen's Police Medal (QPM) in the 2007 New Year Honours and appointed Commander of the Order of the British Empire (CBE) in the 2017 Birthday Honours for services to law and order.

She retired from Police Scotland in June 2018 and was appointed to chair the Scottish Government's new National Suicide Prevention Leadership Group. There was controversy when it emerged that the Scottish Police Authority had paid her a total of £67,000 in relocation expenses and footed a £53,000 tax bill during her service.

Fitzpatrick's husband is Scottish. They have two daughters.

== Footnotes ==
Police appointments
Preceded by Unknown	Borough Commander, Tower Hamlets, Metropolitan Police; 2000–2002	Succeeded by Unknown
Preceded by First incumbent	Deputy Assistant Commissioner Diversity and Citizen Focus, Metropolitan Police; 2005–?	Succeeded by Unknown
Preceded by Unknown	Deputy Assistant Commissioner Territorial Policing, Metropolitan Police ?–?	Succeeded by Unknown
Preceded by Tim Godwin	Assistant Commissioner Territorial Policing, Metropolitan Police; Temporary; 2009	Succeeded by Ian McPherson
Preceded by Unknown	Deputy Assistant Commissioner Corporate Development, Metropolitan Police ?–2012	Succeeded by Unknown
Preceded by First incumbent	Deputy Chief Constable Territorial Policing, Police Scotland; 2012–2018	Succeeded by Unknown
