= Penalty shoot-out (association football) =

Tie-breaking method in association football

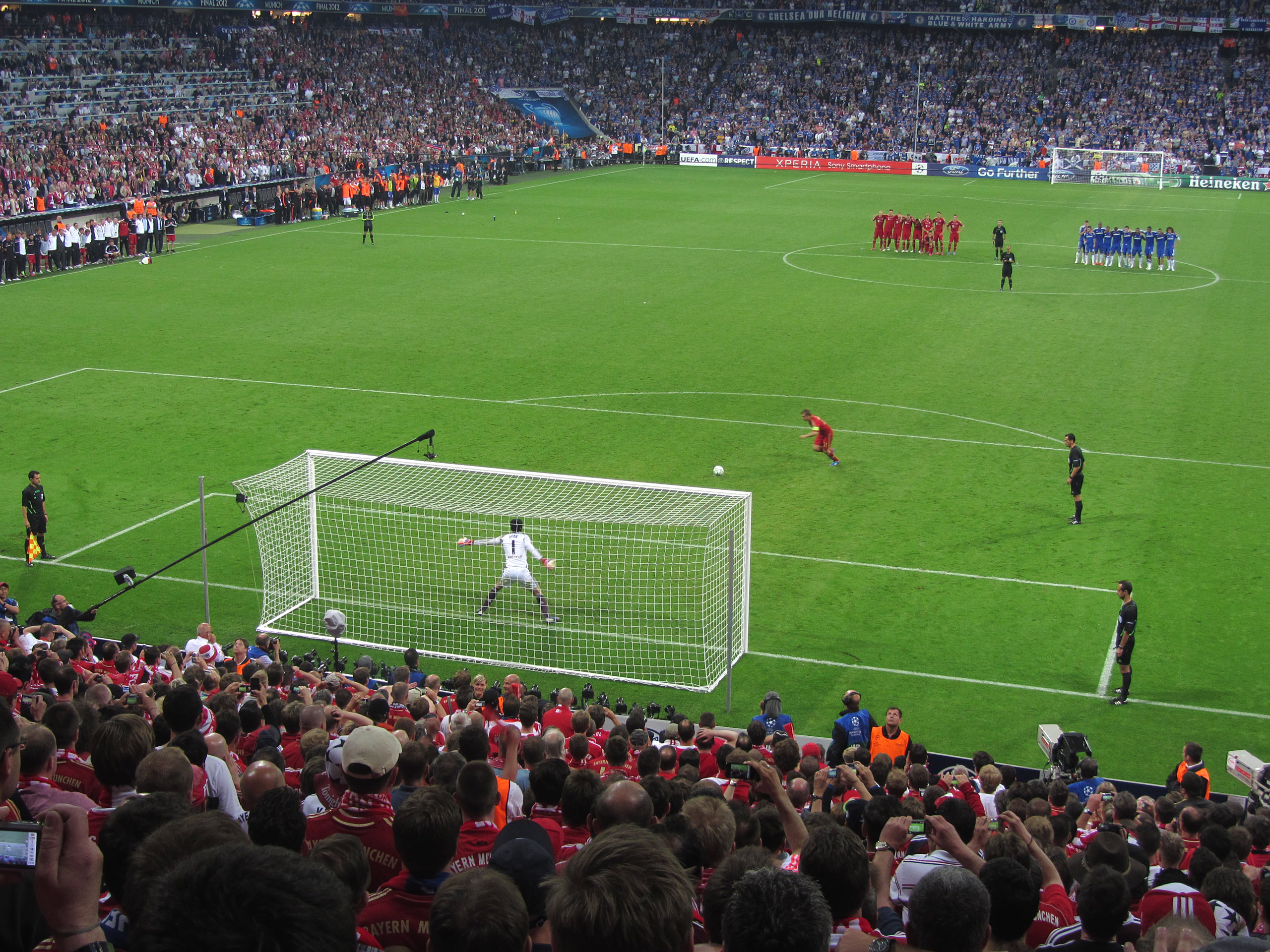
Philipp Lahm about to take a shot in the 2012 UEFA Champions League final penalty shoot-out

In association football, a penalty shoot-out (previously known as kicks from the penalty mark and colloquially known as penalties) is a tie-breaking method to determine which team is awarded victory in a match that cannot end in a draw, when the score is tied after the normal time as well as extra time (if used) has expired.

In a penalty shoot-out, each team takes turns shooting at goal from the penalty mark, with the goal defended only by the opposing team's goalkeeper. Each team has five shots which must be taken by different players; the team that makes more successful kicks is declared the victor. Shoot-outs finish as soon as one team has an insurmountable lead. If scores are level after five pairs of shots, the shootout progresses into additional "sudden-death" rounds.

Balls successfully kicked into the goal during a shoot-out do not count as goals for the individual kickers or the team, and are tallied separately from the goals scored during normal play (including extra time, if any). Although the procedure for each individual kick in the shoot-out resembles that of a penalty kick, there are some differences. Most notably, neither the kicker nor any player other than the goalkeeper may play the ball again once it has been kicked.

The penalty shoot-out is one of the three methods of breaking a draw that are approved by the Laws of the Game; the others are extra time and, for two-legged ties, the away goals rule. The method of breaking a draw for a specific match is determined beforehand by the match organising body.

A shoot-out is usually used only after one or more of the other methods fail to produce a winner. In many professional competitions, two 15-minute extra time periods are played if the score is tied at the end of regulation time, and a shoot-out is held if the score is still tied after the extra time periods. An example is the FIFA World Cup, where penalties are used only in elimination matches; the round of 32, the round of 16, the quarter-finals, the semi-finals, and the final.

Although widely employed in football since the 1970s, penalty shoot-outs have been criticised by many followers of the game, due primarily to their perceived reliance on luck rather than skill and their dependence on individual duels between opposing players, which is arguably not in keeping with football as a team sport. However, there is evidence that team strength predicts the winner in penalty shootouts and some believe the pressure and unpredictability involved makes it one of the most thrilling finales to any sport.

== Overview ==
During a shoot-out, players other than the kicker and the goalkeepers must remain in the centre circle. The kicking team's goalkeeper stands at the intersection of the goal line and the line marking the penalty area (16.5 m/18 yards) near one of the assistant referees. Goals scored during the shoot-out are not commonly added to the goalscoring records of the players involved.

A draw is a common result in football. Shoot-outs are only used in competitions that require a match-winner at the end of the game – this is predominantly in knockout "cup" ties, as opposed to round-robin "leagues"; they decide which team progresses to the next round of a tournament, or wins it. Usually extra time has been played first, but this is not necessary; exceptions include the Copa Libertadores, Copa América (quarter-finals, semi-finals, and third-place game), CONCACAF Gold Cup (quarter-finals and semi-finals), FA Community Shield, the EFL League Cup, and the Football League Trophy, all of which use shoot-outs straight after the end of normal time.

The rules of some competitions provide that a shoot-out may be used to decide placings in a round-robin group, in the unusual event that two teams who have faced each other in a final-day match finish the group with identical statistics, and no other team has the same record. This was invoked in Group A of the 2003 UEFA Women's Under-19 Championship, in which Italy and Sweden held a shootout immediately after their drawn match. This rule is a relatively recent innovation, and for example did not apply in Group F of the 1990 World Cup, where the Republic of Ireland and the Netherlands were separated by drawing of lots immediately after drawing their final-day match, however, at the 1994 UEFA European Under-16 Championship, the penalty shoot-out was used in the last Group A match between Belarus and Austria.

Several leagues, such as the J.League, have experimented with penalty shoot-outs immediately following a drawn league match, with the winner being awarded an extra point. In the United States and Canada, Major League Soccer initially also had a shoot-out immediately following the end of full-time, even during league matches, although these shoot-outs differed from standard penalty shoot-outs (see below). The final few seasons of the Yugoslav First League before the country's collapse eliminated draws in favour of penalty shoot-outs, with the winner getting one point and the loser getting nothing. This practice was controversial and unpopular and was derisively referred to as "Šajber's penalties" after Slavko Šajber, the president of the Yugoslav FA who pushed for the change.

The results of a penalty shootout are treated the same as if the winning team won in regulation time (the loser is eliminated from the tournament while the winner moves onto the next stage unless it’s the final, in which the winner is crowned champion while the loser finishes runners up) but the match is classed as a draw by FIFA. For instance, the Netherlands are considered to have concluded the 2014 FIFA World Cup undefeated, despite being eliminated at the semi-final stage.

== Procedure ==
The following is a summary of the procedure for kicks from the penalty mark. The procedure is specified in Law 10 ("Determining the Outcome of a Match") of the Laws of the Game.

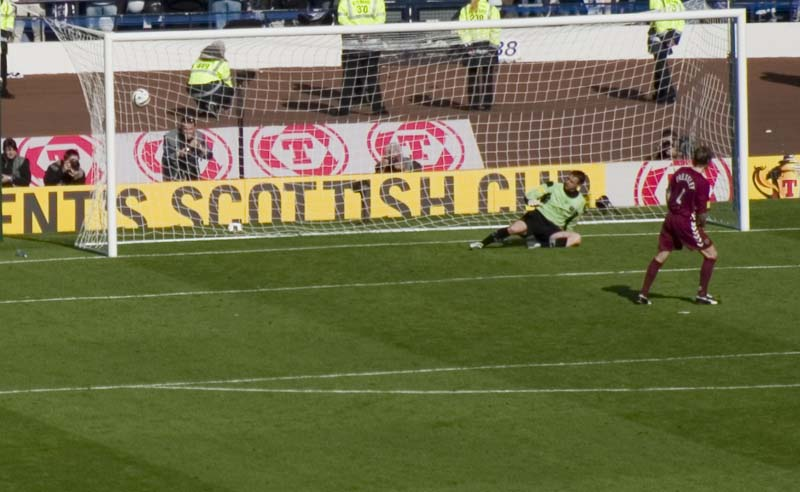
Steven Pressley scores for Hearts against Gretna in the 2006 Scottish Cup Final shoot-out

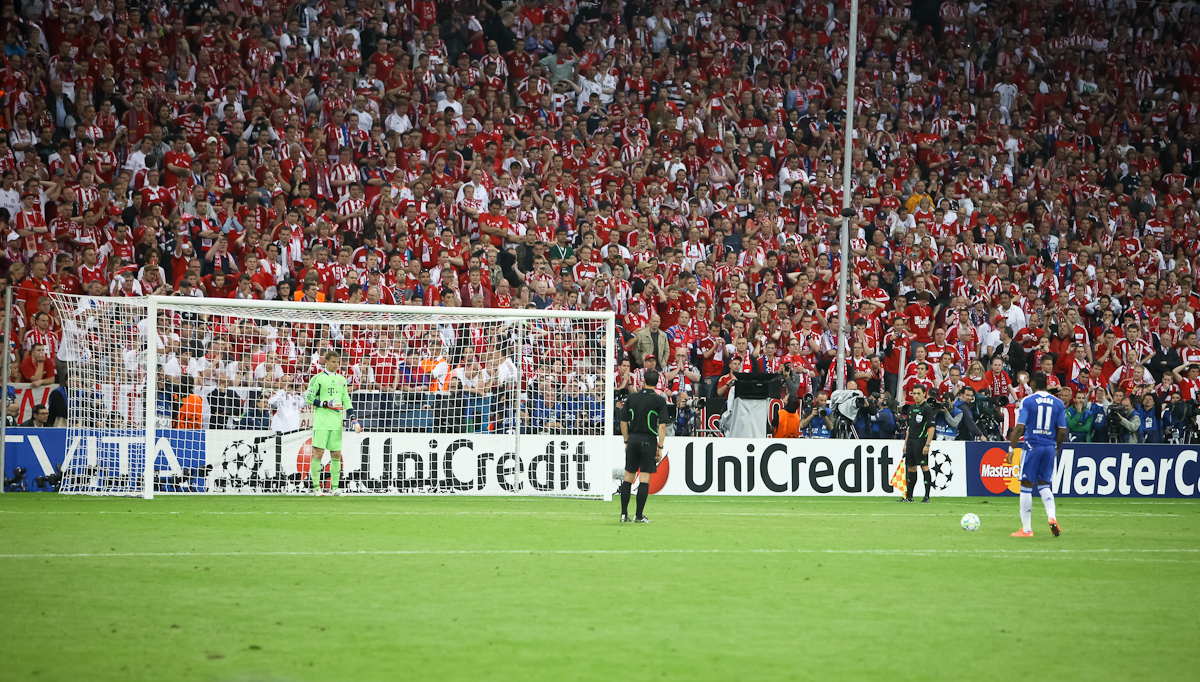
Deciding penalty kick of Didier Drogba in the 2012 UEFA Champions League Final

1. The referee tosses a coin to decide the goal at which the kicks are taken. The choice of goal may be changed by the referee for safety reasons or if the goal or playing surface becomes unusable.
2. The referee tosses the coin a second time to determine which team takes the first kick.
3. All players other than the kicker and the goalkeepers must remain in the pitch's centre circle (see above).
4. Each kick is taken in the general manner of a penalty kick. Each kick is taken from the penalty mark, which is 11 m (12 yards) from the goal line and equidistant from each touch line, with the goal defended only by the opposing goalkeeper. The goalkeeper must remain between the goal posts on their goal line until the ball has been kicked, although they can jump in place, wave their arms, move side to side along the goal line, or otherwise try to distract the shooter.
5. Each team is responsible for setting the order in which its eligible players take kicks.
6. Each kicker can kick the ball only once. Once kicked, the kicker may not play the ball again.
7. No other player on either team, other than the designated kicker and goalkeeper, may touch the ball.
8. A kick results in a goal scored for the kicking team if, having been touched once by the kicker, the ball crosses the goal line between the goal posts and under the crossbar, without touching any player, official, or outside agent other than the defending goalkeeper. The ball may touch the goalkeeper, goal posts, or crossbar any number of times before going into the goal as long as the referee believes the ball's motion is the result of the initial kick. This was clarified after an incident in the 1986 World Cup shoot-out between Brazil and France. Bruno Bellone's kick rebounded out off the post, hit goalkeeper Carlos's back, and subsequently bounced into the goal. Referee Ioan Igna gave the goal to France, and Brazil captain Edinho was booked for protesting that the kick should have been considered a miss as soon as it rebounded off the post. In 1987, the International Football Association Board clarified Law 14, covering penalty kicks, to support Igna's decision.
9. Teams take turns to kick from the penalty mark, until each has taken five kicks. However, if one side has scored more goals than the other could possibly reach with all of its remaining kicks, the shoot-out immediately ends, regardless of the number of kicks remaining; this basis is called "best-of-five kicks". In the 2006 World Cup final, for example, the shoot-out ended after Italy's Fabio Grosso had scored his team's fifth, despite the fact that France (on three) still had one more shot to take. Similarly, in the 2022 FIFA World Cup Final, Gonzalo Montiel's successful conversion of Argentina's fourth kick won the trophy, despite France and Argentina both having one kick left.
10. If after five rounds of kicks, the teams have scored an equal number of goals (or neither team has scored any goals), additional rounds of one kick each are used until one team scores and the other misses. This is known as sudden death.
11. The team that scores the most goals at the end of the shoot-out is the winner of the match.
12. Only players who were on the pitch at the end of play or temporarily absent (injured, adjusting equipment etc.) are allowed to participate in the shoot-out. If at the end of the match and before or during the kicks one side has more players on the pitch than the other, whether as a result of injury or red cards, then the side with more players must reduce its numbers to match the opponents; this is known as "reduce to equate". For example, if Team A has eleven players but Team B only has ten, then Team A chooses one player to exclude. Players excluded this way may take no further part in the procedure, either as kicker or goalkeeper, except that they can be used to replace a goalkeeper who becomes injured during the shootout. The rule was introduced by the International Football Association Board in February 2000 because previously an eleventh kick would be taken by the eleventh (i.e. weakest) player of a full-strength team and the first (i.e. strongest) player of a sub-strength team. A rule change in 2016 eliminated the possibility of a team gaining such an advantage if a player is injured or sent off during the shoot-out.
13. A team may replace a goalkeeper who becomes injured during the shoot-out with a substitute (provided the team has not already used the maximum number of substitutes allowed by the competition) or by a player previously excluded under the 'reduce to equate' provision.
14. If a goalkeeper is sent off during the shoot-out, another player who finished the game must act as goalkeeper.
15. If a player, other than the goalkeeper, becomes injured or is sent off during the shoot-out, then the shoot-out continues with no substitution allowed. The opposing team must reduce its numbers accordingly.
16. Any player remaining on the pitch may act as the goalkeeper, and it is not required for the same player to have acted as a goalkeeper during the game.
17. No player is allowed to take a second kick until all other eligible players on their team have taken a first kick, including the goalkeeper.
18. If it becomes necessary for players to take another kick (because the score has remained equal after all eligible players have taken their first kick), players are not required to kick in the same order.
19. Kicks from the penalty mark must not be delayed for a player who leaves the field of play. The player's kick is forfeited (not scored) if the player does not return in time to take a kick.
20. The referee must not abandon the match if, during the kicks, a team is reduced to fewer than seven players.

== Tactics ==
Defending against a penalty kick is one of the most difficult tasks a goalkeeper can face. Some decide which way they will dive beforehand, giving themselves time to reach the side of the goalmouth. A 2011 study published in the journal Psychological Science found goalkeepers dived to the right 71% of the time when their team was losing, but only 48% when ahead and 49% when tied, a phenomenon believed to be related to certain right-preferring behaviour in social mammals. Others try to read the kicker's motion pattern. Kickers may attempt to feint, or delay their shot to see which way the keeper dives. Shooting high and centre, in the space that the keeper will evacuate, carries the highest risk of shooting above the bar. If a keeper blocks a penalty kick during a match, there is a danger the kicker or a teammate may score from the rebound; this is not relevant in the case of a shoot-out.

Since the entire shoot-out is conducted at the same goal, the crowd behind the goal may favour one team and try to distract the other team's shooters. To forestall any potential advantage, in 2016 the Laws of the Game were modified to add a coin toss between the two teams prior to the shoot-out: the winner of the coin toss has the right to decide which goal is used for the shoot-out (previously, the decision was at the referee's discretion). The referee may change the goal only for safety reasons or if the selected goal or pitch are unusable.

A goalkeeper may not use distracting gamesmanship such as cleaning their boots or asking the referee to see if the ball is placed properly; this risks a caution for unsporting conduct. Bruce Grobbelaar's "wobbly legs" clowning distracted Francesco Graziani in the 1984 European Cup Final shootout. The keeper is forbidden from moving off the goal line to narrow the shooter's angle; the 2003 UEFA Champions League Final shootout caused controversy as replays showed that both keepers got away with this, as did Jerzy Dudek in the 2005 Champions League Final.

Tactics used by goalkeepers to reduce the probability of kickers succeeding with their kicks include:

- Visually distracting the kicker (e.g., pointing, gesturing) – Research shows goalkeeper distraction behaviours are linked with 10% less goals for the penalty taker
- Verbally irritating, annoying or provoking the kicker
- Physically confronting the kicker
- Delaying the kicker (e.g., the goalkeeper taking a long time to position themself for the kick) – Research shows goalkeeper delaying behaviours are linked with 20% less goals for the penalty taker

== History ==
=== Origins ===
Between 1867 and 1970, the laws of association football did not provide for a method of breaking ties. The first association football tournament, the FA Cup, used extra time and replays to decide drawn games. This example was followed by other early knockout competitions. In the early 1920s, some charity matches began using corner-kicks as a tie-breaker in order to avoid replays. In response, the laws of the game were amended in 1923 to state explicitly that the goal was the only means of scoring, and that a match that ended with equal number of goals scored was drawn.

In major competitions, when a replay or playoff was not possible, ties were previously broken by drawing of lots. Examples include Italy's win over the USSR in the semi-final of the 1968 European Championship (the final, also drawn, went to a replay). However, variants of the modern shoot-out were used before then in several domestic competitions and minor tournaments. Domestic examples include the Yugoslav Cup from 1952, the Coppa Italia from 1958 to 1959, and the Swiss inter-regional Youth Cup from 1959 to 1960. International examples include the 1962 Uhrencup (at the suggestion of its founder Kurt Weissbrodt), the final of the 1962 Ramón de Carranza Trophy (at the suggestion of journalist Rafael Ballester), and a silver medal playoff match between amateur teams representing Venezuela and Bolivia in the 1965 Bolivarian Games. Pavllo Bukoviku took and scored all KS Besa's kicks in a 5–2 shootout win in the 1963 Albanian Cup Final, a format devised by Anton Mazreku, the Albanian FA president.

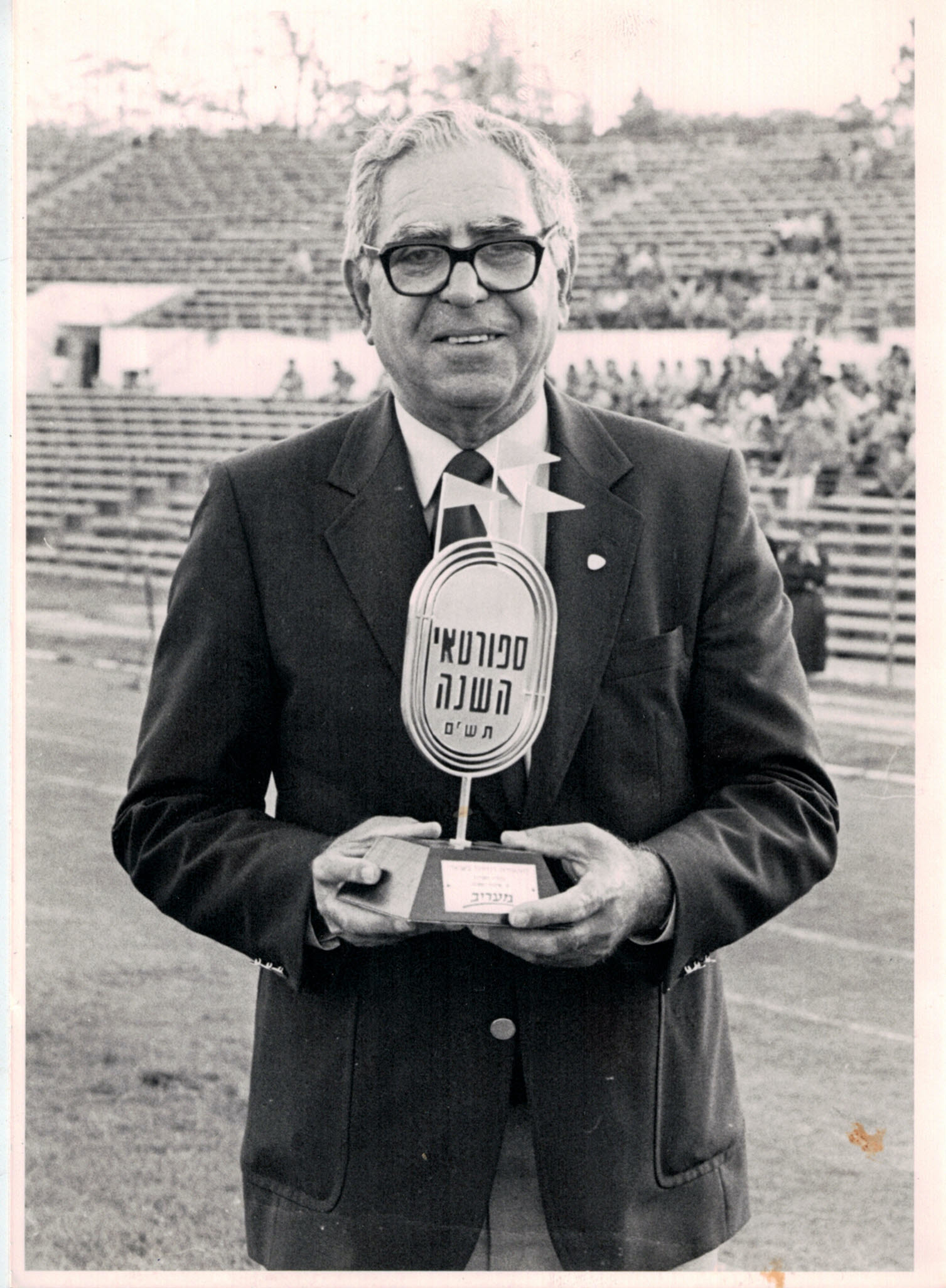
Michael Almog

The inventor of the modern shoot-out is uncertain; both Israeli Yosef Dagan and German referee Karl Wald are credited with originating the modern shoot-out in the 1960s.

Dagan was reportedly inspired by the Israeli team losing a 1968 Olympic quarter-final game against Bulgaria by drawing of lots in Mexico. Michael Almog, later president of the Israel Football Association, described Dagan's proposal in a letter published in FIFA News in August 1969. Koe Ewe Teik, the FA Malaysia's member of the referee's committee, led the move for its adoption by FIFA. FIFA's proposal was discussed on 20 February 1970 by a working party of the International Football Association Board (IFAB), which recommended its acceptance, although "not entirely satisfied" with it. It was adopted at IFAB's annual general meeting on 27 June 1970.

In May 1970, the Bavarian FA added the shoot-out to its rulebook after it had been proposed by the German referee Karl Wald. Wald is reported to have used shoot-outs unofficially to decide matches since the early 1960s, and is also credited with inspiring the later rule changes of DFB, UEFA and FIFA.

The adoption of the penalty shoot-out by IFAB came too late for the 1970 World Cup, whose rules still prescribed drawing of lots for any knockout match other than the final which ended drawn after extra-time (FIFA refused to announce in advance what would happen if the final itself ended up drawn). The technical report for the 1970 tournament recommended that drawing of lots should be abandoned in future tournaments, noting that "this suggestion has, however, since been cut across by the decision of the International Board as to the taking of penalty kicks to resolve such a deadlock situation." In the event, drawing of lots was never required to decide the winner of a knockout match in any World Cup finals, although it was used in a 1969 qualification tie when Morocco advanced at the expense of Tunisia.

A prototype of the penalty shoot-out was implemented in an Indonesian football competition during the West Java district final of the 1934–35 Championship between PPVIM Meester Cornelis and PSIT Cirebon. The match took place on 17 March 1935 at the Kebonpala Ground in Batavia. According to a report by the newspaper Sipatahoenan on 19 March 1935, after the match ended in a 0–0 draw following extra time, the match committee decided to determine the winner via a penalty shoot-out, granting three kicks to each team. During the shoot-out, the PPVIM Meester Cornelis goalkeeper successfully saved all three attempts from the PSIT Cirebon players, whereas the PSIT Cirebon goalkeeper managed to save only two. As a result, PPVIM Meester Cornelis were declared the winners with a 1–0 scoreline.

=== Development ===
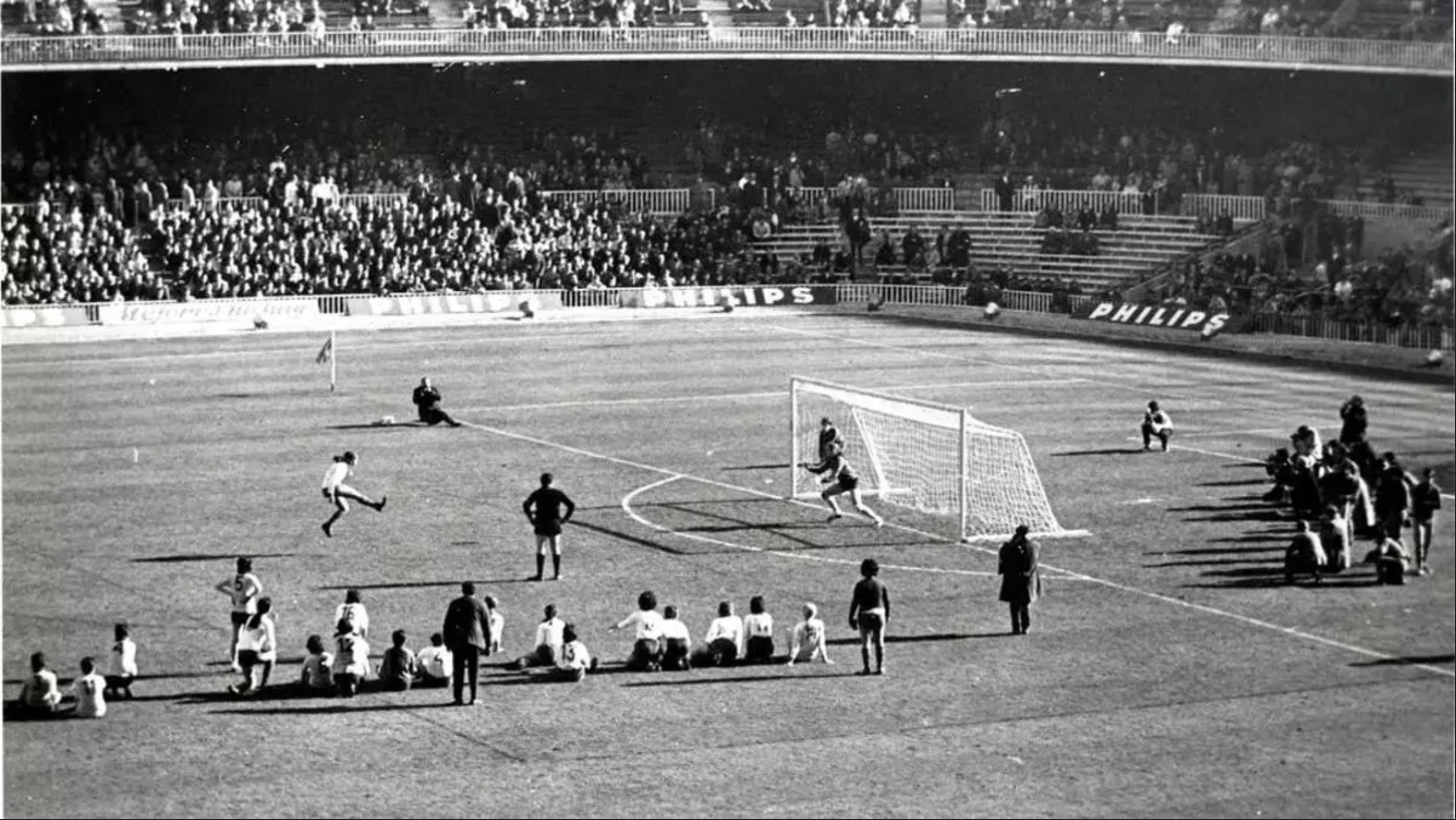
Barcelona women converting a kick during the penalty shoot-out on 25 December 1970

In England, the first penalty shoot-out in a professional match took place on 5 August 1970 at Boothferry Park, Hull, between Hull City and Manchester United during the semi-final of the Watney Cup, and was won by Manchester United. The first player to take a kick was George Best, and the first to miss was Denis Law. Ian McKechnie, who saved Law's kick, was also the first goalkeeper to take a kick; his shot hit the crossbar and deflected over, putting Hull City out of the Cup.

Penalty shoot-outs were used to decide matches in UEFA's European Cup and Cup Winners' Cup in the 1970–71 season. On 30 September 1970, after a 4–4 aggregate draw in the first round of the Cup Winners' Cup, Honvéd won the first shoot-out 5–4 against Aberdeen, when Jim Forrest's shot hit the bar. Five weeks later, on 4 November 1970, the first ever European Cup shoot out took place between Everton F.C. and Borussia Mönchengladbach, with the side from England this time being the winners 4–3.

A friendly cup game between the Barcelona women's team and UE Centelles went to penalty shoot-out in December 1970. The format of this shoot-out had penalty kicks taken in sets of three, with Barcelona kicking three, then Centelles kicking three. After two rounds of this continued to produce matching results, the shoot-out was taken to sudden death.

In the first round of the European Cup 1972–73, the referee prematurely ended a shoot-out between CSKA Sofia and Panathinaikos, with CSKA leading 3–2 but Panathinaikos having taken only four kicks. Panathinaikos complained to UEFA and the match was annulled and replayed the following month, with CSKA winning without the need for a shoot-out.

The final of the 1973 Campeonato Paulista ended in similar circumstances. Santos were leading Portuguesa 2–0 with each team having taken three shoot-out kicks, when referee Armando Marques mistakenly (as each team still had two shots to take, and therefore Portuguesa still had a chance of levelling the scoreline) declared Santos the winners. Portugues manager Otto Glória quickly led his team out of the stadium; this was allegedly to ensure the shoot-out could not resume once the mistake was discovered, and that instead the match would be replayed, giving Portuguesa a better chance of victory. When Santos counter-objected to a replay, Paulista FA president Osvaldo Teixeira Duarte annulled the original match and declared both teams joint champions.

The first major international tournament to be decided by a penalty shoot-out was the 1976 European Championship final between Czechoslovakia and West Germany. UEFA had made provision for a final replay two days later, but the teams decided to use a shoot-out instead. Czechoslovakia won the shootout 5–3, with the deciding kick being converted by Antonín Panenka with a "chip" after Uli Hoeneß had put the previous kick over the crossbar.

The first penalty shoot-out in the World Cup was on 9 January 1977, in the first round of African qualifying, when Tunisia beat Morocco. The first shoot-out in the finals tournament was on 8 July 1982, when West Germany beat France in the FIFA World Cup semifinal. If the 1982 final had been drawn, penalties would not have applied unless the replay was also drawn; from 1986, penalties were scheduled after the final as for the earlier knockout rounds.

== Famous incidents ==
=== Internationals ===
The finals of nine FIFA 11-a-side tournaments, including three men's World Cups, have gone to penalty shoot-outs. Some of the notable matches are as follows.

- The 1991 FIFA World Youth Championship final between Portugal and Brazil in Lisbon was decided on a penalty shoot-out which the Portuguese won 4–2, with the last shot coming from Rui Costa.
- In the 1994 FIFA World Cup final at the Rose Bowl in Pasadena, California, the match between Brazil and Italy ended goalless after extra time. Brazil went on to win the shoot-out 3–2.
- In the 1999 FIFA Women's World Cup Final, also held at the Rose Bowl, the match between hosts the United States and China ended goalless after extra time as well. The United States went on to win the shoot-out 5–4, becoming the first host country to win the tournament.
- The 2006 FIFA World Cup final between France and Italy also went to a penalty shoot-out (after a 1–1 draw followed by a scoreless 30 minutes of extra time) and was won by Italy 5–3 against France in Berlin's Olympic Stadium, winning their fourth world title.
- In the 2011 FIFA Women's World Cup final, held at Waldstadion in Frankfurt, the match between the United States and Japan ended 2–2 after extra time. This time, the United States ended up on the losing side. Japan won the shoot-out 3–1, thus becoming the first Asian country to win the senior—either men's or women's—World Cup.
- The 2013 FIFA U-20 World Cup final in Istanbul went to a penalty shoot-out after a 0–0 draw after extra time. France won 4–1 over Uruguay. It was their first U-20 World Cup title, thus became the first nation to win all five FIFA 11-a-side men's titles (FIFA World Cup, FIFA Confederations Cup, FIFA U-20 World Cup, FIFA U-17 World Cup, and the Olympic football tournament).
- The 2022 FIFA World Cup final between France and Argentina went to penalty shoot-out after the extra time ended with a 3–3 draw. Argentina won 4–2 against France in shoot-out to lift the World Cup trophy for the first time since 1986.

The first penalty shoot-out in a World Cup match was in the dramatic West Germany vs France semi-final match in 1982. After the penalty shoot-out ended equal, it went into sudden death.

Goalkeepers have been known to win shoot-outs by their kicking. For example, in a UEFA Euro 2004 quarter-final match, Portugal goalkeeper Ricardo saved a kick (without gloves) from England's Darius Vassell and then scored the winning shot. Another example is Vélez Sársfield's José Luis Chilavert in the 1994 Copa Libertadores Finals. (Chilavert had a reputation as a dead-ball specialist and scored 41 goals during his club career.). More recently, in the 2023 African Cup of Nations, DR Congo's Lionel Mpasi shot the ball into the top right-hand corner against Mohamed Gabaski, who had been a penalty-saving specialist in Egypt's run to the final in Cameroon two years prior.

Antonín Panenka (Czechoslovakia) decided the penalty shoot-out at the UEFA Euro 1976 Final against West Germany with a famous chip to the middle of the goal.

The England national team has lost seven (out of ten) penalty shoot-outs in major tournament finals, including losses to Germany in the semi-finals of the 1990 FIFA World Cup and UEFA Euro 1996 (the latter following a win over Spain by the same method in the previous round). After Euro 1996, England lost four more shoot-outs in a row in major tournament finals, losing to Argentina at the 1998 World Cup, Portugal at Euro 2004 and the 2006 World Cup and Italy at Euro 2012, before finally breaking their losing streak at the 2018 World Cup against Colombia; this shoot-out also allowed England to progress into the quarter-finals for the first time in twelve years. England again lost a penalty shoot-out to Italy in the UEFA Euro 2020 Final. They won their following penalty shootout against Switzerland in the UEFA Euro 2024 Quarter Finals.

The Netherlands, meanwhile, lost four consecutive shoot-outs: against Denmark in Euro 1992, France in Euro 1996, Brazil in the 1998 World Cup, and Italy in Euro 2000, before finally winning one against Sweden in Euro 2004. In Euro 2000, the Netherlands had two penalty kicks during the match and four attempts in the shoot-out but only managed to convert one kick against Italian keeper Francesco Toldo. Frank de Boer had both a penalty kick and shoot-out kick saved by Toldo, who also saved from Paul Bosvelt to give Italy a 3–1 shoot-out victory. The Netherlands' fortunes seemed to improve during the 2014 World Cup, when they defeated Costa Rica on penalty kicks in their quarter-final match, only to lose their semi-final match against Argentina on penalties. The 2022 World Cup saw their losing a shoot-out against Argentina once again, but this time in the quarter-finals.

The Italians have lost six shoot-outs in major championships, including three consecutive World Cups (1990–1998, including the 1994 final), the Euro 2008 quarter-finals, and the Euro 2016 quarter-finals. However, they have also won five shoot-outs, including the Euro 2000 semi-final against the Netherlands, the Euro 2012 quarter-final against England, the 2006 World Cup final against France, the Euro 2020 semi-final against Spain, and the Euro 2020 final against England.

On 16 November 2005, a place in the World Cup was directly determined by a penalty shoot-out for the first time. The 2006 FIFA World Cup qualifying playoff between Australia and Uruguay ended 1–1 on aggregate; Uruguay won the first leg 1–0 at home, and Australia won the second leg at home by the same score. A scoreless 30 minutes of extra time were followed by a shoot-out, which Australia won 4–2. This occurred again twice in qualifying matches for the 2022 FIFA World Cup, first on 29 March 2022 in the CAF third round between Egypt and Senegal, which Senegal won 3–1 on penalties after the two legs ended 1–1 on aggregate, and on 13 June 2022 in the AFC-CONMEBOL qualifying playoff between Australia and Peru, which Australia won 5–4 on penalties after the only fixture in the playoff went to a 0–0 draw. Delays due to the COVID-19 pandemic caused only one match to be played in neutral Qatar, rather than the traditional home-and-away playoff fixture.

During the 2006 FIFA World Cup in Germany, Switzerland set an unwanted new record in the round of 16 shoot-out against Ukraine by failing to convert any of their penalties, losing 3–0. The goalkeeper Oleksandr Shovkovskyi (Ukraine) became the first not to concede a single goal in the penalty shoot-out, saving two of the Swiss attempts, with another shot hitting the crossbar. The result meant that Switzerland became the first nation to be eliminated from the World Cup without conceding any goals (and, moreover, the only nation to participate in a World Cup finals tournament without conceding a goal). Despite this loss, Switzerland beat France 5–4 on penalties in the Euro 2020 round of 16.

The same competition featured a shoot-out between Germany and Argentina, the two most successful teams up to that point in terms of World Cup finals penalty shoot-outs: Each team had competed in three shoot-outs and won all of them. Germany won the shoot-out, leaving Germany alone with a 4–0 record in World Cup finals.

On 20 June 2007, a new UEFA record was established. The semi-final of the European Under-21 Championships in Heerenveen between the Netherlands and England team finished 1–1, and thirty-two penalties were taken before the tie was broken. The Netherlands eventually won the shoot-out 13–12.

=== Domestic cups ===
In the FA Cup, penalty kicks were used in the 1972 edition of the short-lived third-place playoff. They were introduced more generally in the 1991–92 season to decide matches still level after one replay and extra time. Previously there was no limit on the number of replays, which led to fixture disruption, especially disliked by the top clubs. Replays were often two or three days after the drawn match, which conflicted with the increased planning required after the Football Spectators Act 1989. The first team eliminated from the FA Cup on penalties was Scunthorpe United, beaten on 26 October 1991 by Rotherham United after a first-round replay. A shoot-out was first used in the FA Cup Final in 2005, when Arsenal beat Manchester United 5–4. The following year, Liverpool beat West Ham United in the FA Cup Final's second ever penalty shoot-out.

On 31 August 2005, a new English record was established when a shoot-out between Tunbridge Wells and Littlehampton Town in an FA Cup replay involved 40 kicks being taken, with Tunbridge Wells winning 16–15.

Shoot-outs have been used to settle six Football League Cup finals to date. The first was in 2001 when Liverpool beat Birmingham City 5–4 on penalties after a 1–1 draw after extra time in the match. The second was the 2009 final between Manchester United and Tottenham Hotspur ended goalless and was won 4–1 on penalties by Manchester United. Then the 2012 final between Liverpool and Cardiff City finished 2–2 after extra time, Liverpool winning 3–2 on penalties. The 2016 final was won by Manchester City beating Liverpool 3–1 on penalties, after a 1–1 draw. Manchester City also won the 2019 final 4–3 on penalties after a 0–0 draw with Chelsea. Chelsea then went on to lose the 2022 final 11–10 on penalties to Liverpool.

Penalty shoot-outs have been used for many years to settle drawn games in the earlier rounds of the Football League Cup, the earliest example being August 1976 when Doncaster Rovers beat Lincoln City 3–2 on penalties after three drawn games in a row (1–1, 1–1, 2–2) in a first round match. Shoot-outs tend to be quite rare in the semi-finals due to the away goals rule applying after extra time. However, a shoot-out was used in the 2013–14 semi-final between Sunderland and Manchester United after both teams finished level over two legs; Sunderland won the shoot-out 2–1.

The Community Shield is also settled using penalties, following the normal 90 minutes of play, but no extra time. Manchester United have won the shield three times via a shoot-out, beating Arsenal in 2003, Chelsea in 2007, and Portsmouth in 2008. Manchester United lost the 2009 match on penalties to Chelsea.

In 2008, the Turkish Cup Final featured two clubs outside of Istanbul's Top Three for the first time in two decades, but penalty kicks decided the winner between Gençlerbirliği and Kayserispor, the latter having reached the final for the first time ever. After a scoreless 120 minutes, 28 penalty kicks were needed to decide the outcome, and Kayserispor, thanks to the goal scoring and goal saving heroics of Dimitar Ivankov, won its first Turkish Cup 11–10.

In the 2008–09 Greek Cup final AEK took a 3–2 lead at 89' with a goal by Scocco; however Olympiacos came back from the dead at the dying seconds of stoppage time (90'+6) with a goal by Derbyshire, to force an overtime. While Olympiacos took a 4–3 lead in overtime with a goal by Galletti, the scorer was sent off with a second yellow card for taking his shirt off while celebrating. Later on, Avraam Papadopoulos also got a second yellow leaving Olympiacos with 9 players. AEK managed to tie the game at 4–4 forcing a penalty shoot out.

AEK was shooting first. Both AEK and Olympiacos scored in the first 4 penalties. Majstorovic of AEK hit the horizontal crossbar in the 5th penalty giving the chance to Djordjevic (for whom it was the closing game of his career) to seal the victory for Olympiacos. However, his shot was blocked by AEK's Argentinian goalkeeper Saja. Hence, the shooting continued. Both teams scored their 6th and 7th penalties. Center-back Antzas was slotted to hit the 8th penalty for Olympiacos, but keeper Nikopolidis took the initiative and took the penalty instead tying the score to 7–7. Nikopolidis blocked the subsequent (9th) penalty by Georgeas for AEK but Antzas missed the penalty for Olympiacos (saved by Saha) and failed to finish the shoot-out.

2026 Russian Cup final determined by a penalty shootout

Since Olympiacos had only 9 players in the field, the shooters had to rotate, going back to those that shoot the very first penalties. All 7 subsequent penalty takers for both teams scored, leading to a penalty shoot out that was at 14–14 with 32 penalty shots having been taken. However, Pelletieri of AEK had a bad penalty shot that was easily deflected by Nikopolidis, who then took the 34th penalty shot against the other goalkeeper, Saja, scoring, and ending this saga with a 15–14 win for Olympiacos in penalty shoot out and an overall score of 19–18. (2008–09 Greek Cup).

=== UEFA club competitions ===
The first penalty shoot-out in a European Cup final occurred in the 1984 European Cup Final as Liverpool defeated Roma. The match is best known for the antics of Liverpool keeper Bruce Grobbelaar. As Roma's Bruno Conti prepared to take his kick, Grobbelaar walked towards the goal smiling confidently at the cameras lined-up behind, then proceeded to bite the back of the net, in imitation of eating spaghetti. Conti sent his spot kick over the bar. Grobbelaar then produced a similar performance before Francesco Graziani took his kick, famously wobbling his legs in mock terror. Graziani duly missed and Liverpool went on to win the shootout 4–2.

In the 1986 European Cup Final between Steaua București and Barcelona, Steaua keeper Helmut Duckadam saved all four of Barca's penalties, for which he was dubbed "the hero of Seville". Steaua also missed two, but still prevailed 2–0 in the shoot-out to become the only Romanian club side to win the title.

In the 2003 UEFA Champions League Final the penalty-shoot out has caused controversy among many fans as replays showed that Milan goalkeeper Dida was off his goal line when saving penalties from Trezeguet, Zalayeta and Montero. Juventus keeper Buffon was also off his goal line when saving penalties from Seedorf and Kaladze.

In the 2005 UEFA Champions League Final between Milan and Liverpool, Liverpool keeper Jerzy Dudek used tactics similar to Bruce Grobbelaar in 1984 (known as the "Dudek dance" in 2005) to distract the Milan shootout takers which resulted in a victory for his team.

The 2008 UEFA Champions League Final between Manchester United and Chelsea went to penalties, when John Terry missed a penalty which would have won Chelsea the match (and the Champions League). His standing leg slipped as he took his kick, and the ball hit the post. Chelsea lost the shoot-out 6–5, to which Terry reacted by breaking down in tears. Terry was not originally the penalty taker, however, striker Didier Drogba had been sent off shortly before extra time ended.

In the semi-finals of the UEFA Champions League between Real Madrid and Bayern Munich, Iker Casillas and Manuel Neuer each saved two spot kicks. Neuer kept out penalties from Cristiano Ronaldo (£80 million) and Kaká (£56 million), then the most expensive footballers in history from their transfer fees.

On 19 May 2012, Chelsea defeated Bayern Munich 4–3 on penalties in the 2012 UEFA Champions League Final. Chelsea had never previously won a shoot-out in the competition, and had lost the 2008 final and 2007 semi-final on penalties. Bayern had never lost a shoot-out in Europe; their wins included the 2001 final against Valencia and the 2012 semi-final against Real Madrid. Didier Drogba dispatched the winning penalty, having been unable to take the fifth kick (missed by Terry) in the 2008 final due to a red card in extra time. The following day, many British newspapers made reference to the fact that an English team had finally beaten a German team on penalties.

On 26 May 2021, Villarreal defeated Manchester United 11–10 on penalties in the 2021 UEFA Europa League Final, after the game ended 1–1 after extra time. Every player on the pitch took penalties – Manchester United goalkeeper David De Gea was the only one to miss, with his shot being saved by Gerónimo Rulli to hand Villarreal its first major title. The 21 penalties converted was a record for a shoot-out in a major UEFA tournament match.

=== Records ===
The world record for the longest penalty shoot-out, and the highest score, in a first class match is 56 penalties during the 2023–24 Liga Alef (Israel's third tier) promotion play-offs when F.C. Dimona beat Shimshon Tel Aviv, 23–22.

The world record for the most penalties scored consecutively in a shoot out stands at 31, in a Vertu Trophy Round of 32 game between Blackpool and Aston Villa U21s on 17 December 2024, in which the 32nd penalty was saved, enabling Aston Villa to win, 18–17.

In major international tournaments, the most penalties came in the 2006 African Cup of Nations, where Ivory Coast and Cameroon needed 24 penalties to decide who would advance to the semi-finals. The Ivory Coast advanced by winning 12–11 after Samuel Eto'o missed his second attempt, as his was the only miss of the penalty shootout. Ivory Coast also participated in the longest shootout in a final, in the 1992 African Cup of Nations, where they beat Ghana, 11–10. This penalty shootout was significant in that it was the first in the final of a major international tournament that every player on the pitch took a penalty.

The longest FIFA World Cup penalty shoot-out, male or female, occurred in the 2023 FIFA Women's World Cup knockout stage match between Australia and France; the shoot-out saw 20 penalties taken, with Australia ultimately prevailing, 7–6.

On 11 December 2012, Bradford City set the record for most consecutive penalty shootout wins. They won 9 penalty shootouts since 2009 and that included wins against Arsenal and local rivals Huddersfield Town.

The shortest possible penalty shootout consists of three kicks by each team, with one team scoring all its kicks and the other team failing to score any. An example of this occurred in the semi-final of the 2017 FIFA Confederations Cup, with Chile beating Portugal 3–0, or the UEFA Euro 2024 where Portugal beat Slovenia with the same result in the shootout. In March 2026, Midtjylland lost to Nottingham Forest in the Europa League by missing all of their penalties, with Forest scoring all of theirs.

== Statistical record ==
A shoot-out is usually considered for statistical purposes to be separate from the match which preceded it. In the case of a two-legged fixture, the two matches are still considered either as two draws or as one win and one loss; in the case of a single match, it is still considered as a draw. This contrasts with a fixture won in extra time, where the score at the end of normal time is superseded. Converted shoot-out penalties are not considered as goals scored by a player for the purposes of their individual records, or for "golden boot" competitions.

The NCAA rules book, which governs most college soccer in the United States, takes a similar approach. With the exception of the national championship game, if the score of any game remains tied following the sudden death overtime (or golden goal), the game is recorded as a tie, regardless of the result of the shoot-out tiebreaker. In a national championship game, the result of the shoot-out tiebreaker also determines the result of the game for statistical purposes. Until 2001, all NCAA games in which the shoot-out tiebreaker was used to determine advancement or a champion were recorded as a tie. In 2002, the rule was modified such that all games in which the shoot-out tiebreaker was used would also decide the winner of the game for statistical purposes. The rule was again changed in 2003 to match the pre-2002 rule with the newly added exception that a shoot-out tiebreaker in a national championship game would be decisive for all purposes, including the record.

In the calculation of UEFA coefficients, shoot-outs are ignored for club coefficients, but not national team coefficients, where the shoot-out winner gets 20,000 points: more than the shoot-out loser, who gets 10,000 (the same as for a draw) but less than the 30,000 points for winning a match outright. In the FIFA World Rankings, the base value of a win is three points; a win on penalties is two; a draw and a loss on penalties are one; a loss is zero. The more complicated ranking system FIFA used from 1999 to 2006 gave a shoot-out winner the same points as for a normal win and a shoot-out loser the same points as for a draw; goals in the match proper, but not the shoot-out, were factored into the calculation.

== Criticisms ==
As a way to decide a football match, shoot-outs have been seen variously as a thrilling climax or as an unsatisfactory cop-out.

Paul Doyle describes shoot-outs as "exciting and suspense-filled" and the 2008 UEFA Champions League Final shoot-out as "the perfect way to end a wonderful ... final". Richard Williams compares the spectacle to "a public flogging in the market square".

The result is often seen as a lottery rather than a test of skill; managers Luiz Felipe Scolari and Roberto Donadoni described them as such after their teams had respectively won and lost shoot-outs. Others disagree. Mitch Phillips called it "the ultimate test of nerve and technique". Paul Doyle emphasised the psychological element.

Only a small subset of a footballer's skills is tested by a shoot-out. Ian Thomsen likened deciding the 1994 World Cup using a penalty shoot-out to deciding the Masters golf tournament via a minigolf game. The shoot-out is a test of individuals which may be considered inappropriate in a team sport; Sepp Blatter has said "Football is a team sport and penalties is not a team, it is the individual".

Inferior teams are tempted to play for a scoreless draw, calculating that a shoot-out offers their best hope of victory. Red Star Belgrade's performance beating Olympique Marseille in the 1991 European Cup Final is often condemned for having "played for penalties" from the kick-off; a tactic coach Ljupko Petrović freely admitted to. On the other hand, the increased opportunity for giant-killing may also be seen as an advantage, increasing the romance of a competition like the FA Cup. Some teams have regarded, or been accused of regarding, a loss on penalties as an honourable result or "no defeat at all".

The Economist reported on the advantage of the team kicking first usually winning and on the players aiming higher usually scoring a goal.

=== Advantage to team kicking first ===
Ignacio Palacios-Huerta has suggested that the alternating kick sequence gives an unfair advantage to the team kicking first, with statistical evidence showing that the team kicking first wins in 60% of the cases, probably because the team kicking second is under more pressure when trailing in the shoot-out. As a remedy, he proposed using the Thue–Morse sequence to determine the kicking order. Another, more comprehensive, analysis by InStat looked at over 2,000 penalty kick shootouts, where the first to go won 51.48% of the time. However, in the academic literature, empirical support for the existence of such a first-mover advantage is ambiguous. For instance, an extensive study conducted in 2024 found no first-mover advantage in modern European football.

As part of a trial to reduce a potential first-mover advantage, the IFAB sanctioned in March 2017 to test a different sequence of taking penalties, known as "ABBA", that mirrors the serving sequence in a tennis tiebreak (team A kicks first, team B kicks second):

Original sequence
AB AB AB AB AB (sudden death starts) AB AB AB etc.
Trial sequence
AB BA AB BA AB (sudden death starts) BA AB BA etc.

The trial was initially scheduled at the 2017 UEFA European Under-17 Championship and the 2017 UEFA Women's Under-17 Championship in May 2017 if a penalty shoot-out would be needed. The trial was extended in June 2017 to include the 2017 UEFA European Under-19 Championship and the 2017 UEFA Women's Under-19 Championship.

The penalty shoot-out in the Women's Under-17 Championship semi-final between Germany and Norway was the first ever to implement this new system. It was also used in the 2017 FA Community Shield on 6 August 2017.

During IFAB's 133rd Annual Business Meeting in Glasgow, Scotland on 22 November 2018, it was agreed that due to a lack of strong support, mainly because of its complexity, the ABBA option would no longer be used in future competitions.

== Alternatives ==
Other tie-break methods have been proposed, both before and since shoot-outs were introduced.

Association football used the "touch down" (similar to a try in rugby) between 1866 and 1867. The touch-down was related to similar tie-breakers used in non-association football codes, such as the "rouge" in the Eton field game (and, from 1862 to 1868, in Sheffield Rules). In rugby itself, the try served as a tie-breaker between 1875 and 1886.

A drawn result may be allowed to stand, unless the fixture determines which team qualifies for a later round. Before 1993 (except in 1974) the FA Charity Shield was shared if the match was drawn. When the third place playoff of the 1972 Olympic tournament between the Soviets and East Germany ended 2–2 after extra time, the bronze medal was shared by the two teams.

During the qualification process for the 1962 World Cup, Morocco and Tunisia formed a two-team group. They both won 2–1 at home, so they played the third match at a neutral location. When this ended in a 1–1 draw after extra time, Morocco advanced on a coin toss to the next round of qualification. This scenario was repeated during the qualification process for the 1970 World Cup, when the same two teams were tied after three matches and extra time. Again, Morocco advanced on a coin toss. Tunisia did have better luck with the coin toss in the intervening years; during the 1965 African Cup of Nations, they reached the final at the expense of Senegal by winning a coin toss after three group matches had left Tunisia and Senegal tied with a win (over Ethiopia) and a draw (against each other).

Alternatives include replaying a match that has ended in a draw. In the 1974 European Cup final, the final score of the first match was a draw, leading to a replay being played two days later. This remains the only time it has happened in the competition. Replays still occur up to, and including, the fifth round (last 16) of the English FA Cup. Until 1991, any number of replays were permitted, with a record of five between Alvechurch and Oxford City.(Since then, a draw in the [first] replay has been resolved by a penalty-shoot-out.) However, it was announced in April 2024 that replays would be scrapped from the first round onwards beginning with the 2024–2025 FA Cup season.

Other suggestions have included using elements of match play such as most shots on goal, most corner kicks awarded, fewest cautions and sendings-off, or having ongoing extra time with teams compelled to remove players at progressive intervals (similar to regular season play in the National Hockey League, where players play 3-on-3 in the extra time). These proposals have not yet been authorised by the International Football Association Board. However, after the 2006 World Cup, Sepp Blatter stated that he wants no more penalty shoot-outs in the Final of the World Cup, tentatively suggesting either a replay or "Maybe to take players away and play golden goal".

Henry Birtles' "Advantage" proposal is for the shoot-out to be held before extra-time, and only acting as a tiebreak if the game remains a draw after the full 120 minutes. Proponents of this idea state that it would lead to a more offensive extra-time as one of the teams would know they have to score and there would never be a match in which both teams are simply waiting for penalties. Another advantage is that players who have missed would have a chance to redeem themselves in extra-time. The obvious flaw is that the team that wins the penalty shoot-out would be inclined to play defensively in extra time in the knowledge that a draw would put them through.

Another alternative is Attacker Defender Goalkeeper (ADG), which features a series of ten contests, in which an attacker kicks off from 32 yards and has 15 seconds to score a goal against a defender and goalkeeper. At the completion of the ten contests, the team with the most goals is the winner.

== North American experiments ==
The North American Soccer League (NASL) in the 1970s and 1980s, then Major League Soccer (MLS) for its first four seasons (1996–1999) experimented with a variation of the shoot-out procedure.

Instead of a straight penalty kick, the shoot-out started 35 yards or 32 m from the goal and having five seconds to attempt a shot. The player could make as many moves as he could in a breakaway situation in the five seconds, then attempt a shot. This procedure is similar to that used in an ice hockey penalty shot. As with a standard shoot-out, this variation used a best-of-five-kicks model, and if the score was still level, the tiebreaker would head to an extra round of one attempt per team.

This format rewarded player skills, as players were able to attempt to deceive goalkeepers and play the ball in an attempt to make the shot, as in a one-on-one skills contest, and goalkeepers could take on the attackers without restrictions that are normally implemented in penalty shootouts. Soccer Bowl '81, the NASL's 1981 championship final, was decided by this format.

From its inception in 1968, the NASL used an unconventional point system in determining the league standings. Teams were awarded six points for a win and three points for a draw. In addition, teams earned one bonus point for each goal scored in a game up to a maximum of three per game. Thus, a team that lost 5–3 would earn three points. However, a team that lost 1–0 would earn no points. Also, a team that won 5–4 would earn nine points (the same as a 3–0 win). But a team that won 2–0 would earn only eight points. In the league's second season (1969), the Kansas City Spurs were the league champions with 10 wins, 2 losses and 4 ties even though the Atlanta Chiefs had 11 wins, 2 losses and 3 ties, because Kansas City earned more bonus points. Starting with 1971 postseason playoff matches, the NASL used a golden goal rule, and every match had a winner decided from the run of play. Extra-time sessions were 15 minutes long before a brief break and change of ends. Game 1 of the 1971 NASL semifinal series between the Rochester Lancers and the Dallas Tornado went six extra-time periods with Rochester scoring the game-winning goal in the 176th minute. Game 3 of that same series went four extra time periods with Dallas scoring in the 148th minute to win the match and the series. In 1975, the NASL adopted a conventional penalty-kick shootout system for all regular-season and postseason playoff matches, and there were no longer any NASL matches that ended in ties. In the standings, a team that won in regulation time was awarded six points. A team that won in a penalty-kick shootout was awarded one point. Bonus points continued to be awarded for each goal scored up to a maximum of three per game.

In 1977, the NASL adopted the experimental North American shootout procedure described above. If a match was tied after 90 minutes, a maximum of two golden goal extra time periods of 7.5 minutes each were played. If neither team scored, the shootout was held to determine the winner of the match. In the standings, a team that won was awarded six points whether the win came in regulation time, extra time or by shootout. Bonus points continued to be awarded for each goal scored up to a maximum of three per game. No bonus points were awarded for goals scored in extra time. Postseason playoff games were decided in the same manner. The first match to be decided by the new shootout was a scoreless draw between Team Hawaii and the Seattle Sounders on 8 April 1977; the home side Team Hawaii won 1–0 after four rounds with the lone conversion by Brian Tinnion. In 1981, the number of points awarded to a team that won a game in a shootout was reduced from six to four. This remained the system until the NASL's final season in 1984.

From its inception in 1996, MLS used the shootout system that had been used by the NASL to determine winners of matches. No regular-season or postseason playoff games ended in a tie. In general, no extra time was played; the shootout commenced immediately after 90 minutes had been played. The only exception was in the MLS Cup Final in which a match tied after 90 minutes would be followed by a maximum of two 15-minute extra time sessions on a golden goal basis. In the regular-season standings, a team that won a match in regulation was awarded three points. A team that won a match in a shootout was awarded one point. There were no bonus points or points awarded to teams that lost whether in regulation time or a shootout. In the playoffs, the conference semifinals and conference finals were organised as best-of-three matches series. A shootout win counted as a win. Thus, a team could win two of the three matches by shootout and lose the other match in regulation and still advance to the next round. This was inconsistent with how the teams were rewarded during the regular season when the team with one win would have earned three points, and the team with two wins would have earned only two points. In 1999, a maximum of two 15-minute golden goal extra time periods were added for matches that were tied after 90 minutes of regulation play. If neither team scored during extra time, the match was decided by a shootout. MLS abandoned the North American style shootout starting with the 2000 season. If penalties are required to determine a winner during the playoffs, MLS now uses the shoot-out procedure specified by the International Football Association Board.

In the MLS Next Pro development league, all draws are followed by a penalty shoot out. While both teams receive 1 match point for the draw, the team winning the penalty shootout gets an additional match point, resulting in draws giving 1 point to the loser of the shootout and 2 to the winner.

== See also ==
- List of FIFA World Cup penalty shoot-outs
- List of FIFA Women's World Cup penalty shoot-outs
- List of UEFA European Championship penalty shoot-outs
- List of Copa América penalty shoot-outs
- Penalty kick
- Golden goal

== Bibliography ==
- On Penalties by Andrew Anthony (ISBN 0-224-06116-X)
