= Golden Boot =

Golden Boot or Golden Shoe may refer to:

== Awards ==
=== Association football ===
- Golden Boot Award, FIFA competition award for top goalscorer of tournament
  - FIFA World Cup Golden Boot
  - FIFA U-20 World Cup Golden Boot
  - FIFA U-17 World Cup Golden Boot
  - FIFA Women's World Cup Golden Boot
  - FIFA U-20 Women's World Cup Golden Boot
  - FIFA U-17 Women's World Cup Golden Boot
  - FIFA Confederations Cup Golden Boot
  - FIFA Club World Cup Golden Shoe
- Belgian Golden Shoe, awarded to the best football player in Belgian Pro League, as voted by press and football personalities
- CSL Golden Boot, awarded to the top goalscorer in the Canadian Soccer League
- European Golden Shoe, awarded to the top goalscorer out of all European domestic leagues
- European Championship Golden Boot, awarded to the top goalscorer at the UEFA European Championships
- Lesley Manyathela Golden Boot, awarded to the top goalscorer in the Premier Division in South Africa.
- MLS Golden Boot, awarded to the top goalscorer in Major League Soccer in the U.S. and Canada
- NWSL Golden Boot, awarded to the top goalscorer in the National Women's Soccer League in the U.S.
- Premier League Golden Boot, awarded to the Premier League top goalscorer in England
- Women's Super League Golden Boot, awarded to the FA Women's Super League top goalscorer in England
- WPS Golden Boot, awarded to the top goalscorer in Women's Professional Soccer in the U.S.
- WNL Golden Boot, awarded to the top goalscorer in the Irish Women's National League
- Pakistan Premier League Golden Boot, presented to the top-scorer of the Pakistani Premier League

=== American football ===
- Golden Boot (LSU-Arkansas), American football award for the winner of game between Arkansas and LSU

=== Rugby League ===
- Rugby League World Golden Boot Award, an international rugby league award

=== Others ===
- Golden Boot Awards, awards in the genre of Western television and movies

== Other uses ==
- Golden boot compensation, an inducement for an employee to retire early
- The Golden Boot, shoe shop in Maidstone, Kent, United Kingdom
- The Golden Boots, a 15-minute special episode of the British animated series Peppa Pig
