= Tim Godwin =

British police officer

Tim Godwin OBE QPM

Deputy Commissioner of Police of the Metropolis
- In office 16 July 2009 – 8 November 2011
- Leader: Sir Paul Stephenson; Bernard Hogan-Howe
- Preceded by: Sir Paul Stephenson
- Succeeded by: Craig Mackey

Acting Commissioner of the Metropolitan Police
- In office 18 July 2011 – 12 September 2011
- Preceded by: Sir Paul Stephenson
- Succeeded by: Bernard Hogan-Howe (as Commissioner)
- In office December 2010 – January 2011
- Preceded by: Sir Paul Stephenson
- Succeeded by: Sir Paul Stephenson

Personal details
- Born: Haywards Heath, Sussex, United Kingdom
- Education: University of Portsmouth; Fitzwilliam College, Cambridge
- Website: Profile

Timothy John Godwin OBE QPM is a former British police officer, who served as Deputy Commissioner of London's Metropolitan Police Service, from July 2009 until November 2011. He held the post of Acting Commissioner, following the resignation of the Commissioner Sir Paul Stephenson in July 2011 and remained in post until his replacement, Bernard Hogan-Howe, was formally appointed on 12 September 2011.

Godwin had previously been Acting Deputy Commissioner from December 2008 following the promotion of the previous incumbent, Sir Paul Stephenson, to Commissioner; he was substantively appointed Deputy Commissioner in July 2009. He also briefly held the top job as Acting Commissioner in December 2010 when the then Commissioner, Sir Paul Stephenson, took a leave of absence to undergo surgery to remove a tumour.

On 8 November 2011, Godwin announced that after 30 years in the police service he was to retire and take a role in the private sector.

== Education and Merchant Navy career ==
Godwin was educated at Haywards Heath Grammar School (now Central Sussex College). He left school at 16 and went to Warsash College of Nautical Studies (which later merged to form Southampton Solent University) before joining the Merchant Navy as a deck officer. He served six years, achieving the rank of Second Officer.

== Early police career ==
Leaving the Merchant Navy, he joined Sussex Police in 1981, and had been promoted to Superintendent by 1992. As a Superintendent and Chief Superintendent he was Head of Personnel and later Divisional Commander of a large Operational Command Unit, which included Crawley. In 1996, he was appointed Force Crime Manager for Sussex, which made him responsible for force-level intelligence, crime and drugs operations, scientific support and major crime investigations. He took the Strategic Command Course at the Police Staff College, Bramshill in 1999. He also received a BA (Hons) degree in Public Sector Police Studies from the University of Portsmouth and a Diploma in Applied Criminology from the University of Cambridge, where he studied at Fitzwilliam College.

== Metropolitan Police ==
He was appointed Commander in the Metropolitan Police in November 1999 and served as Commander (Crime) for South London, South East Territorial Commander, and then Commander Crime for Territorial Policing. He was promoted to Deputy Assistant Commissioner in Territorial Policing in 2001, then to Assistant Commissioner a year later, making him responsible for everyday policing. During his time in Territorial Policing, he introduced a revitalised forensic strategy, instigated and led the Safer Streets Initiative (which saw robbery reduce by 30 per cent in three years), and through Operation Sapphire he oversaw a complete overhaul of the Metropolitan Police's approach to the investigation of serious sexual assault. This included the introduction of a number of "havens" in London, in partnership with the National Health Service, where rape victims can receive immediate medical and psychological support in a non-police environment. Godwin led the National Reassurance Policing Programme with Denis O'Connor. He was also responsible for the implementation of the Safer Neighbourhoods Programme, delivering dedicated teams of officers to wards throughout London.

He was the Association of Chief Police Officers (ACPO) lead on Criminal Justice, tasked with reducing bureaucracy in the preparation of cases and improving integration and working practices with the Crown Prosecution Service, and also the ACPO lead on Mobile Phone Crime, a role he first performed as Assistant Commissioner. He chaired the London Criminal Justice Board.

Following the promotion of Sir Paul Stephenson to Commissioner, Godwin served as Acting Deputy Commissioner from January 2009 until he was sworn in on 16 July 2009. He then spent a brief period as Britain's most senior police officer as Acting Commissioner from July 2011 until the post was permanently filled by Bernard Hogan-Howe, a former Chief Constable of Merseyside Police in September 2011.

== Honours and awards ==
He received the Royal Humane Society Testimonial in 1991 for rescuing a man from a high bridge over a railway line, was awarded the runner up prize for Equal Opportunities Achievement in the Police Service by the Home Secretary in 1996, and in 1998 received the National Prize for Public Management Leadership from the Office for Public Management.

Godwin was appointed an Officer of the Order of the British Empire (OBE) in the 2003 New Year Honours. He was awarded the Queen's Police Medal (QPM) for services to policing in The Queen's 2009 New Year Honours' List.

Ribbon	Description	Notes
	Order of the British Empire (OBE)	2003; Officer; Civil Division
	Queen's Police Medal (QPM)	2009
	Queen Elizabeth II Golden Jubilee Medal	2002; UK Version of this Medal
	Police Long Service and Good Conduct Medal	

Police appointments
Preceded by Michael J. Todd	Assistant Commissioner Territorial Policing, Metropolitan Police; 2002–2008	Succeeded by Ian McPherson
Preceded by Sir Paul Stephenson	Deputy Commissioner of Police of the Metropolis; 2009–2011	Succeeded by Bernard Hogan-Howe as Acting Deputy Commissioner
Preceded by Sir Paul Stephenson	Commissioner of Police of the Metropolis; Acting; July 2011 – September 2011	Succeeded by Bernard Hogan-Howe
