= Hinde House 2-16 School =

Hinde House School

Location
- Shiregreen Lane; Shiregreen; Sheffield, South Yorkshire, S5 6AG; England; 53.4203°N 1.4325°W

Information
- Type: Academy
- Local authority: Sheffield City Council
- Department for Education URN: 139856 Tables
- Ofsted: Reports
- Executive principal: Dan Cross
- Gender: Mixed
- Age: 2 to 16
- Website: www.hindehouse.net

Hinde House School is a mixed all-through school for pupils aged 2 to 16. The school is in the Shiregreen area of Sheffield, South Yorkshire, England.

== History ==
Hinde House was the first state-funded all-through school for both primary and secondary school education in the country. In 2005, the school moved to a new building and expanded its primary provision in 2012. In July 2013, the school converted to academy status and is now part of the Brigantia Learning Trust which includes the nearby Concord Junior School and Wincobank Nursery and Infant School.

The school mainly takes pupils from the Darnall, Shiregreen, Tinsley and Wincobank areas of Sheffield, and offers a range of GCSEs as programmes of study for pupils.

The school is built on the site of the former Hinde House Secondary Modern School, dating from 1956, which amalgamated with Owler Lane Intermediate School in 1963 to become Hinde House Comprehensive School.

Bernard Hogan-Howe, who was a pupil in the 1960s and 1970s, has said of the school then "It wasn’t Eton, put it that way ... We only had two riots. They weren’t too bad".

== Notable former pupils ==
=== Hinde House Comprehensive ===
- Naseem Hamed, former world featherweight boxing champion
- Bernard Hogan-Howe, Commissioner of Police of the Metropolis
- Steve Mackey, bass guitarist for Pulp
