= Craig Mackey =

British police officer

Sir Craig Mackey QPM
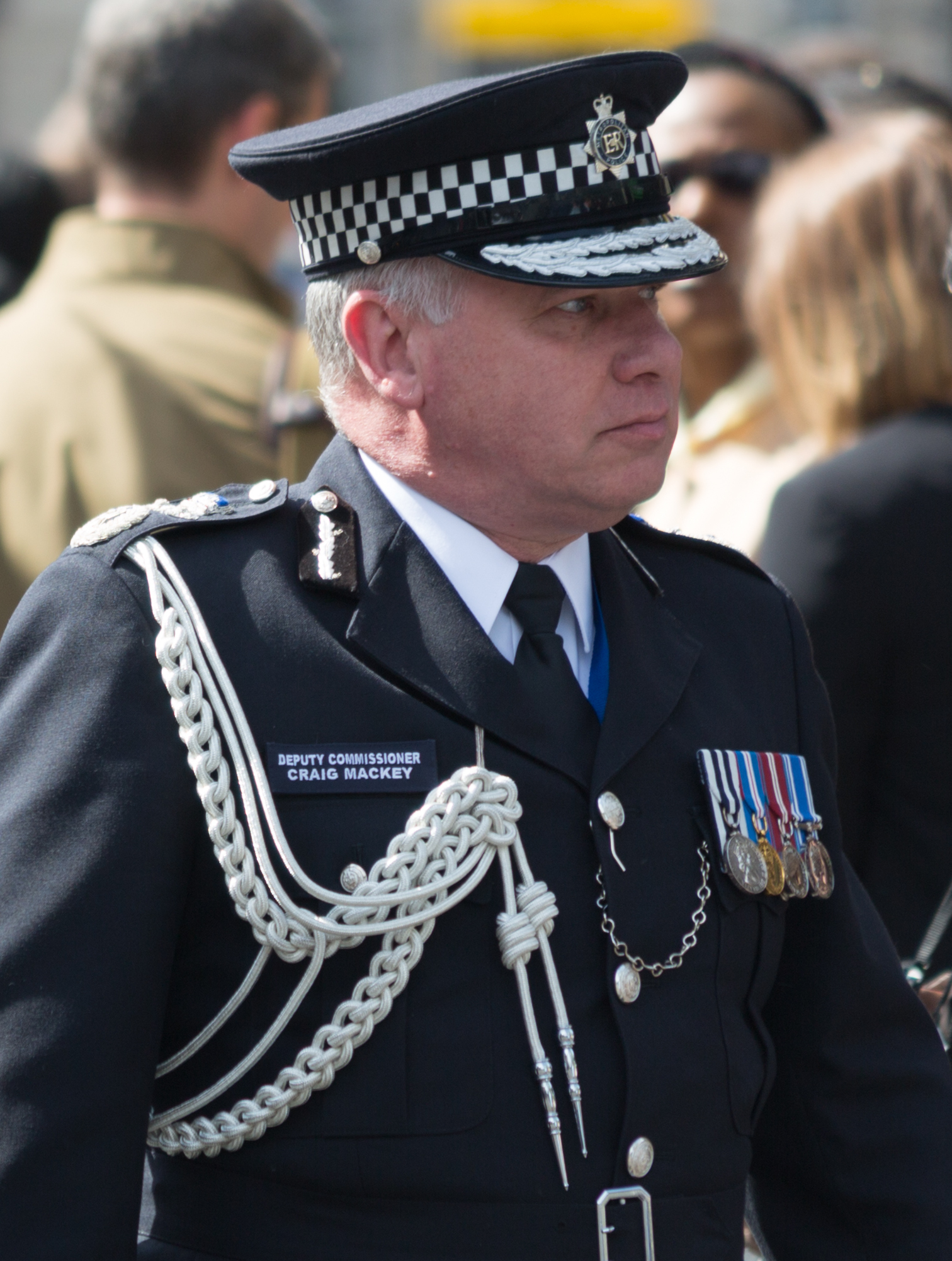
- Mackey in April 2017

Deputy Commissioner of Police of the Metropolis
- In office January 2012 – December 2018
- Leader: Sir Bernard Hogan-Howe; Cressida Dick
- Preceded by: Tim Godwin
- Succeeded by: Sir Stephen House

Chief Constable of Cumbria Police
- In office September 2007 – January 2012

Personal details
- Born: Craig Thomas Mackey; 26 August 1962 (age 63) Carlisle, Cumbria, England
- Website: Profile

Sir Craig Thomas Mackey, QPM (born 26 August 1962) is a former British police officer who served as Deputy Commissioner of London's Metropolitan Police Service from 2012 until his retirement in 2018. He previously held senior roles as Chief Constable of Cumbria Constabulary, in addition to chief officer posts in Wiltshire Constabulary, Gloucestershire Constabulary, and a specialist staff officer role in Her Majesty's Inspectorate of Constabulary (HMIC).

== Early life and education ==
Mackey was born on 26 August 1962 in Carlisle, Cumbria, England. Having studied with the Open University, he has a Bachelor of Science (BSc) degree and postgraduate diplomas in economics and criminal justice.

== Police career ==
Mackey joined Wiltshire Constabulary in 1984. In 2001, he transferred to Gloucestershire Constabulary to become its Assistant Chief Constable, and then Deputy Chief Constable. In September 2007, Mackey joined Cumbria Constabulary as its Chief Constable, a post he remained in until his appointment as the Metropolitan Police Deputy Commissioner in 2012. Mackey served as the Acting Commissioner of the Metropolitan Police between 22 February and 10 April 2017.

On 22 March 2017, while acting as Commissioner of the Metropolitan Police, Mackey was on a routine visit to the Palace of Westminster. He was there during the 2017 Westminster attack and was described as a "significant witness". As a result of this, it was claimed he could not issue any public statements, including any responses to negative commentary regarding his conduct. Much of that negative commentary compared Mackey’s actions unfavourably with those of the armed protection officer who shot Khalid Masood (the attacker) dead. Gaby Hinsliff wrote in The Guardian: "A Met chief stayed in his car during an attack. That’s not leadership." Her article stated that "… what apparently most enrages those officers now condemning Mackey is a sense that their own leaders wouldn’t do what is asked of them every day, and that perhaps speaks to a more deep-rooted sense of betrayal going back years. It’s horribly unfair to call Craig Mackey a coward, particularly from the safety of civilian armchairs. He made what was in all probability the cowardly decision. But it does not, somehow, look like the decision of a leader. In fact it stinks of the 'do as I say, not as I do' double standards of today's politically sensitive police service management".

Subsequently, at the inquest into the death of Masood, the chief coroner of England and Wales, Mark Lucraft QC, described Mackey’s actions as "sensible and proper and intended to protect others in the car". Lucraft said Mackey did not flee the scene. "You may well think that it was important for the most senior police officer in the country to be at New Scotland Yard, where he could take command and control of what, at that time, could potentially have been part of a much larger attack".

Mackey retired from the police service in December 2018. On 5 October 2018, Sir Stephen House was announced by the Government as Sir Craig's successor as Deputy Commissioner of the Metropolitan Police Service.

== Honours ==
Mackey was awarded the Queen's Police Medal for Distinguished Service in the 2009 New Year Honours and appointed a Knight Bachelor in the 2018 New Year Honours for services to policing.

Knight Bachelor	2018 New Year Honours
Queen's Police Medal (QPM)	2009 New Year Honours
Queen Elizabeth II Golden Jubilee Medal	2002
Queen Elizabeth II Diamond Jubilee Medal	2012
Police Long Service and Good Conduct Medal	
