= Pauline Clare =

British police officer (born 1947)

Pauline Clare CBE QPM

Chief Constable of Lancashire Constabulary
- In office 27 July 1995 – 24 July 2002
- Monarch: Elizabeth II
- Home Secretary: Michael Howard; Jack Straw; David Blunkett
- Preceded by: Brian Johnson
- Succeeded by: Sir Paul Stephenson

Personal details
- Born: 26 July 1947 (age 79) Chorley, Lancashire, England
- Education: Open University
- Profession: Police officer

Pauline Ann Clare CBE QPM (born 26 July 1947) is a British former police officer who served as chief constable of Lancashire Constabulary from 1995 to 2002. She was the first female officer to lead a police force in the United Kingdom.

== Early life ==
Clare was born on 26 July 1947 in Chorley, Lancashire. Her father, a Co-op butcher, moved the family to Ribchester when Clare was young. They later returned to Chorley and Clare attended St Mary's Catholic Secondary Modern School in Leyland.

== Career ==
=== Police career ===
In 1964, aged 17, Clare joined Lancashire Constabulary as a police cadet. Two years later, in 1966, she became a police constable. Initially she served in Seaforth as part of a policewomen's division. Following this, she was posted to the Kirkby and Southport areas; in the latter area she obtained the rank of inspector. In 1974, she became part of the newly-formed Merseyside Police following local government reorganisation and spent 20 years as part of that force.

Over the course of her career she went on to serve at every uniformed rank in the British police. Within Merseyside Police she was promoted to the rank of chief inspector in 1983, covering Liverpool City Centre, superintendent in 1987, chief superintendent in 1991 and assistant chief constable in 1992. She was appointed deputy chief constable of Cheshire Constabulary in September 1994.

=== Time as chief constable ===
On 13 June 1995, Clare was appointed chief constable of Lancashire Constabulary, taking office on 27 July of that year, aged 48. She was the first woman chief constable in the UK. Early on into her tenure some journalists alleged that Clare had benefitted from positive discrimination, something she both denied and criticised as a practice. She was also questioned about her choice of perfume in her first press conference as chief constable which she expressed frustration at, implying that the question was sexist in its nature and irrelevant to her role.

During her time as chief constable she declared tackling violent crime and burglaries as her constabulary's top priorities and took a 'community based' and 'problem oriented' approach to tackling crime. By 2000, this approach had seen a 7.9% year on year fall in crime which was the highest in England and Wales.

In 2001, Clare presided over Lancashire Constabulary's handling of the Burnley riots where the police faced criticism for their slow response. In particular their response to the racially motivated assault of an Asian taxi driver in comparison to their response to the stabbing of a white man drew strong criticism from representatives of Burnley's Asian community.

Clare also oversaw a number of technological and structural changes to Lancashire Constabulary. In 1996, the constabulary transitioned from having 14 internal divisions to six larger divisions in a bid for greater efficiency and, towards the end of her tenure, she moved the force from analogue radio to the Airwave network.

Upon her departure from Lancashire Constabulary in 2002, it was rated by Her Majesty's Inspectorate of Constabulary as the best performing force in England and Wales.

=== Subsequent career ===
In 2002, at the end of her seven year contract with Lancashire Constabulary, Clare left the police and became an executive coach. She also served as director for a number of charities and community interest companies in Lancashire.

== Personal life ==
Clare is married to Stuart, a lawyer, and has two adult stepdaughters. Whilst serving with Merseyside Police, Clare attended night school and obtained an A-level in psychology. She later went on to obtain a degree in psychology from the Open University.

== Honours ==
In 1993, Clare was named Lancashire Woman of the Year and received the North West Woman of Achievement Award in 1995. A year later, in 1996, she was awarded the Queen's Police Medal. In 2002, Clare was appointed a Commander of the British Empire (CBE).
