= Bernard Hogan-Howe =

Commissioner of the Metropolitan Police 2011–2017

The Right Honourable The Lord Hogan-Howe QPM
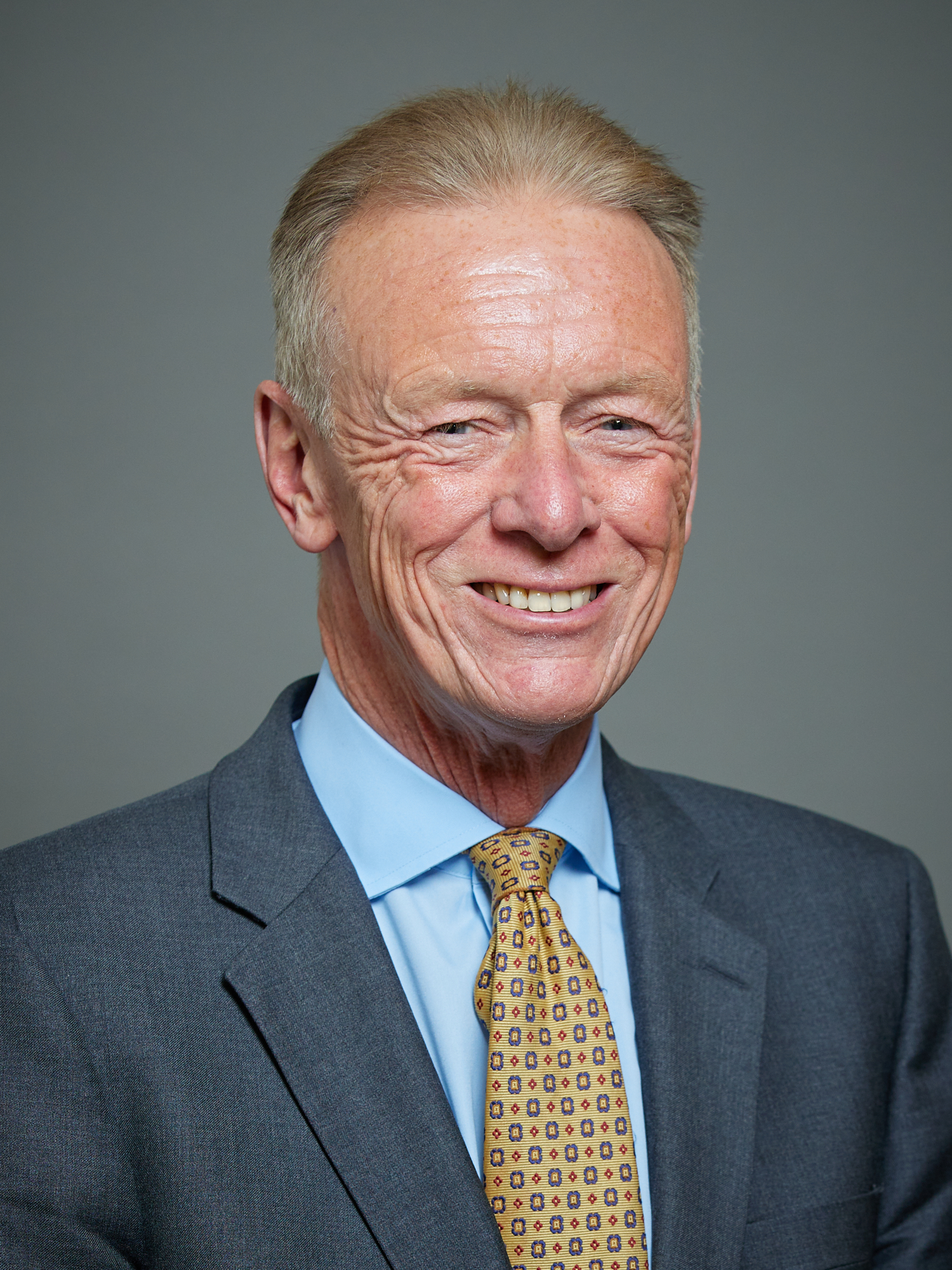
- Official portrait, 2022

Commissioner of Police of the Metropolis
- In office 12 September 2011 – 22 February 2017
- Monarch: Elizabeth II
- Deputy: Tim Godwin; Craig Mackey
- Home Secretary: Theresa May; Amber Rudd
- Mayor: Boris Johnson; Sadiq Khan
- Preceded by: Paul Stephenson
- Succeeded by: Cressida Dick

Chief Constable of Merseyside Police
- In office 2004–2009
- Preceded by: Sir Norman Bettison
- Succeeded by: Andy Cooke

Member of the House of Lords
- Lord Temporal
- Life peerage 7 November 2017

Personal details
- Born: Bernard Howe; 25 October 1957 (age 68) Sheffield, South Yorkshire, England
- Spouse(s): Marion White, Lady Hogan-Howe (m. 2008)
- Education: Merton College, Oxford (MA); Fitzwilliam College, Cambridge (Dipl. Crim.); University of Sheffield (MBA)
- Profession: Police officer

Bernard Hogan-Howe, Baron Hogan-Howe, QPM (born 25 October 1957) is an English former police officer and was the head of London's Metropolitan Police as Commissioner of Police of the Metropolis from 2011 until 2017.

Born in Sheffield, Hogan-Howe joined the South Yorkshire Police in 1979, becoming District Commander of the Doncaster West area, as well as obtaining university qualifications in law and criminology. In 1997, he transferred to Merseyside Police as Assistant Chief Constable for Community Affairs, moving on to area operations. He then joined the Metropolitan Police as Assistant Commissioner for personnel, before being appointed Chief Constable of Merseyside Police.

After two years as an Inspector of Constabulary, Hogan-Howe was briefly Acting Deputy Commissioner of the Metropolitan Police before being appointed Commissioner in September 2011.

Hogan-Howe was knighted in the 2013 New Year Honours for services to policing.

In March 2026, he was appointed head of the Independent Review of Police Force Structures that will lead to a smaller number of larger police forces across England and Wales.

== Early life and career ==
Bernard Howe was born in Sheffield, the son of Bernard Howe. He attended Hinde House Comprehensive School, where he completed his A-levels. He was brought up single-handedly by his mother, whose surname of Hogan he later added by deed poll. After leaving school, he spent four years working as a lab assistant in the National Health Service (NHS).

He began his police career in 1979 with South Yorkshire Police and rose to be District Commander of the Doncaster West area. In 1997, he transferred to Merseyside Police as Assistant Chief Constable for Community Affairs, moving onto area operations in 1999. Hogan-Howe then once again transferred this time to the Metropolitan Police as Assistant Commissioner for personnel, July 2001 – 2004. He was then appointed Chief Constable of Merseyside Police, 2005–9.

Whilst still with South Yorkshire Police, he was identified as a high-flier and selected to study for a MA degree in Law at Merton College, Oxford, which he began at the age of 28. He later went on to gain a postgraduate diploma in Applied Criminology from Fitzwilliam College, Cambridge, and an MBA from the University of Sheffield.

On Merseyside, Hogan-Howe had called for a "total war on crime" and argued that the health and safety case which was successfully brought against the Metropolitan Police after the de Menezes shooting was restrictive of allowing the police to do their work. He had also called for a review of the decision to downgrade cannabis from a class B to a class C drug. He thereafter served as one of Her Majesty's Inspectors of Constabulary, 2009–2011.

On 18 July 2011, the Home Secretary announced Hogan-Howe's temporary appointment as Acting Deputy Commissioner following the resignation of the Commissioner Sir Paul Stephenson, and the appointment of the incumbent Deputy Commissioner as Acting Commissioner. During that period, a decision was made within the department of professional standards to use the Official Secrets Act to compel The Guardian to reveal its sources regarding the News International phone hacking scandal. The order was swiftly rescinded five days prior to Hogan-Howe's formal term of office.

== Commissioner ==
Hogan-Howe applied for the position of Commissioner himself in August 2011 along with other candidates, and was successful in being selected for the post on 12 September 2011. He appeared before a panel of the Home Secretary and the Mayor of London and received the approval of the chairman of the Metropolitan Police Authority, before he was formally appointed by the Queen, with effect from 26 September.

In 2013, Hogan-Howe was criticised for defending police officers who had, according to an appeal court ruling, used "inhuman and degrading treatment", in breach of the Human Rights Act, when handling an autistic boy in a swimming pool. The criticism was specifically directed against the public money spent on the appeal and his refusal to apologise and to improve police officer training for the humane treatment of disabled people. In September 2012, Hogan-Howe asked for an independent commission headed by Lord Adebowale to review cases where people with a mental illness died or were harmed after contact with police. The report arrived in May 2013 and contained severe criticism; Hogan-Howe responded to the commission's recommendations with a plan for change, announced in June 2014.

=== The 'Total Policing' vision ===
Hogan-Howe outlined his vision for 'Total Policing' in 2011 shortly after becoming Commissioner. This vision sought to promote total professionalism from the workforce, a total war on crime and total care for victims. It was hoped that the 'Total Policing' vision would benefit from a commitment to 'total technology' – involving the roll-out of new technology across the Met, including tablet computers, body worn video and a major overhaul of the Met's existing IT systems. In a question and answer session following his valedictory speech at the Royal United Services Institute in February 2017, Hogan-Howe expressed regret at having not embarked upon the IT programme earlier.

=== Historical sexual abuse cases ===
Hogan-Howe served as Commissioner in the aftermath of the Jimmy Savile sexual abuse scandal in 2012, after which more allegations of historic sexual abuse were made to police and police began a following guidance by Her Majesty's Inspector of Constabulary that "the presumption that a victim should always be believed should be institutionalised". Operation Yewtree, which was set up by the Met following the Savile scandal, saw many celebrities arrested and repeatedly bailed without charge. As a result, then-Home Secretary Theresa May proposed that bail time be limited to 28 days and Hogan-Howe supported the proposal. The 28-day limit came into effect in April 2017. Broadcaster Paul Gambaccini was arrested by Operation Yewtree police and spent a year on bail before being told he would not face charges. Gambaccini described Hogan-Howe as "the villain of my life" and that he "attempted to destroy my life and end my career for their own public relations purposes in a 100 per cent fraud".

The Met launched Operation Midland in 2014 after Carl Beech, then known publicly under the pseudonym "Nick", alleged that several high-profile men had abused him and that he had witnessed them murder three boys. DS Kenny McDonald issued a statement in which he said that they believed Beech's allegations were "credible and true" but the probe was closed after 16 months when no evidence was found to corroborate the claims. Hogan-Howe initially refused to apologise to those wrongly accused by Beech, but did so after a report by Richard Henriques detailed numerous failings by the Met and found that those accused were victims of false allegations. After these failings, Hogan-Howe called for the Met to change their approach, and no longer automatically believe complainants. Beech was later convicted of charges related to lying to the police in July 2019 and was sentenced to 18 years.

=== Position on ISIS supporters ===
Hogan-Howe was criticised in the wake of the 2015 Sousse attacks, after a father and his young daughter paraded at Parliament Square with the flag of ISIS (ISIL). Hogan-Howe supported his officers after they had refused to arrest the pair, and said that carrying an ISIS flag is 'not necessarily the worst thing in the world' and should not lead to an automatic arrest. This was contrary to an earlier statement by the then Prime Minister, who had written that "The position is clear. If people are walking around with ISIL flags or trying to recruit people to their terrorist cause, they will be arrested and their materials will be seized."

Hogan-Howe was later supported by the Mayor of London, Boris Johnson, who said that 'we live in a free country' and that he did not support the banning of iconography associated with the extremist group.

=== Staff confidence in senior leadership of the Metropolitan Police ===
In 2014, a Metropolitan Police internal staff survey was conducted. In response to the question "I have confidence in the leadership provided by the senior leaders in the Met" only 1 in 5 respondents agreed, whilst 3 in 5 disagreed with this statement.

=== Stops interview to make arrest ===
In 2014, Hogan-Howe was taking part in an interview for the BBC when a taxi driver approached and said his passengers were refusing to pay and had stolen some money. Hogan-Howe and another police officer jumped into the taxi and chased the suspects. One of the suspects was located a short distance away and was arrested by Hogan-Howe. This resulted in him having made at least one arrest at every police rank.

=== Institutional racism ===
In June 2015, Hogan-Howe said there was some justification in claims that the Metropolitan Police is institutionally racist.

=== Retirement ===
In September 2016, Hogan-Howe announced that he planned to retire in February 2017. He was succeeded as Commissioner by Dame Cressida Dick.

== Police Roll of Honour Trust ==
In November 2013, the then Sir Bernard Hogan-Howe took up the role of Patron of the national police charity the Police Roll of Honour Trust. He joined Sir Stephen House and Sir Hugh Orde as joint patrons.

== Honours and awards ==
Hogan-Howe was awarded the Queen's Police Medal (QPM) in the 2003 Birthday Honours

Hogan-Howe was knighted in the 2013 New Year Honours for services to policing, being invested with the honour on 21 May 2013.

Hogan-Howe's honours and decorations include:

Ribbon	Description	Notes
	Knight Bachelor	2013
	Queen's Police Medal (QPM)	2003
	Queen Elizabeth II Golden Jubilee Medal	2002; UK Version of this Medal
	Queen Elizabeth II Diamond Jubilee Medal	2012; UK Version of this Medal
	Police Long Service and Good Conduct Medal	

On 14 November 2012, Hogan-Howe was awarded the Honorary degree of Doctor of the University (DUniv) by Sheffield Hallam University.

On 15 July 2013, Hogan-Howe was awarded an honorary doctorate of Laws (LLD) by the University of Sheffield. On 13 December 2022, Hogan-Howe was bestowed with an Honorary Doctorate from Royal Holloway, University of London.

On 7 November 2017, Hogan-Howe was created a life peer. He took the title Baron Hogan-Howe, of Sheffield in the County of South Yorkshire.

Police appointments
Preceded by Sir Norman Bettison	Chief Constable of Merseyside Police; 2004–2009	Succeeded by Bernard Lawson (Acting)
Preceded by Sir Paul Stephenson	Commissioner of Police of the Metropolis; 2011–2017	Succeeded by Dame Cressida Dick
Orders of precedence in the United Kingdom
Preceded by The Lord Geidt	Gentlemen; Baron Hogan-Howe	Followed by The Lord Houghton of Richmond
