= West Germany v France (1982 FIFA World Cup) =

1982 FIFA World Cup semi-final
Night of Seville Nacht von Sevilla Nuit de Séville
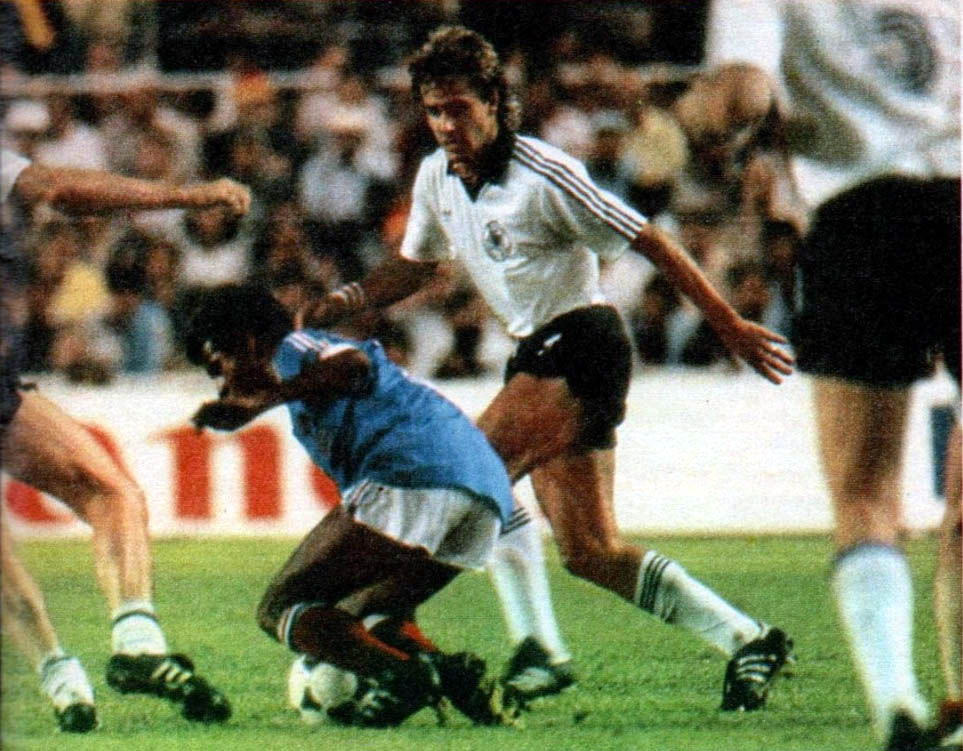
- Jean Tigana marked by German players
- Event: 1982 FIFA World Cup
West Germany	France
(West Germany)	(France)
3	3
- After extra time West Germany won 5–4 on penalties
- Date: 8 July 1982
- Venue: Ramón Sánchez Pizjuán Stadium, Seville
- Referee: Charles Corver (Netherlands)
- Attendance: 70,000

On 8 July 1982, West Germany and France played in the semi-finals of the 1982 FIFA World Cup at the Ramón Sánchez Pizjuán Stadium in Seville, Spain. The match is known in both countries as the Night of Seville (German: Nacht von Sevilla, French: Nuit de Séville).

The match was won by West Germany 5–4 on penalties. They advanced to face Italy in the final. Thanks to its back-and-forth drama, four goals in extra time and a dramatic penalty shoot-out, the match is regarded as one of the best football matches of all time. It is considered by French captain Michel Platini to be his "most beautiful game." West Germany's victory was the first match in the history of the World Cup whose outcome was determined by a penalty shoot-out. The penalty shoot-out rule was already in place since the 1974 FIFA World Cup, but it had not been used in the four matches that would require it in the two tournaments prior (the matches for third place and the finals).

== Venue ==
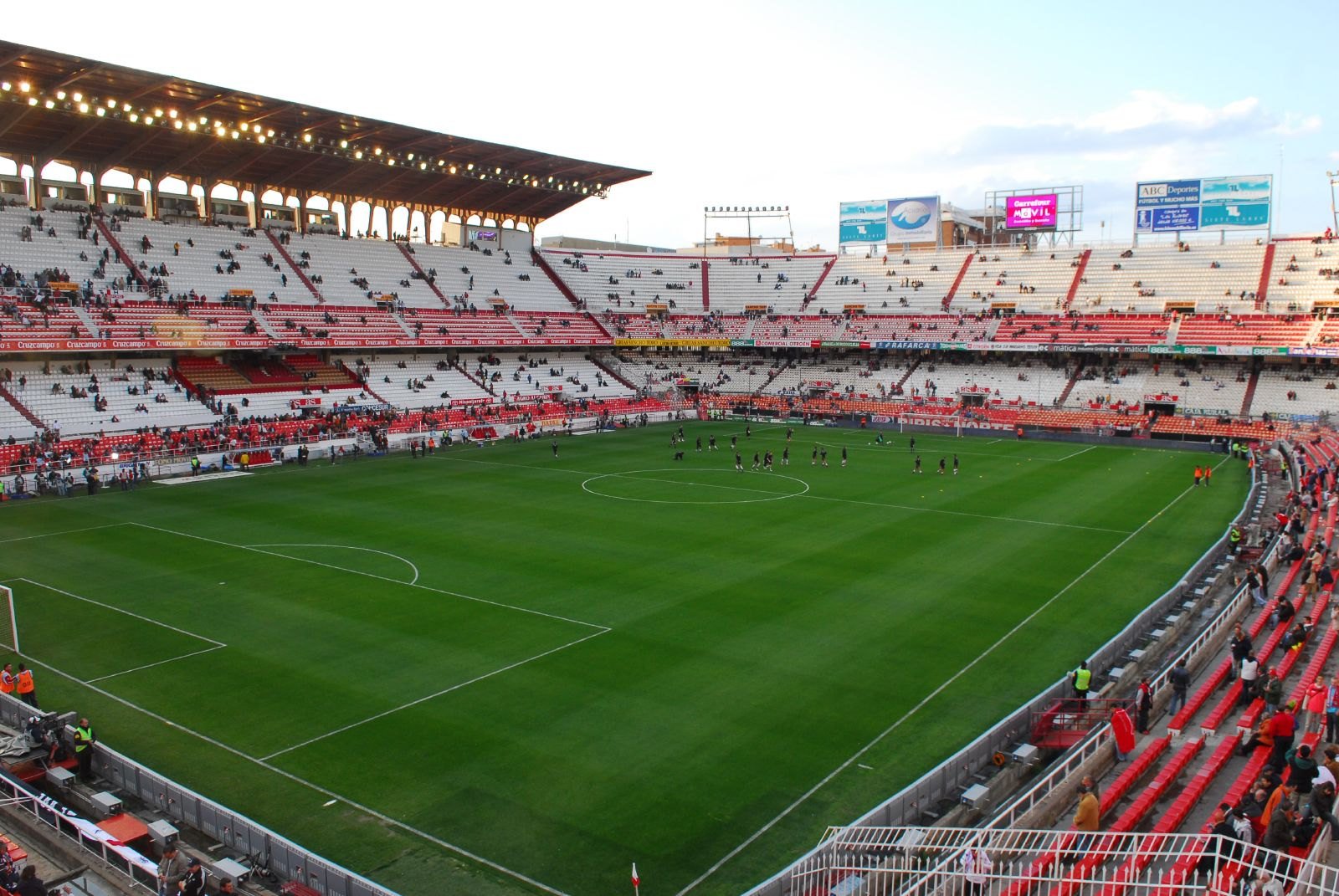
Ramón Sánchez Pizjuán Stadium, venue of the match

The match was held in Ramón Sánchez-Pizjuán Stadium, home stadium of Sevilla FC and named after the club's former president, Ramón Sánchez-Pizjuán (1900–1956).

Sánchez-Pizjuán Stadium is nicknamed La Bombonera, more commonly used to refer to Estadio Alberto J. Armando, the home stadium of Boca Juniors. The Spain national team has never lost a game against an international team in this stadium. Opened in 1958, the stadium has capacity for 42,714 spectators.

== Match ==
=== Summary ===
This match, like a number of other matches at this tournament, started at nine o'clock in the evening, because July daily high temperatures in the south-western Spanish city of Seville averaged 37 °C (99 °F); the hot weather during the tournament had already taken a toll on the players. The day of the match had been very hot- it had hit 36.0 °C (96.8 °F) by 18:30 and the temperature at 21:00 was still 32 °C (90 °F).

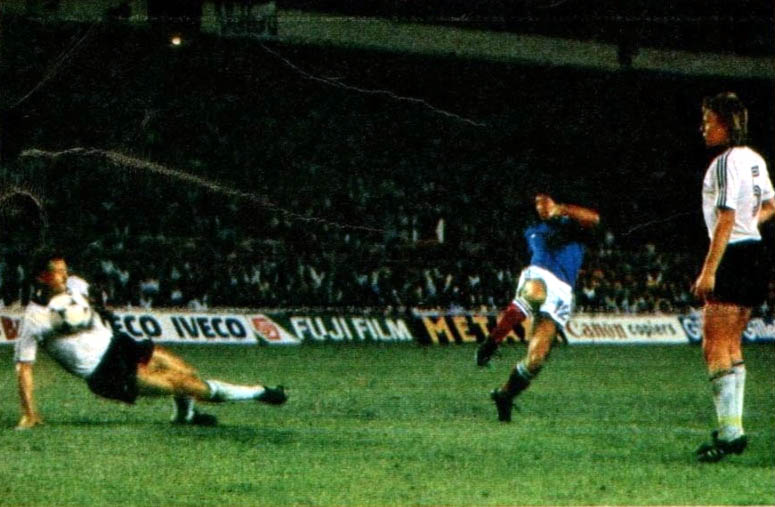
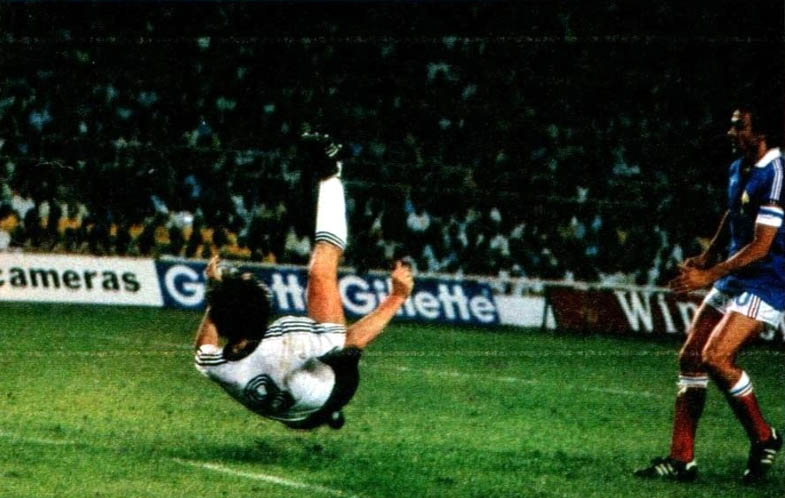
(Left): Alain Giresse scoring for the 3–1, Francia taking the lead; (right): Klaus Fischer's bicycle kick to score the 3–3, forcing the extra time

With West Germany's captain and European Footballer of the Year Karl-Heinz Rummenigge benched from the start due to a hamstring injury, West Germany were nonetheless the first to score, in the 17th minute. With Klaus Fischer charging in to challenge the French goalkeeper Jean-Luc Ettori from about 12 yards out, the ball rebounded to Pierre Littbarski, who scored with a first-time shot from 18 yards.

After 27 minutes, Bernd Förster was penalised for holding Dominique Rocheteau and France were awarded a penalty, which was converted by Platini.

Despite several good chances for both sides, including Manuel Amoros hitting the crossbar in stoppage time, the score remained at 1–1 at full time. The teams then played two 15-minute periods of extra time. In the second minute of the first period, Marius Tresor struck an 11-yard volley after a deflected free kick from just outside the box to put France ahead for the first time in the match, 2–1. Rummenigge entered the game shortly afterwards in place of Hans-Peter Briegel, but it was France who struck once again at the 98 minute mark, with Alain Giresse firing a first-time shot from 18 yards off Harald Schumacher's right post and into the goal to give France a 3–1 advantage.

Penalty shoot-out
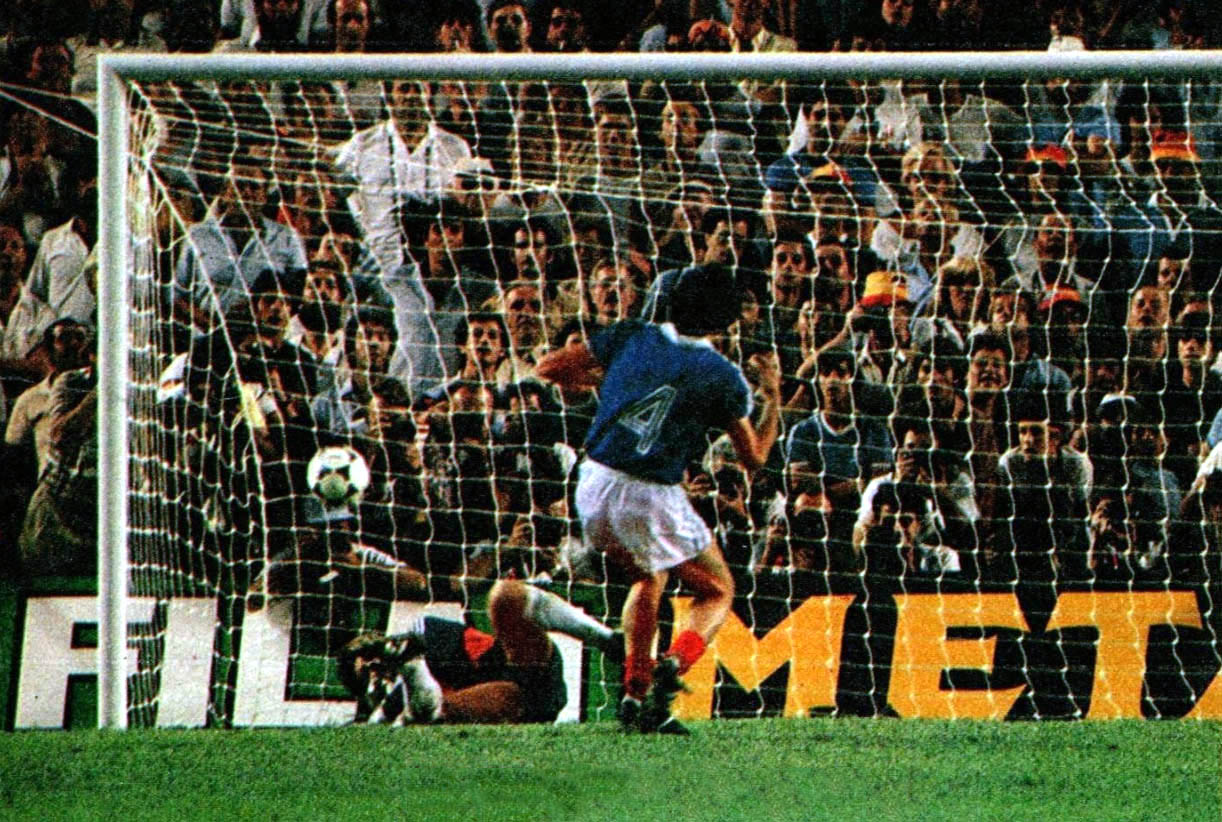
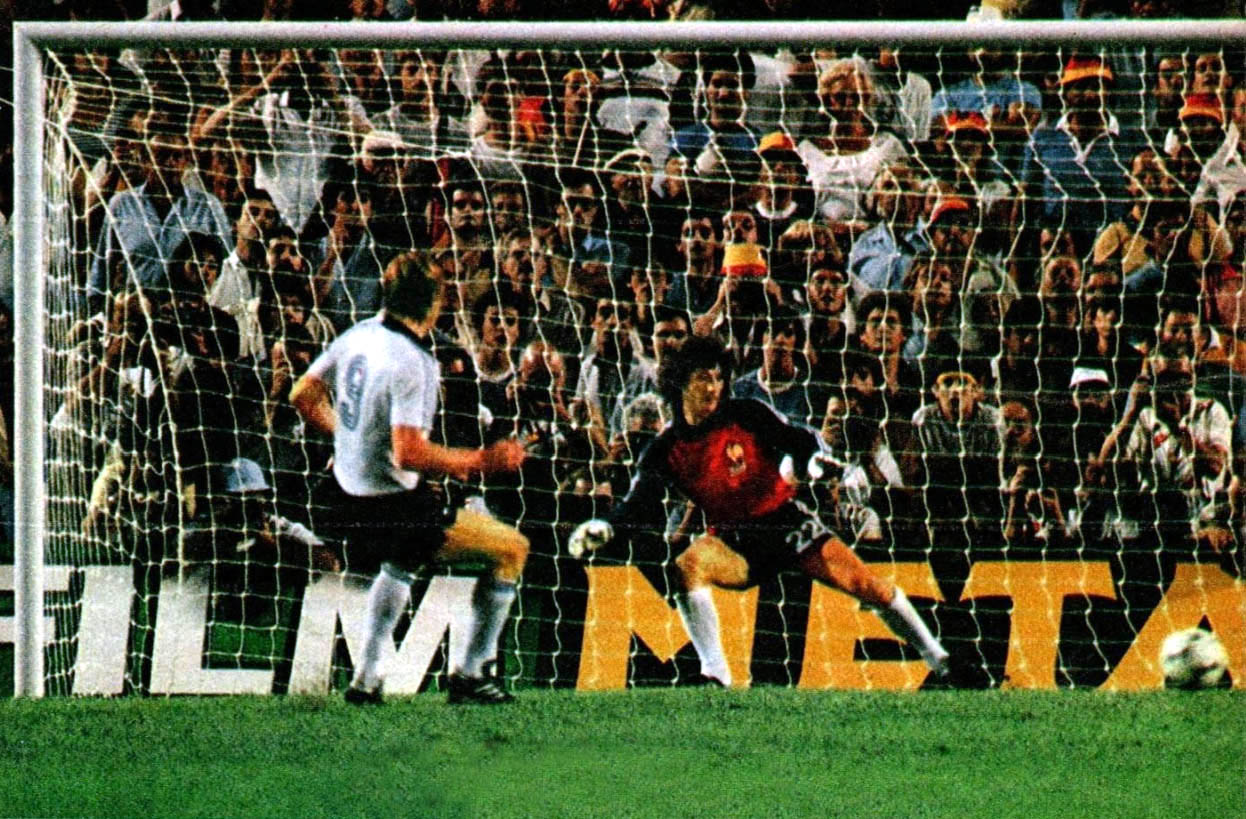
(Left): Maxime Bossis misses the last penalty for France; (right): Horst Hrubesch scoring for the 5-4 win that qualified Germany to the final

Four minutes later, West Germany began their comeback, with Rummenigge flicking home an outside-of-the-foot volley from six yards that cut France's lead in half. Three minutes into the second extra time period, Fischer scored with a bicycle kick from six yards, and the teams were level once more at 3–3, where the score remained until the end of extra time.

The penalty shoot-out began with Giresse converting the first kick for France, which was answered by West Germany's Manfred Kaltz. Amoros for France and Paul Breitner for West Germany both converted, but in the third round, Uli Stielike's shot was blocked by Ettori, following Rocheteau's successful strike, giving France a 3–2 lead. However, in the fourth round, France failed to capitalise: Schumacher blocked Didier Six's shot, and Littbarski scored for West Germany. Platini and Rummenigge both scored in the fifth round, and the shoot-out, tied at 4–4, moved to sudden-death. In the sixth round, Maxime Bossis's shot was blocked, and Horst Hrubesch converted to give West Germany the win.

=== Details ===
8 July 1982
21:00 CEST

West Germany	3–3 (a.e.t.)	France
Littbarski 17'; Rummenigge 102'; Fischer 108'		Platini 26' (pen.); Trésor 92'; Giresse 98'
Penalties
Kaltz (penalty scored); Breitner (penalty scored); Stielike (penalty missed); Littbarski (penalty scored); Rummenigge (penalty scored); Hrubesch (penalty scored)	5–4	(penalty scored) Giresse; (penalty scored) Amoros; (penalty scored) Rocheteau; (penalty missed) Six; (penalty scored) Platini; (penalty missed) Bossis

Ramón Sánchez Pizjuán Stadium, Seville
Attendance: 70,000
Referee: Charles Corver (Netherlands)

West Germany	France

GK	1	Harald Schumacher
SW	15	Uli Stielike
CB	4	Karlheinz Förster
CB	5	Bernd Förster	(yellow card) 46'
RWB	20	Manfred Kaltz (c)
LWB	2	Hans-Peter Briegel		(substituted off) 97'
DM	6	Wolfgang Dremmler
DM	3	Paul Breitner
RM	7	Pierre Littbarski
LM	14	Felix Magath		(substituted off) 73'
CF	8	Klaus Fischer
Substitutions:
GK	21	Bernd Franke
FW	9	Horst Hrubesch		(substituted on) 73'
MF	10	Hansi Müller
FW	11	Karl-Heinz Rummenigge		(substituted on) 97'
DF	12	Wilfried Hannes
Manager:
Jupp Derwall

GK	22	Jean-Luc Ettori
RB	2	Manuel Amoros
CB	5	Gérard Janvion
CB	8	Marius Trésor
LB	4	Maxime Bossis
DM	9	Bernard Genghini	(yellow card) 40'	(substituted off) 50'
CM	12	Alain Giresse	(yellow card) 35'
CM	14	Jean Tigana
AM	10	Michel Platini (c)
CF	18	Dominique Rocheteau
CF	19	Didier Six
Substitutions:
GK	21	Jean Castaneda
DF	3	Patrick Battiston		(substituted on) 50'	(substituted off) 60'
DF	6	Christian Lopez		(substituted on) 60'
FW	15	Bruno Bellone
FW	20	Gérard Soler
Manager:
Michel Hidalgo

Linesmen:
Bruno Galler (Switzerland)
Bob Valentine (Scotland)

Match rules:

- 90 minutes
- 30 minutes of extra time if scores level after 90 minutes
- Penalty shoot-out if scores still level after extra time
- Five substitutes named, of which two may be used

== Controversy ==
In the second half, the West German goalkeeper Schumacher jumped into the French player Patrick Battiston, which knocked Battiston unconscious and forced him from the game with two missing teeth, three cracked ribs, and damaged vertebrae, though no foul was given. France were forced to use their second and final substitution to replace Battiston, who himself had come on only ten minutes earlier. By contrast, West Germany were able to use their own second substitution to bring on Rummenigge in extra time, and he scored five minutes after taking the field.

== See also ==
- France–Germany football rivalry
- France at the FIFA World Cup
- Germany at the FIFA World Cup
