= The Golden Boot =

Shoe shop in Maidstone, Kent, England

The Golden Boot is a family-run shoe shop located in Maidstone, Kent, United Kingdom.

It was founded in 1790 and was formerly known as Randall's Boot Warehouse.

== History ==
Established in 1790, the company has been owned by the same family for six generations. The original site of the shop was at Gabriels Hill. It opened workshops in 1845 in Palace Yard. A large Golden Wellington measuring over 6 ft was put up outside the shop in the late 19th century and remains there to this day. Now the Golden Boot has three departments selling ladies, men's and children's shoes and leather goods.

== Awards ==
The Golden Boot shoe shop is the winner of awards from Drapers Footwear for 2006 and 2010 and Family Footwear Retailer of the Year 2008.

== See also ==
- Bacup Shoe Company
- The Chelsea Cobbler
