= Ian McPherson (police officer) =

British police officer

Ian McPherson QPM

Assistant Commissioner Territorial Policing, Metropolitan Police
- In office 2009–2011

Chief Constable of Norfolk
- In office 2006–2009

Deputy Chief Constable of North Yorkshire
- In office 2005–2006

Personal details
- Born: Ian Andrew McPherson; 25 March 1961 (age 65) Preston, Lancashire, England

Ian Andrew McPherson QPM (born 25 March 1961) is a retired British police officer who is now a management consultant.

McPherson was born in Preston, Lancashire, the son of Ian Douglas and Mary Elizabeth (née Simpson) McPherson. He joined Lancashire Constabulary as a constable in Preston in 1979. He transferred to the Criminal Investigation Department as a detective constable in 1985 and transferred to Skelmersdale on promotion to detective sergeant in 1987. After being selected for the accelerated promotion course at Bramshill Police College, he was promoted to uniformed inspector in 1991 and was posted to Blackpool, later moving to the force headquarters at Hutton as head of the headquarters support unit dealing with public order. He was promoted to chief inspector in 1993 and became staff officer to Chief Constable Brian Johnson.

In 1995, he was transferred back to Preston as chief inspector operations, and later returned to headquarters as acting superintendent in charge of the organisational change unit. During this time, he travelled to the United States, Australia and Hong Kong to observe policing in those countries. After taking a year's sabbatical to complete an MBA at the University of Central Lancashire, he returned to Blackpool as superintendent operations of Blackpool and Fylde Division in 1998. On 14 November 1999, he was promoted to chief superintendent and took command of the Pennine Division, covering Burnley, Pendle and Rossendale. He gained a Diploma in Applied Criminology from the University of Cambridge in 2000.

In April 2001, after completing the senior command course at Bramshill, he transferred to Merseyside Police as Assistant Chief Constable Operations, and moved to be ACC Corporate Development four years later. He was then appointed deputy chief constable of North Yorkshire Police on 5 September 2005 and chief constable of Norfolk Constabulary in December 2006. There was criticism of his remuneration package, especially his resettlement package. He was awarded the Queen's Police Medal (QPM) in the 2009 New Year Honours.

In October 2009, he joined the Metropolitan Police in London as Assistant Commissioner Territorial Policing, serving until his retirement at the end of 2011. He was Association of Chief Police Officers national lead for children and young people from 2008 to 2011.

In 2012, he joined management consultants KPMG in Toronto as head of the Canadian justice and security practice and in 2015 transferred to Denver to head the justice and security sector throughout North America.

McPherson married Wendy Spence in 1984. They have a son and a daughter.

== Footnotes ==
Police appointments
Preceded by Unknown	Assistant Chief Constable Operations, Merseyside Police; 2001–2005	Succeeded by Unknown
Preceded by Unknown	Assistant Chief Constable Corporate Development, Merseyside Police; 2005	Succeeded by Unknown
Preceded by Roger Baker	Deputy Chief Constable of North Yorkshire; 2005–2006	Succeeded by Adam Briggs
Preceded by Carole Howlett	Chief Constable of Norfolk; 2006–2009	Succeeded by Phil Gormley
Preceded by Rose Fitzpatrick; Temporary	Assistant Commissioner Territorial Policing, Metropolitan Police; 2009–2011	Succeeded by Simon Byrne
