= Charles Corver =

Dutch football referee (1936–2020)

Charles George Reinier Corver
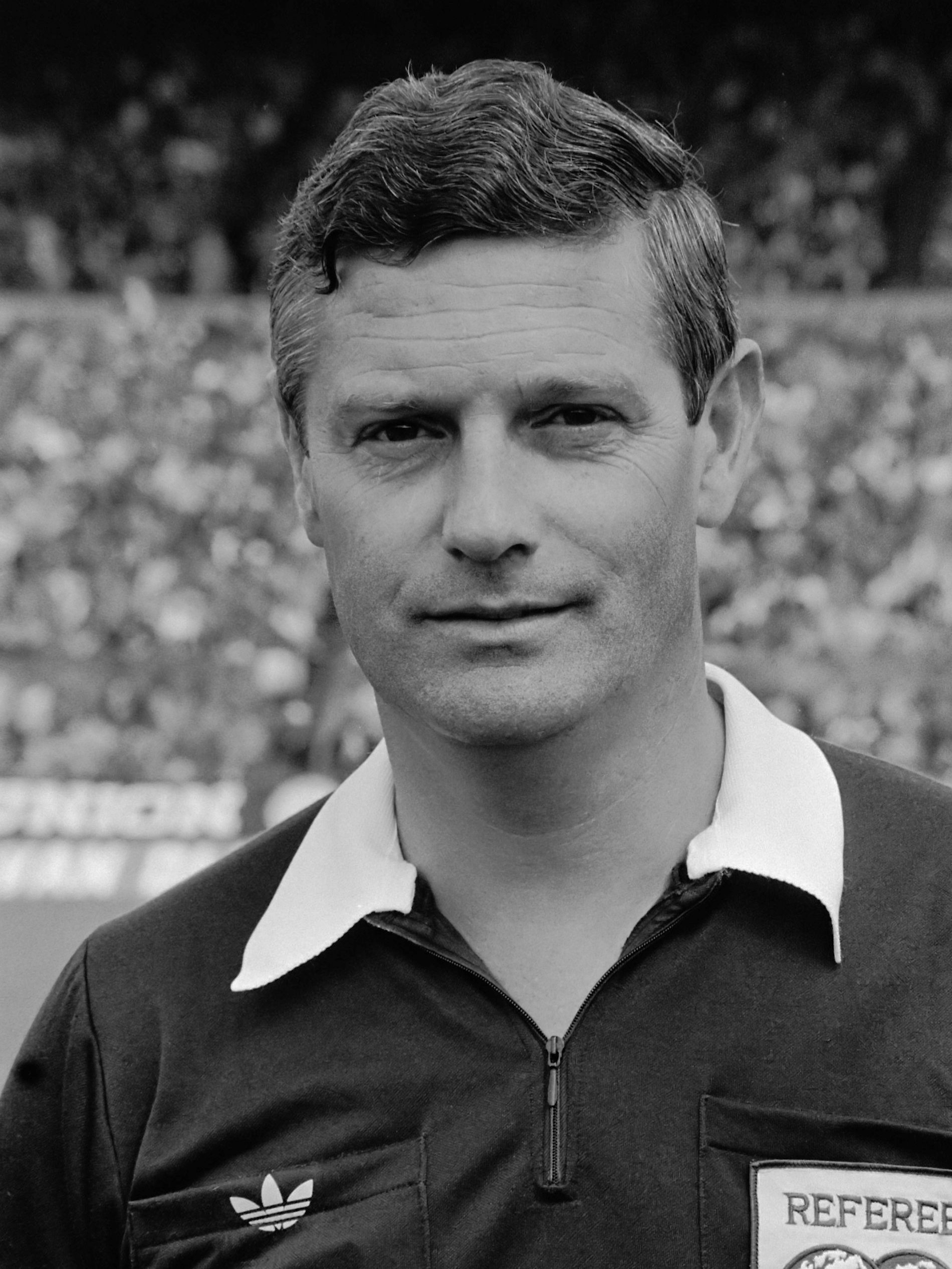
- Cover in 1980
- Born: 16 January 1936
- Died: 10 November 2020 (aged 84)
- Other occupation: sales manager, observer for UEFA-FIFA and KNVB

International
Years	League	Role
1972–1983	FIFA-listed	Referee

Charles George Reinier Corver (16 January 1936 – 10 November 2020) was a Dutch football referee.

== Career ==
He was decorated twice by the Queen (Order of Orange-Nassau) and the football association (KNVB-UEFA-FIFA).

He refereed the 1982 World Cup semifinal between Germany and France in Seville, Spain, when he deemed goalkeeper Harald Schumacher's collision with Patrick Battiston to be not a foul. Battiston remained unconscious for over a minute and sustained the loss of three teeth and a damaged vertebrae. This failure is often considered one of the worst examples of poor refereeing decisions in football.

Corver was a referee at two World Cups and two European championships. He refereed four European Cup finals, ten semifinals, and a final World Cup for clubs in Argentina. More than 140 international matches and more than 600 national matches. After his last final (1983) in Portugal he was an observer for UEFA-FIFA and KNVB for 22 years and a member of the disciplinary committee for sixteen years. His profession was national sales manager at Heineken.

Preceded by European Cup Final 1977 (France) Robert Wurtz	European Cup Referees; Final 1978 (Netherlands) Charles Corver	Succeeded by European Cup Final 1979 (Austria) Erich Linemayr
