= Bacup Shoe Company =

British footwear company

The Bacup Shoe Company
- Type: Private
- Industry: Footwear, Shoes
- Founded: 1928
- Founder: Ernst Goodwin
- Headquarters: Lancashire, England
- Subsidiaries: Redfoot
- Website: www.bacupshoe.com

The Bacup Shoe Company is a footwear company based in the village of Stacksteads, near Bacup, Lancashire, England. The Bacup Shoe Co. was founded in 1928 and incorporated in 1929 by Ernest Goodwin. The Bacup Shoe company was one of the last well known footwear manufacturers to stop manufacturing in the late 1990s and turn to importing footwear from the Far East. Suppliers are based in China (where the company is also based), Vietnam and Spain.

== History ==
The Bacup Shoe Company was founded in 1928 by Ernest Goodwin, a former footballer for Manchester City F.C., along with shoemaker Walter Smith. In 2002 the company opened a new division called Alpha Logistics & Warehousing to make full use of the available warehouse storage facilities and the talented local workforce. Along with the expansion of its headquarters the company has recently launched a new girls shoe brand, named Redfoot After Party Shoe, which are a patented range of foldable shoes.
