= Collar number =

Individual identification numbers used by British law enforcement

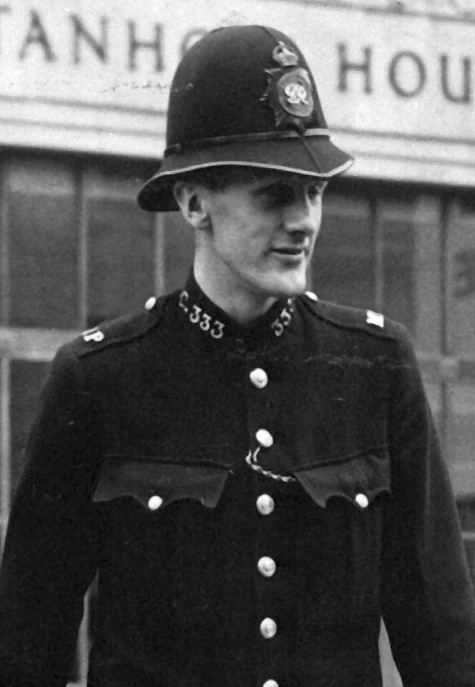
A constable in London with collar number visible, ca.1948

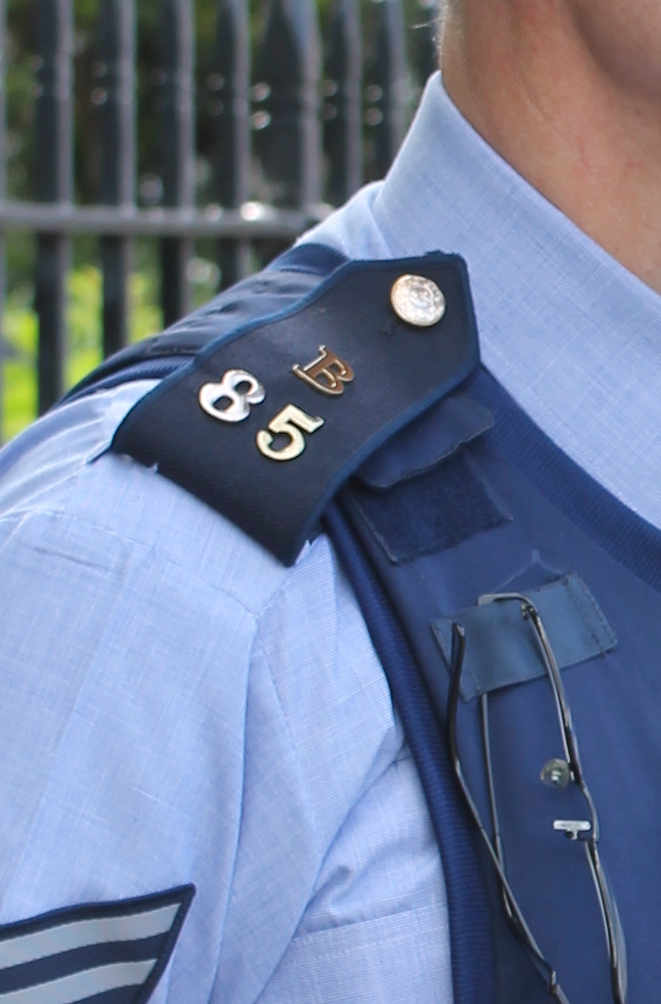
In Ireland, the epaulette worn by gardaí show the District/Region letter, as well as a number unique to each garda.

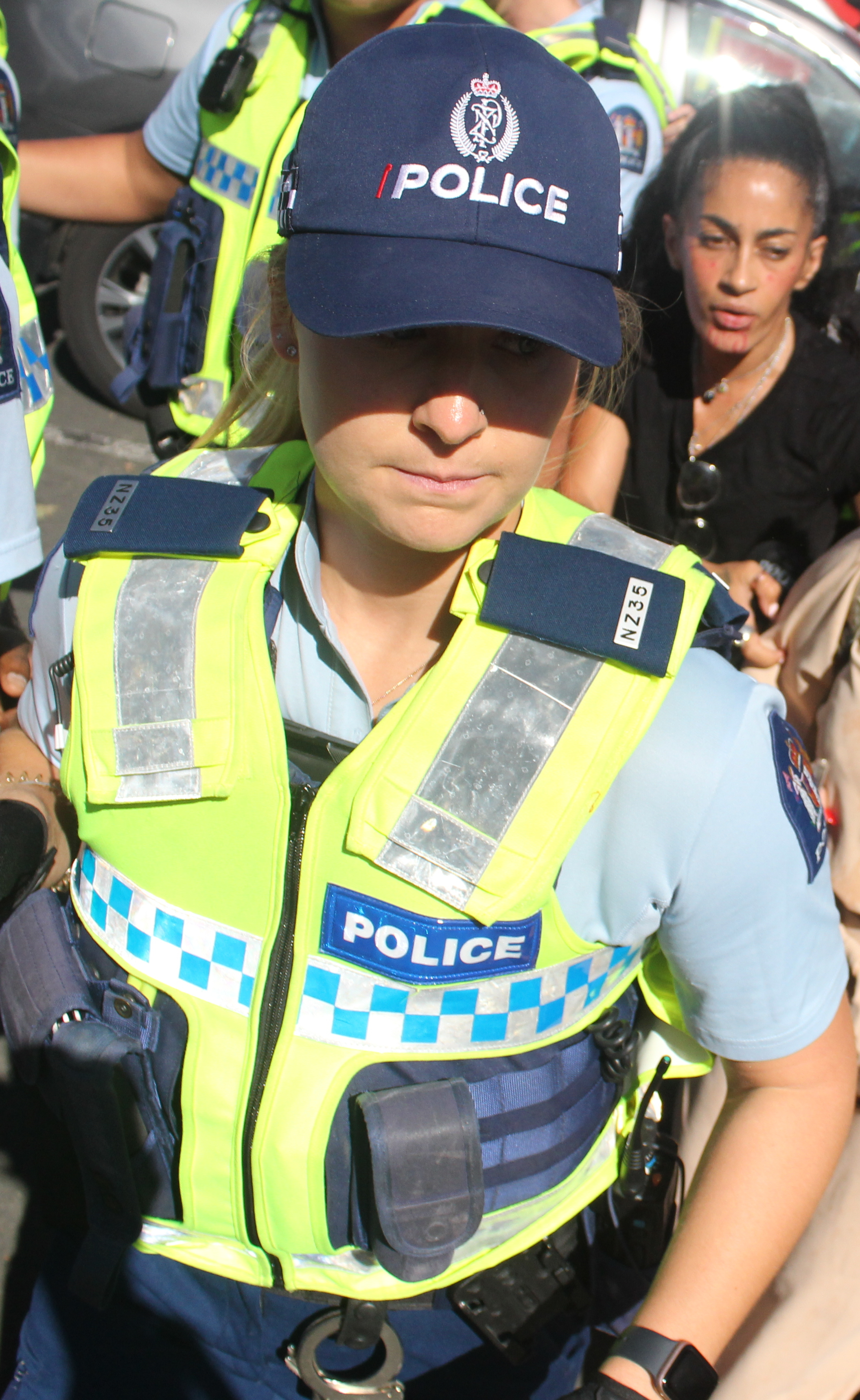
The epaulette worn by constables and sergeants of the New Zealand Police show their registered number.

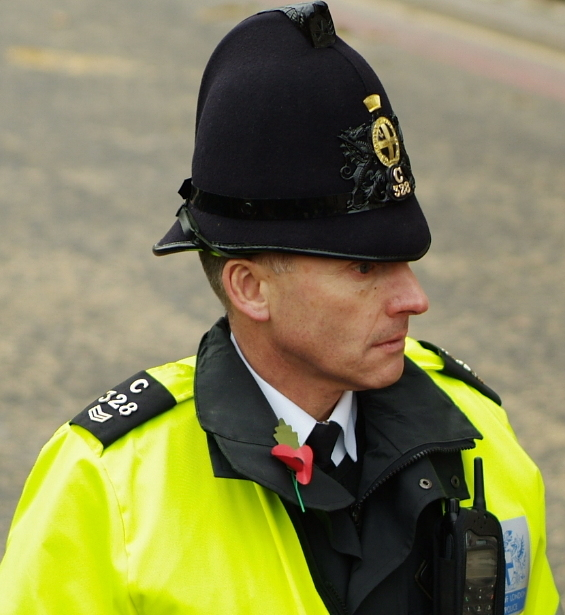
A City of London sergeant with collar number visible on epaulette.

A collar number, also known as a shoulder number, force identification number (FIN) or occasionally as force number (although this can also refer to the ID number of a force itself), identifies police officers, police community support officers (PCSO), special constables (SC or SPC) and some police staff in UK police forces – other law enforcement agencies, such as HM Prison Service, have also adopted identification numbers. Although now displayed on epaulettes (i.e. on the shoulder), it is still commonly referred to as a collar number. Although most forces issue a collar number to all warranted officers regardless of role, only uniformed officers of the ranks constable and sergeant actually display the numbers.

In most forces it is simply a one- to five-digit number, but in larger forces a letter code (also known as a division call sign) may be added to indicate the officer's base area or unit. In some forces different types of staff (paid ('regular') police officers, special constables, PCSOs and other police staff) are assigned different ranges of numbers, so a person's role can be deduced from the number, but these systems are force specific and there is no national standard.

== France ==
In France, the wearing of the collar number is compulsory, save a few exceptions, from 1 January 2014.

== Ireland ==
Uniformed members of the Garda Síochána wear an epaulette, bearing their unique "shoulder number". In the Dublin Metropolitan Region the shoulder number starts with the letter of the district, while in the rest of the country, shoulder numbers begin with the letters of the division. For film and TV, prop uniforms bare the letters "TF" followed by a number, with the exception of the TV show Red Rock, where uniforms had the fictional Dublin "V" district letter.

== New Zealand ==
Uniformed constables and sergeants of the New Zealand Police wear an epaulette, bearing their unique "registered number".

== United Kingdom ==
=== City of London ===
Until recently, collar numbers consisted of a number followed by a single letter to indicate the division (e.g. "PC 123A").

In 1914, the force was reorganised into four divisions, each named after its police station:

Divisional letter	Division
A	Moor Lane
B	Snow Hill
C	Bishopsgate
D	Cloak Lane

Moor Lane Police Station was destroyed in the Blitz in 1940, and A Division was abolished and distributed amongst the three remaining divisions. Cloak Lane Police Station was closed down in 1946, and D Division was transferred to the new Wood Street Police Station. The divisions after 1946 therefore stood at:

Divisional letter	Division
B	Snow Hill
C	Bishopsgate
D	Wood Street

In 1984, the force was reduced to two territorial divisions, based at Snow Hill Police Station and Bishopsgate Police Station (still B and C Divisions), together with support divisions, and the divisions subsequently stood at:

Divisional letter	Division
A	Anti-Terrorism & Public Order
B	Snow Hill
C	Bishopsgate
D	Specialist Crime Operations
E	Professional Development Unit
F	Economic Crime Department

In February 2009, all the divisions were abolished and the force was divided into directorates (with all patrol officers falling within the new Territorial Policing Directorate, subsequently incorporating certain specialist units and becoming the Uniformed Policing Directorate). All officers' collar numbers were then suffixed by the letters "CP" rather than a divisional letter. In a fashion similar to the Metropolitan police, some units such as Traffic and the Support Group, have their collar number supplemented by either the T or U respectively in order to differentiate their additional training and skill set.

Collar numbers are allocated as follows:

Range	Officers
1–149	Sergeants
150–999	Constables
1000–1099	Special Sergeants
1100–1299	Special Constables
2000–2099	PCSOs

=== Metropolitan Police ===
A number, followed by one or two letters indicating the station/sector, borough, or unit. Current practice favours use of borough codes rather than station codes (with the borough code generally taken from one of the borough's stations—see below—which can cause confusion).

Divisional area codes are still used to identify the areas themselves, together with the police station and vehicles (if any) nominally covering them, but not officers.

A one, two or three digit number denotes a Sergeant, a three or four digit number denotes a Constable, a four digit number beginning with 5 denotes an officer of the Metropolitan Special Constabulary, unless they're attached to a 'Roads & Transport Policing Command' (RTPC) team, in which case the number will begin with an 8 and a four digit number beginning with 7 denotes a PCSO again unless they are attached to RTPC and they will start with a 6. Confusingly, MPS epaulettes display the letters over the digits, i.e. 81FH (a Sergeant based at Hammersmith) would show FH over 81 on their shoulder, which reads more like FH81 (the call sign of a panda car based there). Ranks above Sergeant do not have collar numbers – officers are identified by name (e.g. Inspector Smith, who may once have been PC 123 kg Smith), or warrant number.

An exception to the above was the City of Westminster borough. Westminster had over 1,500 officers therefore a three digit number system was too small. Until late 2009 constables and sergeants had four digit shoulder numbers beginning 1, 2, 3 or 4 (with the leading number signifying which part of the borough you were attached to – 1 Westminster North, 2 Westminster Central, 3 Westminster South or 4 Westminster HQ). With the amalgamation of Westminster Central and South in late 2009 the decision was taken to amalgamate all the shoulder numbers into one numbering system. All new officers joining the borough were given the first available number and cross division moves no longer resulted in the need for a new shoulder number.

==== Central and Specialist Units ====
Code	Specialist unit
CC	Central Communications Command (MO12)
CJ	Met Detention (Custody)
CO	Specialist Crime & Operations (includes Specialist Firearms Command, Mounted Branch, Marine Policing Unit Interceptor Teams etc.)
FRT	Forensic Retrieval Team
R	Royalty Protection Group (SO14)
RO	Royal Parks Operational Command Unit
MF	Specialist Crime Directorate
SO	Specialist Operations & Aviation Security SO18 (Heathrow Airport & London City Airport)
V	Vehicle Recovery Examination Services (VRES)
VF	Violent Crime Task Force (VCTF)
VE	Operation Venice
P	Units based at Parliament (Parliamentary and Diplomatic Protection)
L	Learning Directorate (Training)
TP	Frontline Policing Headquarters
T	Roads and Transport Policing Command – Merger of ST (Safer Transport) and TD (Traffic)
U	Territorial Support Group (MO7)

==== Frontline Policing ====
From 2017 to 2019 the Metropolitan Police Service reformed the organisational structure of Frontline Policing from the existing 32 Borough Operational Command Units (BOCUs) into 12 new Basic Command Units.

Basic Command Unit	Sectors (Former BOCUs)	Station Codes
CN Central North	EK Camden	EO Holborn EK Kentish Town EW West Hampstead
CN Central North	NI Islington	NV Highbury Vale (closed), NH Holloway (closed), NI Islington
CE Central East	GD Hackney	GH Hackney (closed), GD Shoreditch, GN Stoke Newington
CE Central East	HT Tower Hamlets	HW Bow, HT Bethnal Green / Whitechapel, HR Brick Lane, HI Isle of Dogs (closed), HH Limehouse, HP Poplar
AS Central South	LX Lambeth	LD Brixton, LC Cavendish (closed), LN/LM† Clapham (closed), LG Gipsy Hill, LK Kennington, LS Streatham (closed)
AS Central South	MD Southwark	MC Camberwell (closed), MM Peckham, MR Rotherhithe (closed), MD Southwark, MS Walworth
AW Central West	BS Kensington & Chelsea	BC Chelsea (closed), BD Kensington, BH Notting Hill (closed), BN Notting Dale (closed)
AW Central West	CW Westminster	AD Belgravia (closed), CX Charing Cross, DP Paddington (closed), CD West End Central (closed), DM Marylebone (closed), DR Harrow Road (closed), DS St John's Wood (closed)
AW Central West	FH Hammersmith & Fulham	FF Fulham (closed), FH Hammersmith, FS Shepherds Bush (closed)
NA North Area	YE Enfield	YE Edmonton, YF Enfield North Cluster (closed), YB Enfield Patrol Base, YS Southgate West Cluster (closed), YP Edmonton South Cluster (Formerly Ponders end Cluster)
NA North Area	YR Haringey	YR Hornsey (closed), YM Muswell Hill (closed), YDQ Quicksilver Patrol Base, YA St Ann's (closed), YT Tottenham, YD Wood Green
NE North East	JC Waltham Forest	JC Chingford, JL Leyton (closed), JS Leytonstone (closed), JW Walthamstow (closed), JK Walthamstow Market, JP Leyton Custody Centre, JA Waltham Abbey (closed, now in Essex)
NE North East	KF Newham	KE East Ham (closed), KF Forest Gate, KN North Woolwich, KO Plaistow, KS Stratford (closed)
EA East Area	JI Redbridge	JB Barkingside, JI Ilford, JN Wanstead, JF Woodford
EA East Area	KD Havering	KL Collier Row, KA Harold Hill, KC Hornchurch, KM Rainham, KD Romford, KU Upminster, KH Harold Hill Patrol Base
EA East Area	KG Barking & Dagenham	KB Barking, KG Dagenham, KK Marks Gate, KW Freshwharf,
SE South East	PL Lewisham	PK Brockley (closed), PD Catford, PP Deptford, PL Lewisham, PS Sydenham (closed)
SE South East	RG Greenwich	RM Eltham (closed), RG Greenwich (closed), RA Plumstead, RT Thamesmead (closed), RK Westcombe Park (closed), RW Woolwich (closed), RH Shooters Hill (closed)
SE South East	RY Bexley	RB Belvedere (closed), RY Bexleyheath, RS Sidcup (closed)
SN South Area	PY Bromley	PB Beckenham (closed), PH Biggin Hill (closed), PC Chislehurst (closed), PY Bromley, PN Orpington (closed), PG Penge, PW West Wickham
SN South Area	ZD Croydon	ZD Croydon, ZN South Norwood (closed), ZY Norbury (closed), ZK Kenley (closed), ZA Addington, ZC Windmill Road Custody
SN South Area	ZT Sutton	ZT Sutton, ZW Wallington (closed), ZR Worcester Park (closed), ZB Banstead (Obsolete, previously Metropolitan Police now within Surrey Police Jurisdiction)
SW South West	TW Richmond Upon Thames	TR Richmond, TT Teddington (closed), TW Twickenham
SW South West	VK Kingston upon Thames	VK Kingston, VN New Malden, VS Surbiton, VE Esher (Obsolete, previously Metropolitan Police now within Surrey Police Jurisdiction)
SW South West	VW Merton	VM Mitcham, VR Morden (closed), VW Wimbledon
SW South West	WW Wandsworth	WA Battersea (closed), WL Lavender Hill, WD Tooting (closed), WF Earlsfield (closed), WH Wandsworth (includes the Putney Sector Office which replaced the previous Putney station which had the code WP)
WA West Area	TX Hounslow	TB Brentford, TC Chiswick, TF Feltham, TD Hounslow
WA West Area	XB Ealing	XA Acton, XD Ealing, XS Southall, XG Greenford, XN Norwood Green, XI Hanwell
WA West Area	XH Hillingdon	XF Harefield, XY Hayes, XU Uxbridge, XN Northwood, XR Ruislip, XE West Drayton
NW North West	SX Barnet	SA Barnet (closed), SC Colindale, SF Finchley (closed), SG Golders Green (closed), ST Whetstone (closed)
NW North West	QA Harrow	QE Edgware (closed), QA Harrow, QP Pinner, QW Wealdstone (closed), QS West Street (closed)
NW North West	QK Brent	QC Chalkhill (closed), QH Harlesden (closed), QK Kilburn, QD Wembley, QL Willesden Green (closed), QY Kingsbury (closed)

† Some authoritative sources (e.g. Police and Constabulary Almanac) are self-contradictory and incomplete.

Not all of these stations are currently operational.

Further to this; letters on shoulders will denote borough or newly formed basic command units and not the police station an officer is based from. An example of this would be a PC working from East Ham Police Station in the borough of Newham; the PC would have KF (Newham) on their shoulder and not KE (East Ham station). Similarly in newly merged boroughs a PC working from Holloway Police Station would have CN (Central North BCU) on their shoulder.

=== Sussex Police ===
All officers will be provided with a collar number which is also their warrant number. Prior to September 2018, this was deemed by gender for example CS123 would represent a male officer whose surname started with S, a female would being with a D, DS123 for example.

The second letter would be the first initial of the officer, followed by a three digit number. In September 2018, this changed and all new officers warrant numbers start EA followed by a three digit number. Following the full use of the EA numbers from 1–999, they now start EB.

=== PNC codes and collar numbers ===
When a police officer or a member of staff is in a collaborative (multi-constabulary) unit or department (such as the Bedfordshire, Cambridgeshire and Hertfordshire Road Policing Unit), the PNC code, which is a force identification number, is added to the collar number to prevent confusion between officers; e.g., 41-9999 would indicate a Hertfordshire officer. These numbers are only used in paperwork and are not seen on the officer's epaulettes.

=== HM Prison Service ===
Operational Support Staff and sworn Prison Officers in His Majesty's Prison Service bear collar numbers to aid in accountability in the service. Collar numbers bear two letters indicating which establishment the officer is based at and three random numerical digits.

=== In fiction ===
The collar number of George Dixon of Dixon of Dock Green was O 706.
