= Coppers (British TV series) =

- Genre: Documentary
- Directed by: Anthony Philipson
- Narrated by: Paul Thornley
- Country of origin: United Kingdom
- Original language: English
- No. of seasons: 2
- No. of episodes: 13

Production
- Executive producer: Simon Ford
- Producer: Ben Rumney
- Editor: Mark Towns
- Running time: 60 minutes
- Production company: Blast! Films

Original release
- Network: Channel 4
- Release: 1 November 2010 – 27 February 2012

Coppers is a British fly-on-the-wall documentary television series broadcast on Channel 4, about policing in the United Kingdom. First broadcast on 1 November 2010, the series followed the day-to-day lives of police officers (colloquially known as 'coppers') from four territorial police forces around the country, covering various activities: custody suite operations, road unit policing, 999 response, night time policing and riot control.

A second and final series began on 9 January 2012 and ran for 8 episodes.

== Concept ==
The premise of the series was presented by the producers as follows:

As police budgets, and numbers, come under threat, this hard-hitting series reveals what police officers across Britain really think about being on the frontline of 21st-century Britain

This referred to the impending cuts in police force budgets as a result of the 2010 Spending Review, the results of which were announced in October 2010, just before the show aired.

The series follows a reality television documentary style. Each episode features only a small amount of narration, and the majority of screen time is devoted to on location filming with interaction to camera from the police officers being filmed. This is supplemented with footage of officers talking to camera in a more formal setting, with minimal input by an interviewer. At the end of each episode, there is a summary of the outcome of the cases of many of the police officers and offenders featured.

== Broadcast ==
The first series was broadcast as five one-hour episodes on Channel 4 on Monday nights in the 9 pm timeslot. The second and final series was broadcast as eight one-hour episodes on Channel 4 on Monday nights in the 9 pm timeslot.

== Episodes ==
=== Series 1 (2010) ===
| No. overall | No. in series | Title | Force | Original release date |
|---|---|---|---|---|
| 1 | 1 | "Custody" | Kent Police | 1 November 2010 |
Episode one is centred on the Medway custody suite and custody sergeant of Gillingham police station, detailing the treatment of offenders in custody, and the criminal histories of many of the people processed.
| 2 | 2 | "Traffic" | Cambridgeshire Constabulary | 8 November 2010 |
Episode two follows the activity of the traffic division of the Cambridge force, specifically a two man crew driving one of their Volvo V70 traffic cars as they attend incidents on the motorway and in urban settings.
| 3 | 3 | "Emergency Response" | Kent Police | 15 November 2010 |
Episode three focuses on the 999 emergency telephone calls received by the Kent force's communications centre, detailing many of the time-wasting and inappropriate calls received, and following the officers responding to many of the real emergency calls.
| 4 | 4 | "Saturday Night" | West Yorkshire Police | 22 November 2010 |
Episode four follows the officers on foot who police the city centres Wakefield and Leeds at night, focussing on the problems and issues caused by excessive drinking.
| 5 | 5 | "Public Order" | Greater Manchester Police | 29 November 2010 |
Episode five examines the policing by the Greater Manchester force's Tactical Aid Unit during a riot between supporters of the English Defence League and Unite Against Fascism, sparked by an EDL march through Bolton town centre.

=== Series 2 (2012) ===
| No. overall | No. in series | Title | Force | Original release date |
|---|---|---|---|---|
| 6 | 1 | "CID" | Nottinghamshire Police | 9 January 2012 |
Episode one is centred on Detectives from Mansfield CID and are struggling with a burglary epidemic, with over 6000 homes in Nottingham targeted in 2011. Meanwhile officers launch a manhunt that ends with the discovery of a dead body in a wood, and arrest a convicted child sex offender after the attempted rape of a young boy.
| 7 | 2 | "Public Order" | Nottinghamshire Police | 16 January 2012 |
Episode two examines the shocking scenes as Nottingham's frontline officers find themselves in the middle of some of the worst anti-police violence in a generation, with police cars and police stations under sustained attack from bricks and petrol bombs.
| 8 | 3 | "Beat Officers" | Nottinghamshire Police | 23 January 2012 |
Episode three examines the work of "beat bobbies" tackling shoplifters, burglars, drunks and anti-social behaviour in Nottinghamshire.
| 9 | 4 | "Newest Recruits" | Tayside Police | 30 January 2012 |
Episode four examines the work of Tayside police's newest officers as they hit the streets for the first time, witnessing their first arrest, drugs raid and sudden death.
| 10 | 5 | "Armed Support" | Nottinghamshire Police | 6 February 2012 |
Episode five describes the pressures of armed police officers carrying guns on the nation's streets, and defend the use of Tasers as a vital tool on the front line of the fight against crime.
| 11 | 6 | "Territorial Support Group" | Nottinghamshire Police | 13 February 2012 |
Episode six follows members of the Territorial Support Group (TSG), specialising in the handling of public order incidents, including football violence, demonstrations and anti-social behaviour. Working out of a van that serves as their office, canteen, home and cell.
| 13 | 8 | "Rural Policing" | Tayside Police | 27 February 2012 |
Episode eight describes how officers work in such a vast yet sparsely populated area, where traffic accidents are the main concern.
