= Violence Suppression Unit =

High risk policing unit of the Metropolitan Police Service

Metropolitan Police Service Violence Suppression Unit
- Abbreviation: VSU

Jurisdictional structure
- Operations jurisdiction: United Kingdom
- Map of current operating area
- General nature: Civilian police

Operational structure
- Parent agency: Metropolitan Police Service

The Violence Suppression Unit (VSU) was a type of unit of the Frontline Policing Directorate, formerly known as Territorial Policing, which is part of London's Metropolitan Police Service (MPS). Its role was to combat street crime, violence, and knife offences, as well as track down high-harm fugitives.

The VSUs were created in 2020 to amalgamate the previous Borough Crime Squads under one umbrella. The introduction of the units had led to more than 6,000 arrests, over 1,000 weapons confiscated, and more than £1 million seized since inception. VSUs were closed in January 2024 and amalgamated into what is now BCU Proactive teams.

Each of the 12 Basic Command Units (BCUs) had a VSU which patrols in plain clothes and unmarked vehicles as well as in marked police vans or carriers. Each VSU had approximately 50 officers, predominantly police constables despite being a part of the Criminal Investigation Department (CID).

Officers attached to a VSU tended to be experienced officers who are trained in police driving, public order and both the covert and overt carriage of tasers.

== History ==
In the years prior to the creation of the VSUs, homicide rates in London had been on the rise; leading to a ten year high in 2019. In response to a continued increase in street violence, the Metropolitan Police Service implemented the VSUs by consolidating and expanding already existing teams throughout the force. Police-recorded violence against the person also rose sharply during this period, a trend confirmed in a 2020 analysis by the Behavioural Insights Team for the London Violence Reduction Unit.

By mid-2018, the Metropolitan Police publicly described the increase in serious violence as “deeply troubling,” noting more than sixty murder investigations opened by May of that year. The official establishment of the Violence Suppression Units took place in March 2020, according to a Metropolitan Police FOI disclosure, which also documented their initial staffing structure across Basic Command Units.

A review by the London Assembly’s Police and Crime Committee later noted that the launch of the VSUs formed part of a wider violence-reduction strategy combining enforcement with prevention programmes delivered by the Violence Reduction Unit and partner organisations.

Civil-society organisations also raised concerns about the potential impacts of enforcement-led policing on particular communities, situating the creation of the VSUs within a broader debate about specialist police units and stop-and-search practices in London.

== Objectives ==
The VSUs were tasked with increasing the overall safety of the areas to which they are stationed. Their primary focus was on making high-risk and high-harm arrests, patrolling in high crime activity areas, mobilising in high violence areas, projecting a large command presence in hot spot areas. The latter was accomplished using large numbers of uniformed constables and marked vehicles.

Unit assignments as a whole included supporting of commanders in coordinating pan-London activities, making high-risk and high-harm arrests, executing manhunts for high-risk suspects, executing search warrants, responding to crimes in progress, and targeted enforcement against high-risk offenders.

== Organisation ==
The VSUs were split into teams, with each team comprising two elements: a proactive element (crime squad), and a visible element. Having the teams split into these elements provided the unit with a high level of flexibility, as well as provide the constables involved with opportunities to develop more diverse skillsets.

=== Proactive element ===
The proactive element of the VSU was tasked with handling the majority of high-risk suspects, being tasked with targeting repeat offenders that are particularly dangerous (e.g. involved in or suspected of knife possession, robbery, drug trafficking). According to an MSP disclosure, the unit is "able to look at and break down the wider circle of associates linked to individuals and undertake proactive targeting to reduce violence and as needed, refer individuals into supporting diversion schemes." Most of this was transferred to BCU Proactive teams.

=== Visible element ===
The visible element of the VSU was responsible for the visibility of the team in high crime areas, and is used to support the proactive element during arrest phases.

== Equipment and vehicles ==
Each VSU should have been equipped with at least two high visibility marked police minibuses, and at least 3 "Q" unmarked covert cars, all with response capabilities. They also had shared access to protected police vans and personnel carriers.

Like all front-line MSP officers, VSU officers were equipped with speedcuffs, collapsible batons, and tear gas containing CS or PAVA. They also had the capability to carry the X2 Taser. All unit officers were expected to be trained in Level 2 Public Order (riot training) and rapid entry.

Individual BCUs may have chosen to equip their VSU officers with other equipment such as a kit for specialist entry and tyre deflation devices such as spike strips. Some VSU teams trialled fitting a dog cage within the unit's unmarked vehicles. This can be utilised with a dedicated Police Dog Handler to assist the unit when required.

== Recruitment ==
Officers wanting to join a VSU were selected from BCU officers by a submission of interest supported by a line manager. There may be an interview process and desirable attributes include experience in proactive policing, an understanding of the Regulation of Investigatory Powers Act, understanding manhunts and fugitive hunting, being trained in Level 2 Public Order and rapid entry, being trained in the use of tasers, covert or standard, and being an advanced or response police driver. During the initial phase of recruitment, officers from anywhere in the MPS could apply to address a shortage of volunteers from some BCUs. As of November 2020, the initial phase has ended and applicants can only transfer from within the same BCU.

== Criticism ==
Similar to the Territorial Support Groups and their predecessors, the Special Patrol Groups, the VSUs have been criticised for racial profiling and the use of stop and search. After the conception of the VSUs, stop and search actions had increased by 8%. The VSU was predicted to be racially disproportionate prior to its conception and the MSP considered whether it would go ahead.

The VSUs had also been likened to the units of the same name founded in California. The Merced Police Department (PD) established a gang VSU in 1994, the Salinas PD founded its VSU in 1995, and Concord PD's VSU dates back to 2015. These have been criticised for their aggressive patrol strategies.

== Leadership ==
The VSU was part of the Frontline Policing Directorate and as such is led by the senior leadership team of the BCU. The VSU teams would have been run by a police sergeant and a detective or police inspector under the CID.

== See also ==
- Organisation and structure of the Metropolitan Police
