= Specialist, Organised & Economic Crime Command =

The Specialist, Organised & Economic Crime Command was a unit within the Gangs and Organised Crime group of the Frontline Policing command within London's Metropolitan Police Service. As of 2018, the unit's operations now form part of Met Operations and frontline policing units.

The unit's main responsibility was to both investigate and take steps to prevent fraud, along with a wide range of other fraudulent crimes requiring specialist knowledge and training to investigate. The unit had previously been known as the fraud squad, or by its previous Specialist Operations designation, SO6.

== History ==
Formed in 1946 as the Metropolitan and City Police Fraud Department or "C6 Branch", it was the first integrated cross-border, co-operative unit set up jointly between London's two police services; the City of London Police, due to their expertise in business and stock market fraud, and the Metropolitan Police with their investigative experience.

The increasing complexity of business fraud, and with it the lessening chances of securing successful prosecutions, saw the implementation of the Serious Fraud Office in 1987. This made C6 obsolete, and the City of London Police and the Metropolitan Police reverted to having their own Fraud Squads.

The MPS was then called SO6. Staffed by about 140 detectives, specialised teams within the Squad included the Commercial Crimes Intelligence Bureau, a Financial Investigations Unit, the Fraud Prevention Office, a Surveillance Unit, a Crime Management Unit and a fledgling Computer Crime Unit.

In October 2000, the Fraud Squad was renamed Economic and Specialist Crime under the Assistant Commissioner for Crime and Intelligence, moving to the Specialist Crime Directorate on the latter's formation in 2002. Its remit was also expanded substantially to cover a wider range of financial and economic crime and fraud. Several other autonomous units, such as the Arts and Antiquities Squad, were merged into the new unit.

The Proactive Money Laundering Investigation Team, formed in 2003, had a remit to deal with high-level money laundering, and were are active in removing substantial amounts of criminal cash from the organised criminal networks working in and around London.

The Specialist Crime Directorate was merged with Central Operations to create Specialist Crime & Operations, which split again in 2018. Operations is now part of Met Operations, and Specialist Crime part of Frontline Policing Headquarters within Frontline Policing.

== Structure ==
The Specialist, Organised & Economic Crime Command was made up of several teams and sub-units:

- Art and Antiques Unit
- The Branch Intelligence Unit
- The Criminal Finance Team (CFT)
- The Dedicated Cheque and Plastic Crime Unit
- The Extradition and International Assistance Units
- The Financial Investigation Development Unit
- The Flying Squad
- The Fraud Squads
- Project Genesius
- The Kidnap Unit
- The London Regional Asset Recovery Team (London RART)
- Operation Maxim
- Middle Market Drugs Partnership
- Operation Nexus
- The Police Central e-crime Unit (PCeU)
- The Proactive Money Laundering Taskforce (PMLT)
- The Projects Team
- Operation Sterling
- The Stolen Vehicle Unit (SVU)
- The Trafficking and Prostitution Unit
- The Special Intelligence Section (SIS)

== See also ==
- Serious Organised Crime Agency
- Specialist Crime Directorate
