= Traffic Operational Command Unit =

Road policing unit in Greater London

The Traffic Operational Command Unit (OCU), formally known as CO15, was the Road Policing Unit for the Metropolitan Police Service in Greater London, England.

On 1 December 2014, Traffic OCU was merged with the Safer Transport Command (STC), to create the new Roads and Transport Policing Command (RTPC) under the heading of MO8 (Met Operations: Section 8).

== Role, responsibilities and aims ==
Traffic OCU's patrol officers are highly trained advanced (pursuit) drivers, motorcyclists and vehicle examiners. All receive additional training in accident investigation with many being trained to advanced levels in forensic collision reconstruction, vehicle examination, tachograph analysis and hazardous materials enforcement. They have responsibility for the enforcement of road safety legislation, response to major incidents and incidents on motorways and the strategic road network, the complete investigation of fatal collisions, and the initial investigation of life changing Road Traffic Collisions within the MPD.

Traffic OCU Sergeants (known colloquially as "Garage Sergeants") are also responsible for the investigation of all collisions involving police vehicles.

Traffic OCU's stated aims are to:

- Deny criminals use of the roads by enforcing the law
- Reduce road casualties
- Tackle the threat of terrorism
- Reduce anti-social use of the roads
- Enhance public confidence and reassurance by patrolling the roads
- Attend and investigate all fatal collisions

In addition to general police duties and patrol, Traffic OCU officers focus particularly on offences related to antisocial and criminal use of vehicles, driving under the influence of drink or drugs, excessive speed, dangerous and careless driving, defective vehicles, commercial vehicles and the transportation of hazardous materials, and disqualified, unlicensed or uninsured drivers.

Within Traffic OCU, the Serious Collision Investigation Unit (SCIU), staffed by detectives and expert collision investigators, is responsible for the investigation of all fatal collisions within the Metropolitan Police District. Whilst work continues to reduce the death toll, there are still in the region of 130 road traffic collision fatalities on London's roads each year - more than the number of murders.

== Locations ==
Traffic OCU has four operational bases known as "Traffic Garages".

=== East Garage (TDJ) ===
The East Garage is located in Chadwell Heath. The Metropolitan Police Service uses the code of TDJ to identify the location. The premises is shared with the Territorial Support Group and Dog Support Unit. Officers have the geographic responsibility for the boroughs of the Tower Hamlets, Newham, Barking and Dagenham, Hackney, Havering, Redbridge and Waltham Forest.

=== South Garage (TDP) ===
The South Garage is located in Catford. The Metropolitan Police Service uses the code of TDP to identify the location. The premises is shared with the Territorial Support Group and the Dog Section. Officers have the geographic responsibility for the boroughs of the Bexley, Greenwich, Lewisham, Southwark, London Borough of Lambeth, Bromley and Croydon.

=== West Garage (TDV) ===
The West area has one garage located on an industrial estate in Merton which is shared with the Dog Section. Metropolitan Police Service uses the code of TDV (for Merton). The geographic responsibilities of the garage is the London Boroughs of Hammersmith and Fulham, Wandsworth, Hounslow, Richmond Upon Thames, Kingston upon Thames, Merton, Sutton and Westminster. This is due to close in April 2027 and officers redeployed to Alperton or Catford. They will still be expected to cover SW London from these locations making the response times to calls within the area extended.

=== North Garage (TDQ) ===
The North Garage is located on an industrial estate in Alperton and the Metropolitan Police Service uses the code TDQ to identify the location. The premises is a shared base. The geographic responsibilities of the officers from this garage are the London Boroughs of Barnet, Brent, Camden, Ealing, Enfield, Haringey, Harrow, Hillingdon and Islington.

=== Former garages ===
Northolt (TDX), Barnes (TDB), Bermondsey (TDM), Bow (TDH), Croydon (TDZ), Euston (Firstly TDE, then TDC), Finchley (TDS), Eltham (TDR), Leyton-Rigg Approach (TDJ), Chadwell Heath (TDK), St Ann's Road (TDY), Hampton (TDT), Merton (TDV) april 27

== Staffing ==
Traffic Operational Command Unit had 622 Police Officers of which 523 are based at the four traffic bases across London with the remainder at Headquarters and other smaller specialist units and over 130 civilian Police Support Staff employed within the department along with a small number of Special Constables. The Police Officers and Special Constables from the command could be easily recognized by their shoulder numbers beginning with the letter 'T', with qualified traffic officers bearing white covers worn over their uniform caps.

- 139 were based at the North East Traffic Base (Chadwell Heath)
- 125 were based at the South East London Traffic Base (Catford)
- 117 were based at the North West London Traffic Base (Alperton)
- 142 were based at the South West London Traffic Base (Merton)

== Equipment and vehicles ==
Traffic OCU officers patrol both in cars and on motorcycles.

Cars used are the BMW 5 Series 530d X-Drive tourer, Volvo V90, BMW X3 4x4 and Skoda Superb estates. The command has previously used BMW X5 4x4, Mitsubishi Shogun 4x4 and Ford Mondeo Estate. Each vehicle is fitted with a mobile data terminal with access to the Police National Computer, Automatic Number Plate Recognition and video systems.

The current solo motorcycle used is the BMW 1200RT-P although some older 1150cc and 650cc models remain. The command also utilises some BMW 750GS. Although motorcycles carry less equipment than cars, they are far more agile through traffic congestion and are essential for escorting convoys, processions and demonstrations.
