= VSU =

VSU is an abbreviation that (among other things) can stand for:

- Valdosta State University, a university in Valdosta, Georgia, United States
- Venstresocialisternes Ungdom, a former youth wing of the Danish political party Venstresocialisterne
- Vikrama Simhapuri University, a university in the Nellore district of Andhra Pradesh, India
- Violence Suppression Unit, a type of unit of the London-based Metropolitan Police Service's Frontline Policing Directorate
- Virginia State University, a historically Black university in Ettrick, Virginia, United States
- Visayas State University, a university in Baybay, Leyte, Philippines
- Voluntary student unionism, a membership policy used by university student organisations
- Voronezh State University, a university in Voronezh, Voronezh Oblast, Russia
