= Louisa Rolfe =

British police officer

Louisa Rolfe OBE

Assistant Commissioner Frontline Policing Metropolitan Police Service
- In office 2022–2024
- Preceded by: Nick Ephgrave
- Succeeded by: Matt Twist

Assistant Commissioner Met Operations Metropolitan Police Service
- In office September 2020 – 2022
- Preceded by: Nick Ephgrave
- Succeeded by: Matt Twist

Personal details
- Born: Louisa Helen Rolfe; November 1969 (age 56)
- Profession: Police officer

Louisa Rolfe (born November 1969) is a senior British police officer. She served as Assistant Commissioner for Met Operations in the Metropolitan Police from 2020 to 2022, and at the same rank for Frontline Policing from 2022 to 2024. She was Deputy Chief Constable of West Midlands Police from 2016 to 2020.

== Life ==
She began her police career at Avon and Somerset Police, where she spent 25 years, becoming its head of the CID developing specialist units in organised crime and counter-terrorism intelligence for south-west England alongside multi-service teams for crime investigation, roads policing, dogs and firearms. She moved to West Midlands Police in December 2016 on her appointment as its Deputy Chief Constable. There, she led on diversity and domestic abuse, becoming lead on the latter for the National Police Chiefs' Council. On 8 April 2020, it was announced that she would move to the Metropolitan Police Service, becoming Assistant Commissioner for Met Operations, assuming the post in August that year. In late September 2022, it was announced that she would move to Frontline Policing, being succeeded in Met Operations by Matt Twist.

== Honours ==
Rolfe was appointed an Officer of the Order of the British Empire in the 2019 New Year Honours for services to policing. She is also currently a trustee of charity Police Now.

Ribbon	Description	Notes
	Officer of the Most Excellent Order of the British Empire (OBE)	2019
	Queen Elizabeth II Golden Jubilee Medal	2002
	Queen Elizabeth II Diamond Jubilee Medal	2012
	Queen Elizabeth II Platinum Jubilee Medal	2022
	King Charles III Coronation Medal	2023
	Police Long Service and Good Conduct Medal	
