= RTPC =

RTPC might refer to:

- a radial time projection chamber
- the Roads and Transport Policing Command of London, United Kingdom
