= Hollaback =

Hollaback or holla back may refer to:

- "Hollaback Girl", a 2005 single by Gwen Stefani
- Hollaback!, former name of Right To Be, an online organization formed to combat harassment
