= Art and Antiques Unit =

Specialist branch of London's Metropolitan Police

The Metropolitan Police Art and Antiques Unit is a branch of the Specialist, Organised & Economic Crime Command within London's Metropolitan Police Service. The unit's purpose is to investigate art theft, illegal trafficking and fraud. The UK art market is the second largest in the world. As of April 2022, the unit consisted of one Detective Sergeant, three Detective Constables and one civilian member of staff.

== Formation and history ==
The Art and Antiques Unit was established in 1969. It was dissolved and reformed in the mid-1980s, a second time after the 2005 London Bombings and again following the Grenfell Tower fire in 2017.

The unit maintains the London Stolen Arts Database (LSAD), containing details of thousands of items of stolen cultural property. The unit has a strength of six officers – led by a Detective Chief Inspector, with a Detective Inspector, Detective Sergeant and three Detective Constables. In contrast, the Italian Carabinieri Art Squad employs around 300 detectives.

== Notable investigations ==
The unit's work led to the successful prosecution of Jonathan Tokeley-Parry in 1997 for smuggling Egyptian antiquities. In 2007, the forger Shaun Greenhalgh was sentenced to more than four years in prison.

In 2019, artefacts seized by the unit in 2002 were repatriated to Afghanistan.

== See also ==
- Carabinieri Art Squad
- Art theft
