= Organisation and structure of the Metropolitan Police =

Organisation of English security forces

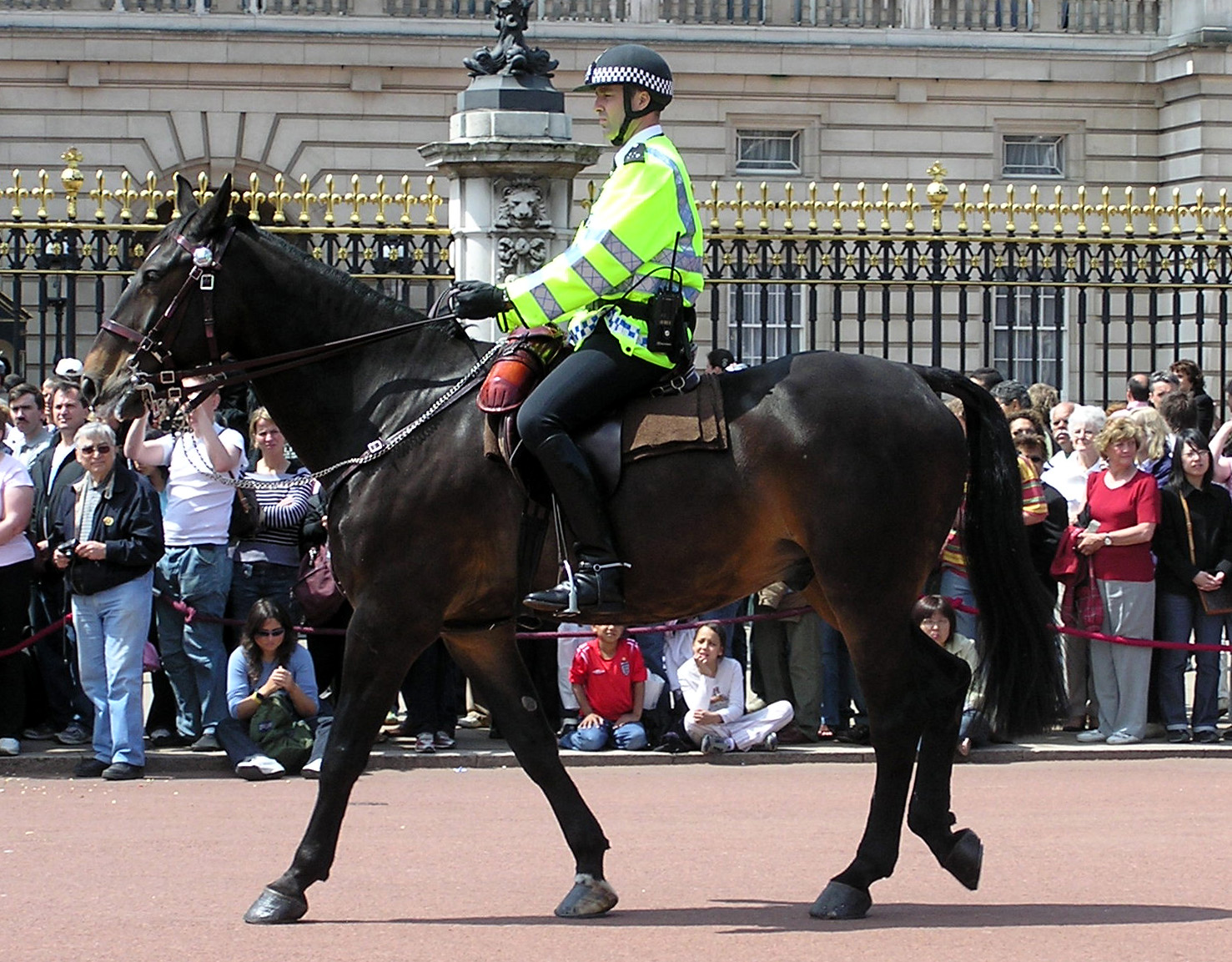
Mounted MPS officer outside Buckingham Palace, London

The Metropolitan Police of Greater London, England is organised into five main directorates, each headed by an Assistant Commissioner, and four civilian-staffed support departments previously under the umbrella of Met Headquarters, each headed by a Chief Officer, the equivalent civilian grade to Assistant Commissioner. Each business groups or directorate has differing responsibilities. The commands are Frontline Policing (formerly Territorial Policing), Met Operations (formerly Specialist Crime & Operations), Specialist Operations and Professionalism.

The management board, responsible for the strategic direction of the MPS, is composed of the senior police leadership including the Commissioner, Deputy Commissioner, at least four Assistant Commissioners (for Met Operations, Frontline Policing, Specialist Operations and Professionalism) and four Chief Officers.

== Leadership ==
As of September 2026, the senior leadership rank-holders of the MPS are:

- Commissioner Sir Mark Rowley
- Deputy Commissioner Matt Jukes
- Assistant Commissioners
  - Matt Twist (responsible for Frontline Policing)
  - Ade Adelekan (temporary, responsible for Met Operations)
  - Laurence Taylor (responsible for Specialist Operations)
  - Rachel Williams (responsible for Professionalism)
  - Sir Stephen Kavanagh (seconded to Interpol)
  - Pippa Mills (seconded to National Police Chiefs' Council)
  - Louisa Rolfe (seconded to National Police Chiefs' Council)
- Chief Officers
  - Business Services: Clare Davies
  - Communications and Engagement: Sharon Sawers
  - Digital and Innovation: Marie Heracleous
  - Finance: Adrian Wight (interim)
  - Strategy and Investment: TBA

The highest rank in the MPS is that of the Commissioner, the operational leader; however the MPS is accountable to the Mayor's Office for Policing and Crime on a pan-London basis and the Home Secretary on a national policing basis.

Appointments to the most senior ranks of assistant commissioner and above are made in consultation with the Mayor of London and the Home Secretary, with the appointment of the Deputy Commissioner and Commissioner being formally made by the monarch. Rebecca George and Brian Paddick were added as non-executive directors in October 2023.

== Frontline Policing ==
The Frontline Policing Directorate, formerly known as Territorial Policing, is commanded by Assistant Commissioner Matt Twist, who is responsible for providing the day-to-day local policing of Greater London (excluding the City of London), the police area defined in legislation as the Metropolitan Police District.

=== Basic Command Unit (BCU) ===
Historically the Metropolitan Police District's territory was divided into divisions grouped into districts and later divisions grouped into areas. In 2000 this was replaced by a system of one Borough Operational Command Unit (BOCU) for each of the 32 post-1965 London boroughs, each commanded by a chief superintendent. In early 2018, largely due to police funding constraints, it was announced that there would be a radical shake up of local policing in London to replace the BOCUs established in 2000. Over the following 12 months each of the 32 BOCUs would be merged with others to form 12 Basic Command Units (BCUs). This followed a trial of two 'pathfinder' BCUs, Central North BCU consisting of the old Islington and Camden BOCUs, and the East Area BCU consisting of the old Barking & Dagenham, Havering and Redbridge BOCUs.

Each BCU is provided with:

- Risk and Demand Team (RAD): Responsible for recording anti-social behaviour incidents, recording non-urgent reports, and liaises with other agencies.
- Safer Neighbourhood Teams (SNTs): Responsible for patrolling and dealing with long-term issues in each neighbourhood, or 'ward'. Investigates neighbour-related incidents and anti-social behaviour that reaches a threshold.
- Response Team: Responsible for patrolling and responding to calls for service and investigating volume crime.
- Local Investigations (LI): Responsible for investigating serious and complex investigations outside of the remit of Safer Neighbourhoods or Response. Also has an oversight for serious developing incidents, such as kidnaps, stabbings, and shootings.
- Public Protection: Responsible for investigating and prosecuting domestic abuse crimes.
- Child Abuse Investigation Team: Responsible for investigating crimes against minors where the suspect is a family member or in a position of power or responsibility, such as a teacher or child minder.

The 12 BCU structure consists of the following boroughs:

1. Central West BCU (AW) – Hammersmith and Fulham, Kensington and Chelsea, Westminster
2. South West BCU (SW) – Kingston, Merton, Richmond, Wandsworth
3. South BCU (SN) – Bromley, Croydon, Sutton
4. South East BCU (SE) – Bexley, Greenwich, Lewisham
5. East BCU (EA) – Barking and Dagenham, Havering, Redbridge
6. West BCU (WA) – Ealing, Hillingdon, Hounslow
7. Central South BCU (AS) – Lambeth, Southwark
8. North BCU (NA) – Enfield, Haringey
9. Central East BCU (CE) – Hackney, Tower Hamlets
10. Central North BCU (CN) – Camden, Islington
11. North West BCU (NW) – Barnet, Brent, Harrow
12. North East BCU (NE) – Newham, Waltham Forest

There has been significant concerns raised in various quarters over these changes.

=== Non-BCU Frontline Policing ===
As of February 2019 the non-BCU units within Frontline Policing were:

- Royal Parks Operational Command Unit
- Crime Recording Investigation Bureau (CRIB)
- Frontline Policing Headquarters
- Child Abuse and Sexual Offences Command
- Specialist Crime Command
- Online Child Sexual Exploitation
- Organised Crime
- Trident

== Met Operations ==
Met Operations or Met Ops is one of the eight business groups which forms the Metropolitan Police Service. It was created during the 2018–19 restructuring of the service, amalgamating much of its functions from the previous Specialist Crime & Operations Directorate. As of June 2026, the group is led by Acting Assistant Commissioner Ade Adelekan.

It consists of several branches:

- Met Ops Chief Officer Team (MO1)
- Met Intelligence (MO2)
- Covert Policing (MO3)
- Forensic Services (MO4)
- Covert Governance (MO5)
- Public Order Planning (MO6)
- Taskforce (MO7) (Note: Consisting of Territorial Support Group, the Marine Policing Unit, the Dog Support Unit and Mounted Branch)
- Roads and Transport Policing Command (MO8)
- Met Detention (MO9)
- Met Prosecutions (MO10)
- Operational Support Services (MO11)
- MetCC (MO12)
- Specialist Firearms Command (MO19 (Note: Internal)/SCO19 (Note: External)) (Note: Previously SO19 then CO19) (Note: Responsible for providing a firearms-response capability, assisting the rest of the MPS, which is normally unarmed.)

== Specialist Operations ==
Specialist Operations (SO) is a directorate of the Metropolitan Police Service, responsible for providing specialist policing capabilities. Until Sir Kenneth Newman's restructuring of the Metropolitan Police, SO comprised twenty units, but after the restructuring most of them were absorbed by Central Operations (now Met Operations).

SO is headed by an Assistant Commissioner (Laurence Taylor as of 2026), with two deputy assistant commissioners and three commanders.

SO is currently organised into three commands:

=== Protection Command ===
Headed by Commander Simon Messinger as of 2024, it is split into the following specialist operational areas:

- Parliamentary and Diplomatic Protection (PaDP)
- Royalty and Specialist Protection (RaSP)

=== Aviation and Protective Security ===
Security Command is headed by a Commander (as of 2024 Elisabeth Chapple as Acting Commander). The command comprises:

- Aviation Security Operational Unit (SO18)
- Protective Security Operations – ensures that there are adequate protective security arrangements in place for major events, crowded places, iconic sites and that key utilities and sites where hazardous substances are located are securely protected.

=== Counter Terrorism Command ===
Formed by the merger of Special Branch and the Anti-Terrorist Branch, it is headed as of 2024 by Commander Dom Murphy. The priority of this command is to keep the public safe and to ensure that London remains a hostile environment for terrorists. Their responsibilities include bringing to justice anyone engaged in terrorism or related offences, preventing and disrupting terrorist activity, gathering and exploiting intelligence on terrorism and extremism in London.

== Professionalism ==
It was first formed as an anti-corruption department by Commissioner Robert Mark in 1971, known as A10 or the Complaints Investigation Bureau (CIB). This was reorganised into the Directorate of Professional Standards under an Assistant Commissioner after changes to the police regulations and the way complaints were handled after the Police Reform Act 2002. It was renamed Professionalism in 2014, still under an Assistant Commissioner. It consists of officers and civilian staff and as of 2023 its commands or departments are:

- Anti-corruption and Abuse (headed by a Commander; already added to the Directorate in October 2022)
- Profession, Crime Prevention, Inclusion and Engagement (headed by a Commander)
- Professional Standards (headed by a Deputy Assistant Commissioner)
- Profession, DPS, Misconduct (headed by a Commander)
- Legal Services (headed by the Chief Legal Officer; taken on from Met Headquarters on the latter's dissolution)

It focuses on standards of professional conduct for officers, and the enforcement of them, in leadership and supervision, security of information and intelligence, recognition of the diversity of communities and staff, identifying and reacting to organisational and individual learning, and maintaining the threat of detection, prevention and management of risk.

Its duty is wider than the issues of complaints and corruption. There are obligations to treat staff fairly and to be seen as an employer of choice, thus the highest standards must be applied to internal processes as well. In order to achieve this it has been expanded to encompass employment tribunals, civil actions against the Commissioner and the vetting of staff.

== Communications and Engagement ==
From 2023, this department covered the duties formerly covered by a Department of Media and Communication within Met Headquarters. It is headed by a Chief Communication and Engagement Officer (as of October Sharon Sawers).

=== Film Unit ===
The MPS Film Unit was launched in 2006 within Shared Support Services (now merged into Operational Support Services) and manages the commercial filming schedule across London on behalf of local councils and major production companies as well as producers for various film and TV commercials. The Film Unit is based in Southwark and is maintained by current serving police officers. The unit provides operational officers to ensure security for film companies and the general public. It is part of the Film London Partnership which is supported by the Department of Culture, Media and Sport, the Mayor of London and Film London.

== Data, Digital and Technology ==
Formerly known as Digital Policing and falling under Met Headquarters, this is led by the Chief Digital and Technology Officer (Darren Scates, as of 2023), who heads directors for:

- Service Delivery
- Technology and Business Engagement
- Solution Delivery

== People and Resources ==
From 2023, this department covered the duties formerly covered by a Departments of Finance, of Commercial, of Property Services and of Human Resources within Met Headquarters. It is headed by a Chief People and Resources Officer (as of October 2023 Clare Davies).

=== Police officer strength 2010–2018 ===
The following table gives the police strength in the MPS by rank.

Date	Constable	Sergeant	Inspector	Ch. inspector	Superintendent	Ch. superintendent	ACPO rank	Total
31 March 2010	24,788	6,069	1,695	475	217	86	37	33,367
31 March 2011	24,595	5,583	1,503	448	196	81	34	32,441
31 March 2012	24,328	5,494	1,641	362	201	79	35	32,140
31 March 2013	23,283	4,982	1,442	452	157	72	31	30,398
31 March 2014	24,420	4,644	1,235	422	109	73	29	30,932
31 March 2015	25,851	4,321	1,103	333	165	76	29	31,877
31 March 2016	25,787	4,548	1,261	279	159	62	29	32,125
31 March 2018	24,149	4,456	1,234	275	197	46	34	30,390

=== Total workforce 2010–2016 ===
The following table gives the workforce numbers in the MPS.

Date	Staff members	PCSOs	Police officers	Total	Special constables
31 March 2010	14,179	4,645	33,367	52,191	3,177
31 March 2011	13,688	4,009	32,441	50,138	4,944
31 March 2012	12,751	2,760	32,140	47,651	5,752
31 March 2013	12,328	2,684	30,398	45,410	5,303
31 March 2014	11,303	2,087	30,932	44,322	4,587
31 March 2015	10,599	1,787	31,877	44,263	3,659
31 March 2016	9,521	1,626	32,125	43,272	3,271

== Strategy and Transformation ==
Strategy and Transformation took over the duties formerly covered by Departments of Transformation and of Strategy and Governance within Met Headquarters and is headed by a Chief Strategy and Transformation Officer (as of October 2023 Adrian Scott).
