= Project Guardian =

Public transport policing operation in London, England

Project Guardian is a joint initiative between British Transport Police (BTP), the Metropolitan Police Service ("the Met"), the City of London Police, and Transport for London (TfL), which aims to combat and increase reporting of sexual harassment on public transport in London. The initiative was inspired by a similar operation in Boston, Massachusetts, and began after a TfL survey revealed that 15% of women who used London's public transport had experienced some form of unwanted sexual behaviour, but that the overwhelming majority of incidents were not reported to the police. Project Guardian aimed to increase reporting and reduce instances of such behaviour.

As part of the project, the police created a confidential hotline and text-messaging service and used social media to raise awareness and encourage reporting. They also staged several "weeks of action", involving increased patrolling of public transport by both uniformed and plain-clothed police officers, including a joint initiative with police officers in several cities in North America, several of which resulted in multiple arrests. In August 2014, the BTP recorded a 21% increase in sex offences, a rise which was attributed partially to increased reporting as result of Project Guardian.

== Background ==
Project Guardian was launched in April 2013, after a survey conducted by Transport for London (TfL) reported widespread fear of sexual harassment among women who use London's public transport, and that 15% of female respondents had encountered unwanted sexual behaviour while using public transport, though around 90% of incidents went unreported. It is a joint venture between British Transport Police (BTP), which polices the rail and metro networks; the Metropolitan Police Service's Safer Transport Command, which is responsible for policing of buses in most of London; the City of London Police; and TfL.

The project was launched with the aim of encouraging the reporting of incidents and creating an atmosphere on public transport which does not tolerate sexual harassment. Addressing the issue of "victim blaming" (in which victims are held partially or entirely responsible for their harassment) BTP Inspector Ricky Twyford, manager of Project Guardian, stated "We don't want anyone to have to change their behaviour to prevent becoming a victim; the only people whose behaviour should change are those who are perpetrating this activity".

The project, reported to be the largest campaign of its kind, was inspired by a similar initiative run by the Massachusetts Bay Transportation Authority (MBTA) in Boston which doubled the level of reporting of sexual offences on the MBTA's network.

== History ==
Project Guardian began with the BTP giving its 2,000 London-based officers specialist training in handling reports of sexual offences, with guidance from three of the UK's leading women's rights groups, the End Violence Against Women Coalition, Hollaback!, and the Everyday Sexism Project. The public launch of the project was with a week-long Twitter chat, hosted by the BTP and the Everyday Sexism Project using the hashtag "#ProjGuardian", which was intended to raise awareness of Project Guardian and to encourage greater reporting of sexual offences, including reporting incidents in real time via Twitter. The police set up a dedicated, confidential telephone hotline and text-messaging service, which were widely publicised to encourage reporting. Project Guardian also covers police attempts to deter unwanted sexual behaviour on public transport, including increased patrols by highly visible and plain-clothed officers.

In early April 2014, officers from Project Guardian were involved in a trans-Atlantic initiative known as "Global Guardian", in which police in Vancouver, Washington DC, Boston, and London all increased patrols on public transport networks and attempted to raise awareness of the initiative among passengers.

Among the tactics police use to deter and detect sexual offences as part of Project Guardian are "weeks of action", which involve large numbers of additional police officers, both high-visibility and in plain clothes, patrolling the transport network in order to raise awareness, gather intelligence, and detect offences. One of the first, in August 2013, involved 185 police officers and resulted in nine arrests. In a week of action in September 2013, police used Twitter to raise awareness of the initiative, and the crackdown resulted in 15 people being arrested. Another, held in March 2014, resulted in 16 arrests.

== Impact ==
Project Guardian was largely praised by campaigners, but shortly after its launch there were calls for the initiative to be extended beyond London.

In October 2013, seven months after the public launch of Project Guardian, the police recorded a 20% increase in reporting of sexual offences on public transport, and a 32% increase in detections. By August 2014, the BTP had recorded a 21% increase in recorded sexual offences across the British railway network, which the chief constable, Paul Crowther, attributed partly to increased reporting as a result of Project Guardian.
