= Lewisham Police Station =

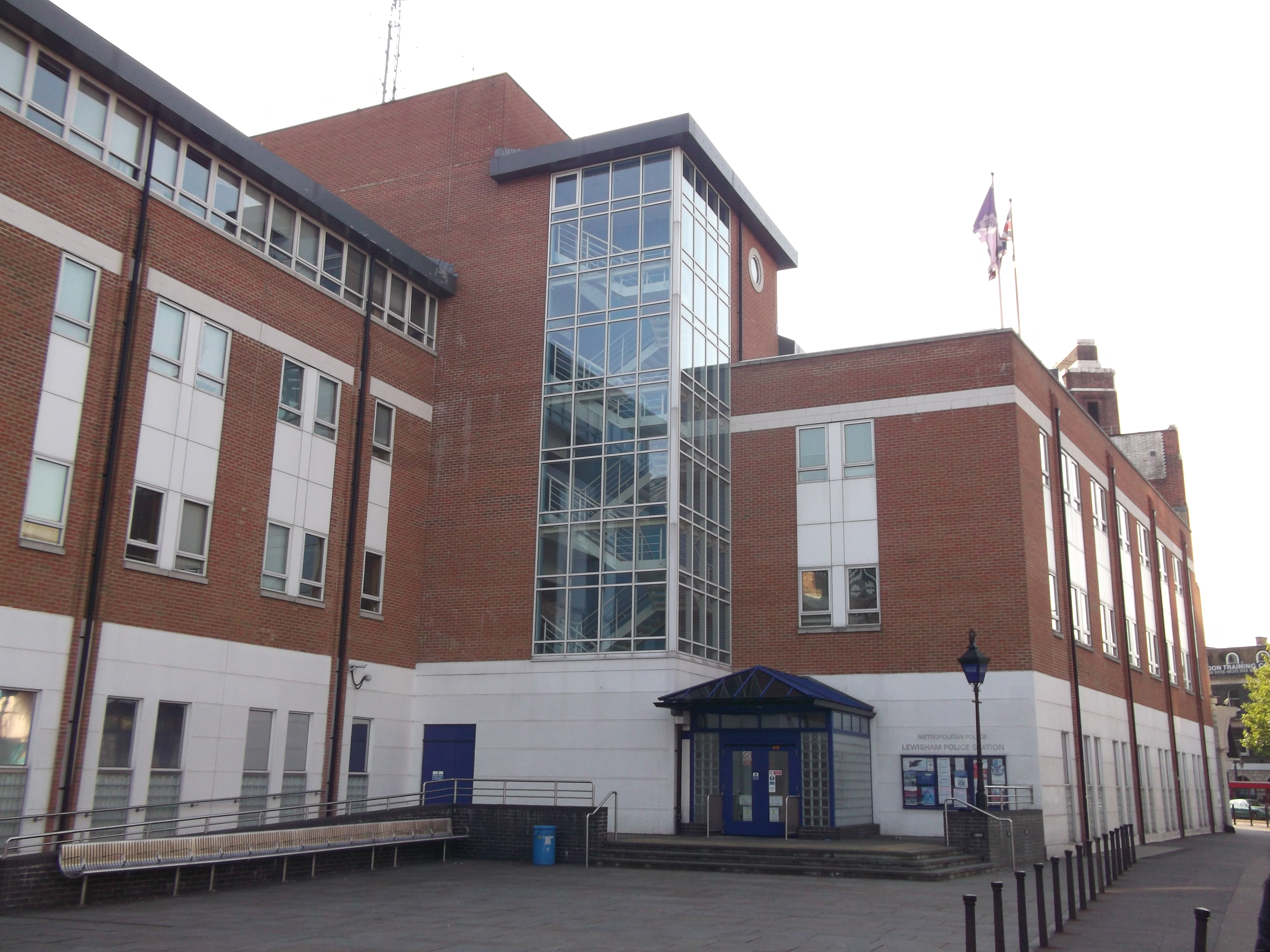
- Lewisham Police Station in September 2011
- Interactive map of the Lewisham Police Station area

General information
- Location: Lewisham, London, England
- Coordinates: 51.4634°N 0.0099°W
- Construction started: 26 November 2001
- Topped-out: 17 July 2002
- Opened: 16 April 2004
- Owner: Metropolitan Police

Lewisham Police Station is in Lewisham High Street in the London Borough of Lewisham.

== History ==
The station was built to replace the nearby Ladywell Police Station and was one of four stations procured under a private finance initiative (PFI) between the Metropolitan Police Authority and Equion (part of the John Laing Group). The contract was signed in October 2001, and was valued at £120 million, of which Lewisham accounted for approximately £30 million.

Construction began on 26 November 2001, on the site of the old Army & Navy Store on Lewisham High Street, and the new building was topped-out on 17 July 2002. It was official opened by Sir John Stevens, Commissioner of the Metropolitan Police, on 16 April 2004.

== Facilities ==
The station is the largest purpose-built police station in Europe, and contains the largest custody suite in the Metropolitan Police, as well as stables for 36 police horses and a multi-storey car park.
