= Matt Twist =

British police officer

Matt Twist KPM

Assistant Commissioner of the Metropolitan Police
- Incumbent
- Assumed office August 2023
- Preceded by: Louisa Rolfe

Deputy Assistant Commissioner of the Metropolitan Police
- In office April 2018 – August 2023

Personal details
- Born: Matthew Twist
- Profession: Police officer
- Awards: King's Police Medal

Matthew Twist KPM is a senior British police officer, serving in the Metropolitan Police from 1996 to 2013 and 2016 to present, with the intervening period spent in Surrey Police. It was announced in September 2022 that he would become Temporary Assistant Commissioner for Met Operations, in which role he succeeded Louisa Rolfe; he was appointed to that rank permanently in August 2023. Since 2024, he has been Assistant Commissioner for Frontline Policing.

== Career ==
First assigned to teams in the Royal Borough of Kensington and Chelsea, Twist also spent time in firearms and Special Branch. His time with Surrey Police saw a rise from Chief Superintendent to Temporary Assistant Chief Constable. His second period with the Metropolitan Police included time as Commander for Firearms and Met Taskforce and as the National Police Chiefs’ Council lead for restraint and self-defence, prior to a promotion to Deputy Assistant Commissioner in April 2018, at which rank he served as the Gold Commander for the Metropolitan Police's COVID-19 response.

== Honours ==

Ribbon	Description	Notes
	King's Police Medal	2025; For Distinguished Service
	Queen Elizabeth II Golden Jubilee Medal	2002; UK version
	Queen Elizabeth II Diamond Jubilee Medal	2012; UK version
	Queen Elizabeth II Platinum Jubilee Medal	2022; UK version
	King Charles III Coronation Medal	2023; UK version
	Police Long Service and Good Conduct Medal	
