= MetCC =

Communications centre within London's Metropolitan Police Service

MetCC, also known as the Met Contact Centre, Met Command and Control or MO12, is a department of Met Operations within Greater London's Metropolitan Police Service. It is the communications centre responsible for receiving emergency and non-emergency contact within the Metropolitan Police, the deployment of police resources and the command and control of special operations. MetCC operates out of three centres located at Lambeth, Hendon and Bow.

== Historic operating model ==
Historically, each of the Met's Borough Operational Command Units (BOCUs) had its own control room, known internally as the 'CAD Room' (for Computer Aided Despatch) which dealt with incoming non-emergency calls and with despatching police to all calls in that area. In addition, the Information Room at New Scotland Yard received 999 calls which were sent to the CAD Room to be dealt with. In 2004, staff began to migrate on a borough-by-borough basis to MetCC, with Southwark being the first BOCU to move.

== The C3i programme ==
Led by DAC Ron McPherson and Dr Amanat Hussain, the C3i programme (Communication, Command, Control & Information) was the largest police transformation programme undertaken in the UK. Working with Chief Superintendent Stephen MacDonald, the Operational Command Unit (OCU) Commander for MetCC, the C3i programme modernised the command and control infrastructure to create seamless communications service for the Metropolitan Police Service to give the people of London a robust and resilient response policing service, getting the right people in the right place at the right time with the right information. The C3i Programme delivered optimised end to end Command and Control processes, new operational command unit (Central Communications Command), new Casualty Bureau Facility, largest Special Operations Room, Integrated Borough Operations Rooms and Telephone Investigation Bureau services.

== Command and control ==
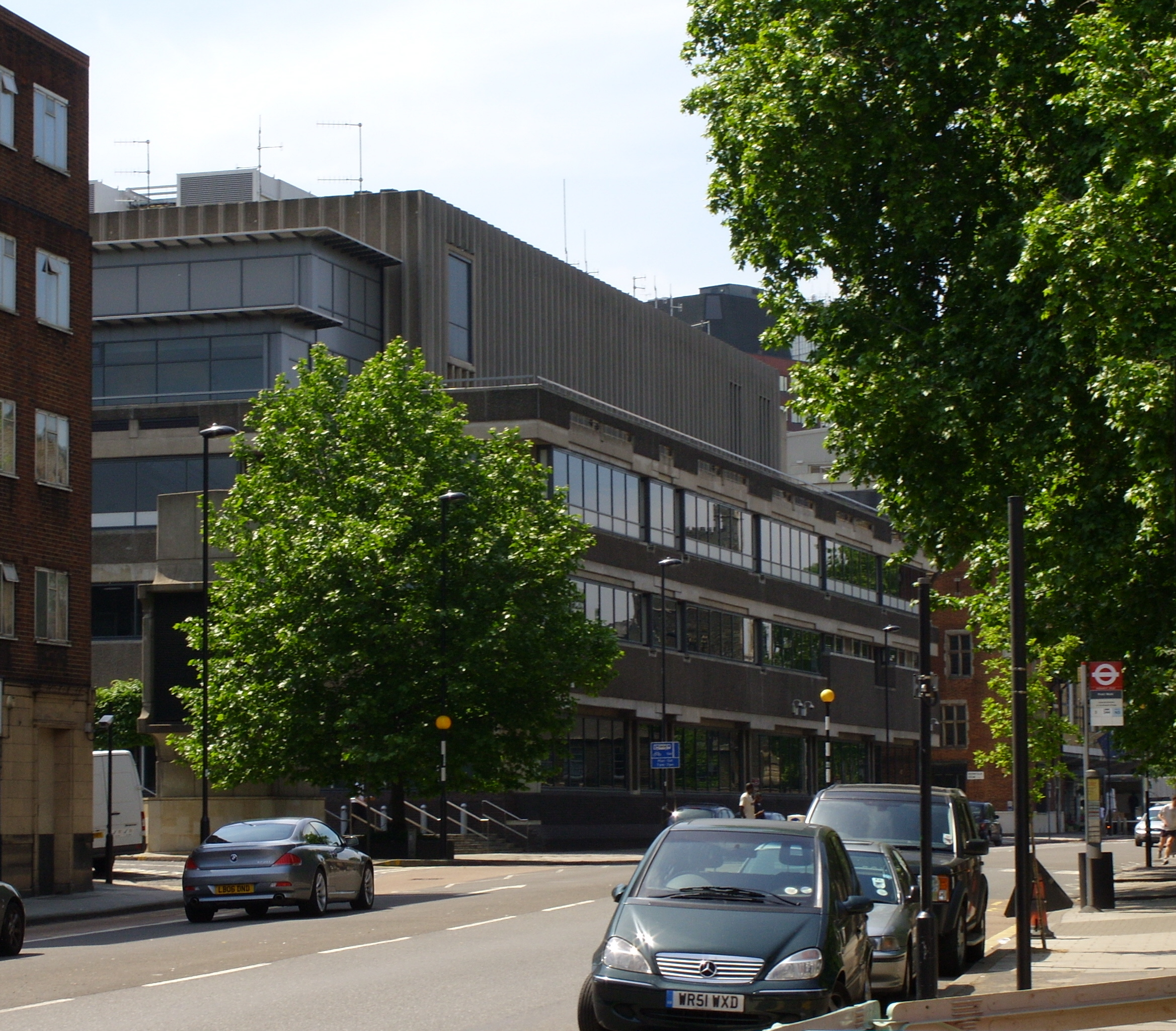
One of the three CCC centres. Note the array of Airwave antennae on the roof.

Following completion of the C3i programme in late 2007, all Met communications are dealt with at three dedicated centres at Hendon, Bow and Lambeth, covering west; north and east; and south London respectively. Within each centre is a call receipt facility, called First Contact and a dispatching facility called Dispatch. In First Contact call takers sit in pods of twelve positions, each pod having its own supervisor. Dispatching pods have two or three dispatcher and one supervisor position. The size of the dispatching pod depends on how busy the borough that it supports is. Patrol officers are dispatched through the Airwave radios and by sending information direct to the MDT terminal in every police vehicle.

== Call handling ==
Calls are routed to a First Contact operator known as a Communications Officer. If the request or enquiry needs to be recorded by the police, a record is created on the Contact Handling System (CHS), a tailored iteration of the AIT Portrait CRM product. If a police officer needs to be dispatched, the record is transferred to the Computer Aided Despatch (CAD) application, and a CAD record will be created.

=== Graded response ===
Once the initial information has been inputted, the CAD will be allocated a grade of urgency. All calls are given one of four grades:

- Immediate (I) grade - 'I' grade calls are calls where "the immediate presence of a police officer will have a significant impact on the outcome of an incident". This is typically categorised as where there is, or is likely to be, a danger to life, a serious threat of violence, serious damage to property or serious injury. The response time to a call of this urgency is 15 minutes.
- Significant (S) grade - 'S' grade calls are calls where there is a "degree of importance or urgency associated with the initial police action, but an emergency response is not required". The response time to a call of this urgency is 60 minutes.
- Extended (E) grade - 'E' grade calls are calls where a police attendance is required, but an emergency police response is not. The response time to a call of this urgency is 48 hours.
- Referred (R) grade - 'R' grade calls are calls where a police attendance is not required. This typically means that the caller has been dealt with appropriately by the call handler.

Once the CAD report has been created, it is passed to the relevant Dispatch for the borough in question to decide what officers to deploy to it. The Supervisor (see below) can change the grading of the call if necessary, but only in exceptional circumstances.

== Staff structure ==
Central Communications Command is unique within the Metropolitan Police in its staff structure. It is both the largest Operational Command Unit in the MPS (and the United Kingdom) and is primarily staffed by highly trained police staff, instead of police officers. It’s also the most diverse command in the Met. MetCC retains some police officers working alongside Communications Officers and Supervisors and in roles identified as requiring a police officer in legislation.

=== Duty Officers ===
Two ’‘Duty Officers’’ are concurrently on duty in each of the three Metcall centers, resulting in a combined total of six officers on duty across the entire network. The Duty Officers are responsible for decisions made within the centre and are also entrusted with ensuring the well-being of the staff under their care.

=== CAD Supervisors ===
In each "pod," which typically spans two to four Operational Command Units, has two dedicated CAD Supervisors. Their responsibilities include overseeing Operators, taking charge of challenging situations, and making final decisions on incident closure. Additionally, a subset of Supervisors manages the First Contact process, ensuring accurate call handling. The Supervisor role is staffed by either a Sergeant or an experienced police staff Communications Supervisor.

Supervisors are sometimes erroneously labeled as "Controllers," a term associated with a historic role predating the C3i programme.

=== CAD Operators (Communications Officers) ===
CAD Operators (also known as Communications Officer) make up the majority of operational MetCC staff.

==== Job role ====
CAD Operators perform two functions. In the First Contact (FC) role (also known as call receipt), they answer 999 and non-emergency telephone calls to police and enter the details of the call onto the MPS computer system. In the Despatch role they read the details of the calls as entered by First Contact, decide on the appropriate action to take, and, when police deployment is necessary, assign police officers using Airwave radios or by sending information directly to the MDT terminal of police vehicles. Most CAD Operators rotate between the two roles, but some are dedicated to one or the other.

The title "CAD Operator" originates from the Computer Assisted Despatch program that the MPS has used since 1984; while this system is still in use, it was superseded by the new Contact Handling System platform for First Contact.

==== Operator numbers ====
There are just over 2,000 CAD Operator positions within the MPS, and approximately 400-500 theoretically on duty at any given time.
