= Right to Be =

Nonprofit organization

Right to Be (formerly Hollaback!)
- Type: Activist group
- Purpose: Harassment, bystander intervention
- Website: righttobe.org

Right to Be (formerly Hollaback!) is a nonprofit organization working to end harassment in all its forms, through bystander intervention trainings, storytelling, and grassroots initiatives.

Right To Be started as a public blog in 2005 where people could document their experiences of harassment. In May 2010, co-founder Emily May became Right to Be's first full-time executive director, and the organization successfully raised close to $15,000 on the internet fundraising platform, Kickstarter, to fund the development and release of the Hollaback! iPhone application. Since then, the organization has received funding from New York Women's Foundation, the Ms. Foundation, Voqal, the Knight Foundation, Craig Newmark Philanthropies, Ashoka, and the New York City Government.

The organization has created Bystander Intervention Trainings to teach people how to combat harassment, using a methodology called the "5Ds of Bystander Intervention".

As times continue to evolve, Right to Be has begun to offer trainings and resources on other topics such as How to Respond to Harassment; Conflict De-Escalation; Resilience trauma-informed, Online Harassment, Active shooter, Unconscious Bias, and Workplace Harassment.

== History ==
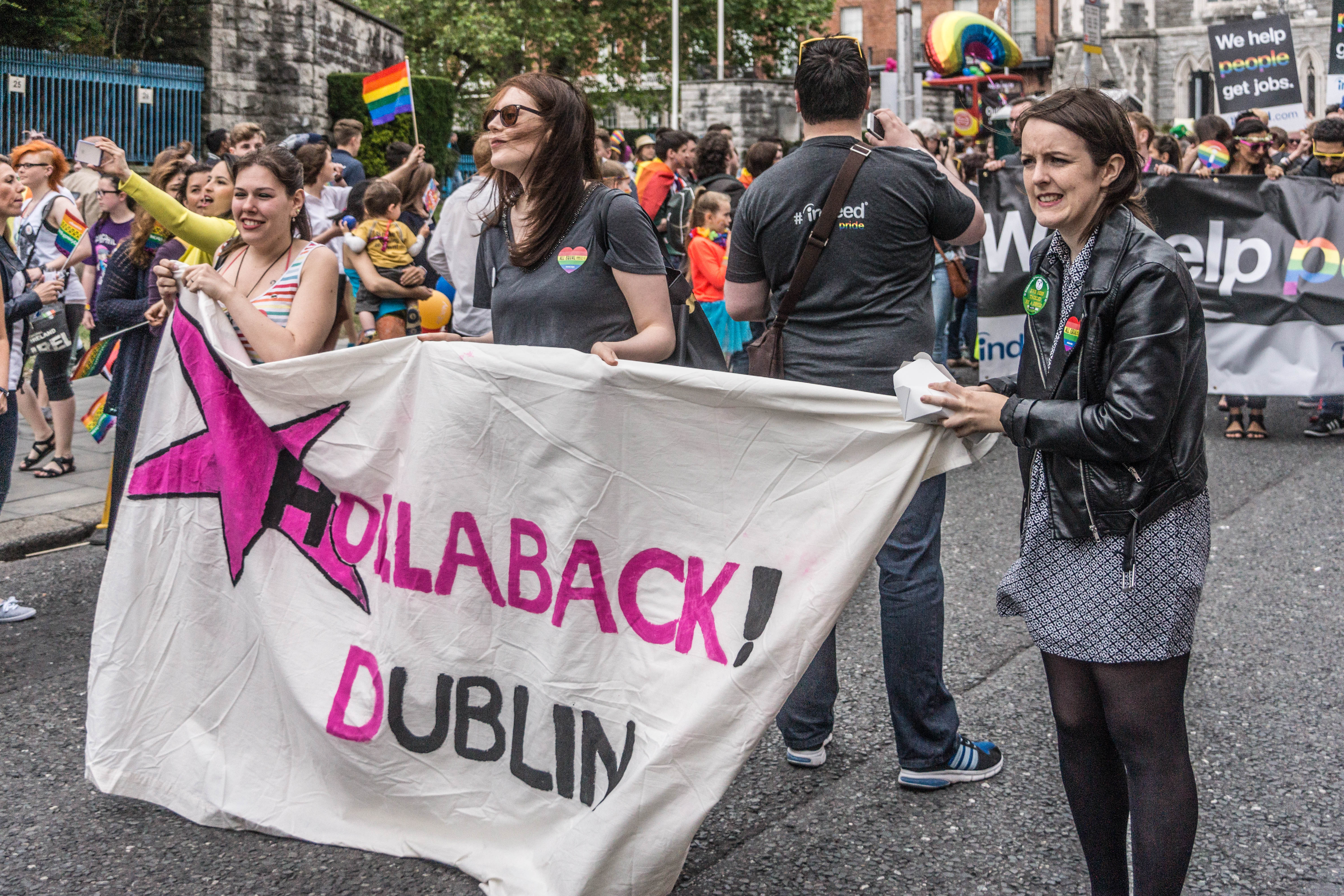
Hollaback! at the Dublin gay pride in 2015

Seven New York City residents, four women and three men, founded the organization in 2005, under the not for profit, Artistic Evolucion, Inc, after a well-publicized occurrence of street harassment prompted them to discuss their own encounters. After being ignored by the police, a woman named Thao Nguyen uploaded a photo she had taken of the man who had masturbated across from her on the subway. This photo appeared on the front page of the New York Daily News, and inspired the seven New York City residents to apply this same method to all forms of street harassment. The women told story after story of their experiences with street harassment, experiences that were surprising to the men in the group because they had never dealt with harassment of that kind They collectively decided to do something about the issue of street harassment, an issue that affects women, girls, and LGBTQ individuals every day.

Right to Be has held many events around the world designed to raise awareness about street harassment, including film screenings, lectures, demonstrations, and book talks.

On October 28, 2010, the New York City Council held the first hearing ever on street harassment. Council Member Julissa Ferreras, who chairs the Women's Issues Committee, called the hearing in order to stress the importance of joining forces in order to take action specifically in New York City. Each panelist recommended three steps towards eliminating street harassment: 1) A citywide study, focusing on the impact of street harassment and girls; 2) a citywide public information campaign that educates all genders and ages that harassment is unacceptable is the second point of action proposed; and 3) establishing "harassment-free zones" in schools in order to raise awareness and support of the movement. Emily May was among the speakers at the hearing; she encouraged women to speak out against street harassment.

After this hearing, New York City legislators invested $28,500 in Hollaback!. This investment gave the organization the infrastructure needed to report street harassment incidents to the New York City Council, via their platform "Councilstat."

The anti-harassment blog connected to Hollaback! expanded to many cities including Atlanta, Baltimore, Berkeley, Houston, Des Moines, Chicago, Columbia, Philadelphia, and Portland during this time. Prior to launching a new site, site leaders are first trained by Hollaback! employees so that they will have the skills necessary to operate their own blog.

In January 2011, Right to Be scaled internationally. In 2013, the London branch was involved in Project Guardian, a police initiative to reduce sexual harassment on public transport, including assisting in training of police officers to respond to complaints of sexual assaults.

In 2012, Right to Be launched the "College Initiative" which was a campaign that aimed to end sexual harassment on college campuses. Through their app and college-specific websites, Hollaback! was able to track instances of harassment on college campuses and create a map to demonstrate the impact of harassment at each site.

In 2015, Right to Be partnered with Cornell University to conduct the largest international study to date on street harassment.

In 2016, Right to Be launched HeartMob, a platform to help end online harassment by reporting instances of online harassment and allowing others to show support for those being harassed. Since 2005, the Hollaback! blog and HeartMob, which have combined into one story-telling platform, have received over 32,000 stories of harassment.

In 2020, Right to Be partnered with L’Oréal to create a program called Stand Up Against Street Harassment which aims to treat bystanders how to combat street harassment. As of June 2023, the campaign has trained over 1.8 million people in 42 countries.

With the increased conversations around Black Lives Matter after the murder of George Floyd at the hands of a police officer in 2020, Right to Be launched 2 new free trainings: Bystander Intervention Training to Stop Police-Sponsored and Anti-Black Racist Harassment. Furthermore, as anti-Asian crimes continued to increase during this time and into 2021 due to the COVID-19 pandemic, Right to Be created trainings around anti-Asian harassment. in partnership with Asian Americans Advancing Justice | AAJC, The organization then started to offer new trainings on Bystander Intervention 2.0 - Conflict De-escalation and How to Respond to Harassment for People Experiencing Anti-Asian/American Harassment in multiple languages.

In 2022, AARP, Right To Be, and Asian Americans Advancing Justice | AAJC partnered to produce a series of animated videos to introduce bystander intervention methods.

== Partnerships ==
In addition to their partnership with L’Oréal, Right to Be has partnered with a variety of organizations to help create more specific bystander intervention trainings for different minority groups. These groups include:

- Houston Coalition Against Hate
- Asian Americans Advancing Justice
- Asian Americans Advancing Justice- Chicago
- Asian Americans Advancing Justice Southern California
- PEN America
- CAIR-Chicago
- Eye to Eye
- Futures Without Violence
- 1 Million Madly Motivated Moms
- ANJEL Tech
- LA vs. Hate
- National Center for Transgender Equality
- Raheem
- Red Wine & Blue
- Self Offense
- Sibling Leadership Network
- Supermajority
- T'ruah
- viaSport

== Storytelling ==
Right To Be’s "Storytelling Platform". allows people to share their stories of harassment both online and offline and allows people to offer messages of support to those who have experienced instances of harassment. People experiencing online harassment can also receive support from the community that can help in reporting and documenting abusive online behavior. Research has shown that through posting stories of harassment online, people can see their experience as a part of a larger systematic issue rather than an isolated instance and feel validated in their experience.

Furthermore, in a study of the platform in 2021, 57% of people found the platform useful for healing from their trauma of harassment and 76% of people found value in sending messages of support to others.

The platform also offers an opportunity for journalists who are experiencing harassment to make a journalist account through a partnership with International Women’s Media Foundation (IWMF) due to the unique nature of harassment for women and gender-expansive journalists.

== Anti-harassment video ==
In October 2014, Rob Bliss Creative created a video which showed Shoshana Roberts, a white woman in New York City, being harassed by men. In one scene, a man followed Shoshana for five minutes. The video included a call to donate to Hollaback! in order to stop this harassment.

While 30–40% of the incidents of harassment in the video are perpetrated by white men, men of color are on camera for the largest portion of the video. Numerous writers accused the video of being racist. The organization later apologized for the "racial bias" in the video. A petition at change.org was created to ask Hollaback! to release the entire 10 hours of footage, so people can see if it the two-minute video was selectively edited to be racist. Hollaback! was not able to release the footage because they didn't make it or own it, it was created by Rob Bliss. Response to the video has included rape and death threats to subject of the video and some journalists defended the behavior shown in the video, in some cases adding catcalls of their own.
