= Jonathan Tokeley-Parry =

Convicted smuggler

Jonathan Tokeley-Parry was a self-proclaimed former cavalryman and self-appointed antique restorer. He smuggled more than 3,000 pieces of Egyptian antiquities out of Egypt by disguising them as reproductions.

== Career ==
In the early 1990s, Tokeley-Parry smuggled thousands of antiques out of Egypt by using his knowledge of restoration to camouflage them into look-a-likes. He would then ship them overseas to a duty-free port in order to avoid raising suspicion.

He was successful in his endeavors for four years before he was caught and put on trial. He was caught when an assistant took 27 papyrus textbooks to the British Museum to be checked for authenticity upon the buyers' request. The evaluator realized that the textbooks were stolen goods from Egypt and reported them right away. He was sentenced to six years for each of the artifact handling charges as well as charged with illegally obtaining a passport. These sentences were to be carried out concurrently. Before this case, he had been involved in another case. All cases were dropped when Tokeley-Parry tried to commit suicide by swallowing hemlock. Just days later he was sentenced to 15 years hard labour by Egyptian courts. Although sentenced to 15 years he only served time in a British prison from 1997 until 2000.

Tokeley-Parry recruited Mark Perry to assist in his scheme. During 1992 and 1993, the two completed a number of trips to Egypt. The way in which they were successful in smuggling these artifacts was through deception. They would paint the artifacts in a translucent plastic material then dip it fully in either gold leaf or paint. They then would alter the hieroglyphics to make them look like fakes and pass them off as tourist junk. He even went as far into camouflaging as to wrap them in wrapping paper from gift shops. Since they began the process by covering the artifact in the clear plastic paint-like material, it made it very easy to remove once smuggled into Britain. He sold the pieces to dealers in London and New York for hundreds of thousands of dollars.

== Death ==
Tokeley-Parry died on October 9, 2025, at the age of 74, after an overdose. At the time of his death, he had been working on a new book titled Smuggler's Blues.
