= Police support unit (United Kingdom) =

United Kingdom police unit type

A Police Support Unit or PSU is a unit of police officers who have undergone specialist tactical training in Public Order and Riot Control.

== About ==
Police Support Unit training in the United Kingdom is voluntary tactical training undertaken by selected candidates that provides students with the skills required to safely and effectively deal with a variety of public order situations outside the remit or capability of regular divisional officers. Comparable units in the United States are local SWAT teams, trained to deal with situations beyond normal police work.

PSU-trained officers in the UK are commonly referred to as Level 2, Mutual Aid Support Trained, or PSU officers.

== Equipment ==
The majority of UK Police Forces use Mercedes-Benz Sprinter vans, commonly referred to as 'Carriers', as standard transport for PSUs. A notable exception is the Police Service of Northern Ireland, whose Tactical Support Group officers famously use armoured Land Rovers. These vehicles are equipped with mesh window shields and/or high-impact-resistant polycarbonate windscreens and outfitted with storage compartments for officers' riot control equipment as well as Method of Entry and CBRN kit. Carrier drivers must undergo specialist driver training in 'riot conditions' before qualifying as a carrier driver. The Metropolitan Police's Territorial Support Group also maintains a fleet of armoured Ford F450 based Jankel Guardians for use in serious public order situations, like the 2011 England riots. These are identical to, and interchangeable with, the Guardians used by SCO18 Aviation Command and SCO19 Firearms Command.

Standard kit for PSU officers consists of a transparent acrylic riot shield, a baton, a visored 'NATO' helmet, shin and elbow guards, along with fireproof coveralls when required. Taser is a recent addition to the PSU officer's armoury. This level of protection allows officers to deal with a variety of violent situations, including riots, football violence and suspects armed with a variety of weapons. Some PSU teams are also dual-trained as first-line responders for CBRN incidents and carry relevant detection kit as well as major incident equipment.

== Training ==
PSU officers are trained to a higher standard of operational readiness than their divisional counterparts. Training exercises undertaken encompass a variety of public order scenarios; officers will undergo extensive riot training including being petrol bombed in large scale engagements, prison clearance tactics, football stadium scenarios, night club scenarios, aircraft, rail and various 'angry-man' scenarios, as well as additional specialist training including use of stun grenades and distraction devices. PSU units spend considerable time training with other specialist police teams as well as certain military units.

== Organisation ==
A PSU consists of:

- 1 Inspector (red epaulettes)
- 3 Sergeants (white epaulettes)
- 18 Constables (black epaulettes)

A PSU may be supported by:

- Police Medic - PSU Officer with advanced 1st aid training and equipment (green epaulettes)
- Evidence Gatherers - PSU Officers equipped with video recording equipment (orange epaulettes)
- Tactical Advisor - PSU Officers trained to advise the PSU Commander in lawful use of tactics (blue epaulettes)
- Bronze Commander - A PSU Officer, usually a Chief Inspector or higher, who is in charge of a Public Order Situation (yellow epaulettes)

== PSU grades ==
All officers will be trained to the common minimum standards as defined in the ACPO Public Order Tactical Trainers Manual. The grades are dependent on the training that the officer has received.

- Level 1 - these officers (normally full-time PSU) receive regular specialist training which can be every five weeks including shield tactics, violent person, petrol bombing, crowd extractions and training in house entry and search. All public order officers need to be fit; a Level 1 officer must be able to run 1000 metres, dressed in full protective equipment whilst carrying a long shield, in less than 6 minutes.
- Level 2 - These officers are drawn from Boroughs/Divisions; they receive similar training to Level 1 officers but only in basic public order functions and tactics. Level 2 also only attend their specialist training centre two days a year for training. In some forces Level 2 officers must be able to run 500 metres dressed in full protective equipment whilst carrying a long shield in less than 2 mins 45 secs however this is no longer a national standard. If an officer fails any of the runs they are returned to their Borough/Division without receiving training or qualification. Officers are required to achieve 6.4 as a minimum on the bleep test to qualify for level 2. The long shields carried are 5'6" tall, 1'11" wide and weigh 17 lbs.
- Level 3 - All other police officers are classed as being level 3 trained, this they will have received in their last week at training school, their training includes all foot duty cordons, and mounted branch deployments. This training is delivered in approximately a half a day class and covers basic tactics.

== Full-time PSU ==
Most police forces maintain full-time PSU sections whose role is to provide a wide range of specialist services in addition to high visibility core policing. Forces that do not maintain a full-time PSU section will have PSU trained officers in other roles (such as standard response roles) who can be called upon by a rota system.

As well as PSU they (full-time units) may be called, dependent on the police force:

- Tactical Enforcement Unit (Sussex Police)
- Support Group (City of London)
- Catch (Avon & Somerset Constabulary)
- Tactical Support Group (Leicestershire Constabulary, Surrey Police, Gloucestershire Police, Police Service of Northern Ireland)
- Operational Support Unit (Ministry of Defence Police, British Transport Police, Lancashire Constabulary, Lincolnshire Police, West Midlands Police, West Yorkshire Police (formerly Operation Target Team), Police Scotland)
- Tactical Aid Unit (Greater Manchester Police)
- Force Support Group (Devon and Cornwall Police)
- Divisional Support Unit (Hertfordshire Constabulary, Kent Police)
- Territorial Support Group (Metropolitan Police, Nottinghamshire Police)
- Matrix Disruption Team (Merseyside Police)
- Vector (Cheshire Police)
- Area Support Group (Northumbria Police)
- Task Force/Operational Support Services (South Yorkshire Police, Derbyshire Constabulary)
- Operational Support Group (Essex Police, Isle of Man Constabulary)
- Tasking Team (West Mercia Police)
- Territorial Support Team (South Wales Police)

=== Core functions ===
The core functions of the support unit, dependent on the police force or service are:

- Public order/Riot Control
- Apprehension of dangerous offenders
- Cell relocation of problem prisoners
- Security/VIP/Royalty searches
- Military Convoy/Hi-Risk Prisoner Escort
- Missing person search
- Method of entry (MOE) or Door breaching
- Critical/Major Incident Response
- Chemical, Biological, Radiological or Nuclear (CBRN) Response
- Pool of Authorised Firearm Officers
- Decoy Ops/Test Purchase/Surveillance/Proactive Operations
- Rope Access and Confined-Space Search Teams
- Body Recovery Teams
- Divisional/Borough Support

=== Other PSU elements ===
- Dog Section
- Mounted Section
- Firearms unit

== Special Constabulary ==
As with their full-time counterparts, some Special Constables are trained in public order duties, including policing of football matches and demonstrations. In West Yorkshire Police, 24 specials have received Level 2 PSU - Police Support Unit training, and have become part of the 'Operation Target' team.

PSU Level 2 training is also available to Special Constables in the following forces, where they are deployed as an integral part of regular PSUs.

- City of London Police where SC officers fully integrate into PSUs as part of in-force, pan London and national mutual aid deployments. Their compliment includes officers trained and deployed in Constable, Sergeant and Inspector roles, along with qualified PSU medics.

- Cheshire Police, where there are enough officers to commit a full deployment. Attendance at football matches is regular as well as assisting other forces on mutual aid.

- Greater Manchester Police (as of September 2023)

- Police Scotland

- Suffolk Constabulary (as of April 2022)

- Norfolk Constabulary (as of April 2022)

- Lancashire Constabulary (as of May 2024)

- Lincolnshire Police (as of November 2019)

- Avon & Somerset Constabulary (as of 2014 where they regularly deploy to football matches and as part of the response to protests and violent disorders)

== See also ==
- Operational Support Unit (Ministry of Defence Police)
- Special Constabulary
- Police Intelligence
- Operations Support Group - New South Wales Police Force, Australia equivalent.
- Police Tactical Unit (Hong Kong) - Hong Kong Police
