= Metropolitan Police Mounted Branch =

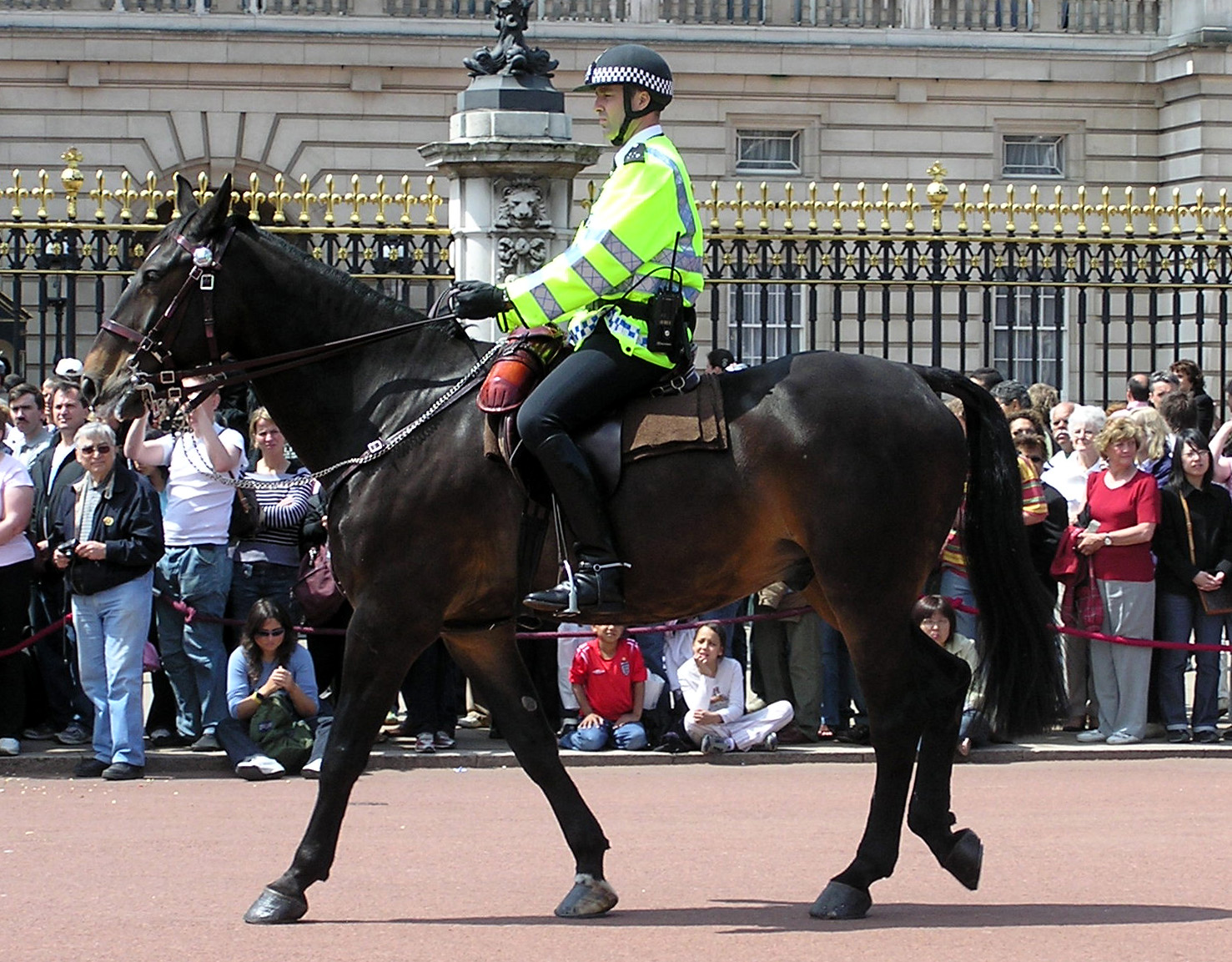
Mounted Met police officer outside Buckingham Palace.

The Metropolitan Police Mounted Branch is the mounted police branch of London's Metropolitan Police. It is part of Met Operations.

== History ==
The Bow Street Horse Patrol was formed in 1763, but ceased after eighteen months when funding ran out. Revived in 1805, it was attached to the new Metropolitan Police in 1836 and formally merged into it three years later via Chapter VI of that year's Metropolitan Police Act. Mounted patrols from the Metropolitan Police's stations continued, but the modern Mounted Branch was only formalised in 1918 by Percy Laurie, a retired British Army officer.

== Operations ==
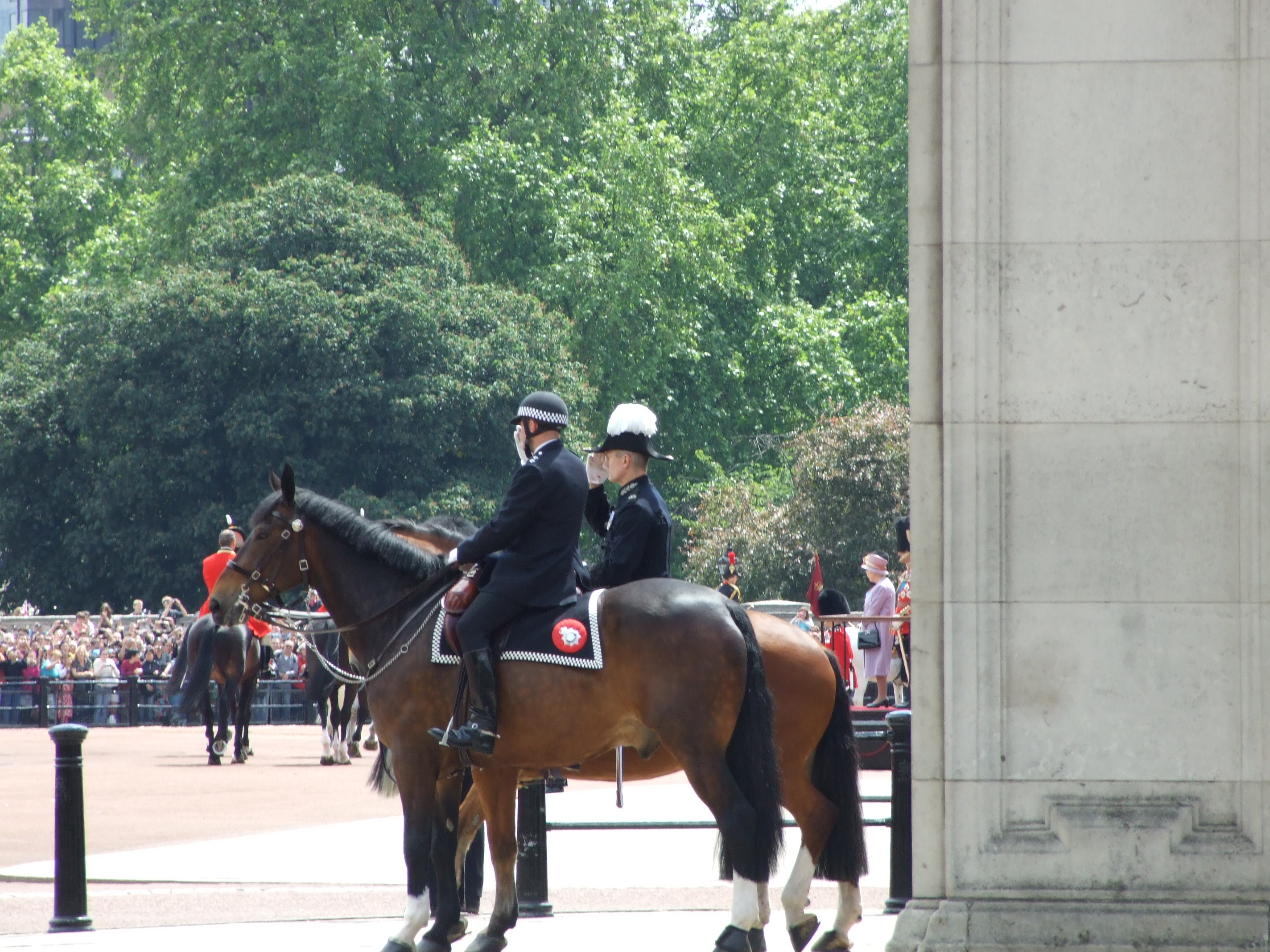
Senior mounted officers on duty at the Queen's Birthday Parade.

Figures released by the Met under a Freedom of Information Act request showed that the annual number of police horses in the MPS Mounted Branch Unit in calendar years 2009 to 2018 ranged from a low of 100 to a high of 116. As of 2016, the annual average cost incurred by the police force was £5,558 per horse, not including stabling, and there were 142 police officers qualified to ride. The total budget for the mounted unit was £9,969,736 in 2018. The police horses used are typically either half thoroughbred and half draft breed, or three-quarters thoroughbred and one-quarter draft breed.

The police horses are used for patrols of London's main parks; for ceremonial events; and for crowd control at events such as football matches. A 2014 RAND Europe/University of Oxford Centre for Criminology study found: "While mounted police in the UK are traditionally thought of as public-order policing resources, deployment data show that they spend between 60-70 per cent of their time in local area patrols, and 10-20 per cent of their time in public order work, with the remainder spent in activities such as ceremonial deployments." A typical daily patrol is 9–10 miles (14–16 km), but a police horse escort of the King's Troop, Royal Horse Artillery from its St John's Wood barracks to central London is 16 miles (26 km).

The Branch has eight stables: Hyde Park, Lewisham Police Station, Great Scotland Yard, Hammersmith, West Hampstead, Bow Road, Kings Cross, and Imber Court in East Molesey, Surrey. The horses are trained at the latter site.

The City of London Police, which is separate from the Met Police, also maintains a mounted unit.
