= Dog Support Unit (Metropolitan Police) =

English police unit

The Dog Support Unit (DSU) is a Met Operations branch of London's Metropolitan Police, providing trained police dogs and police officer handlers.

== Unit budget, composition, and duties ==
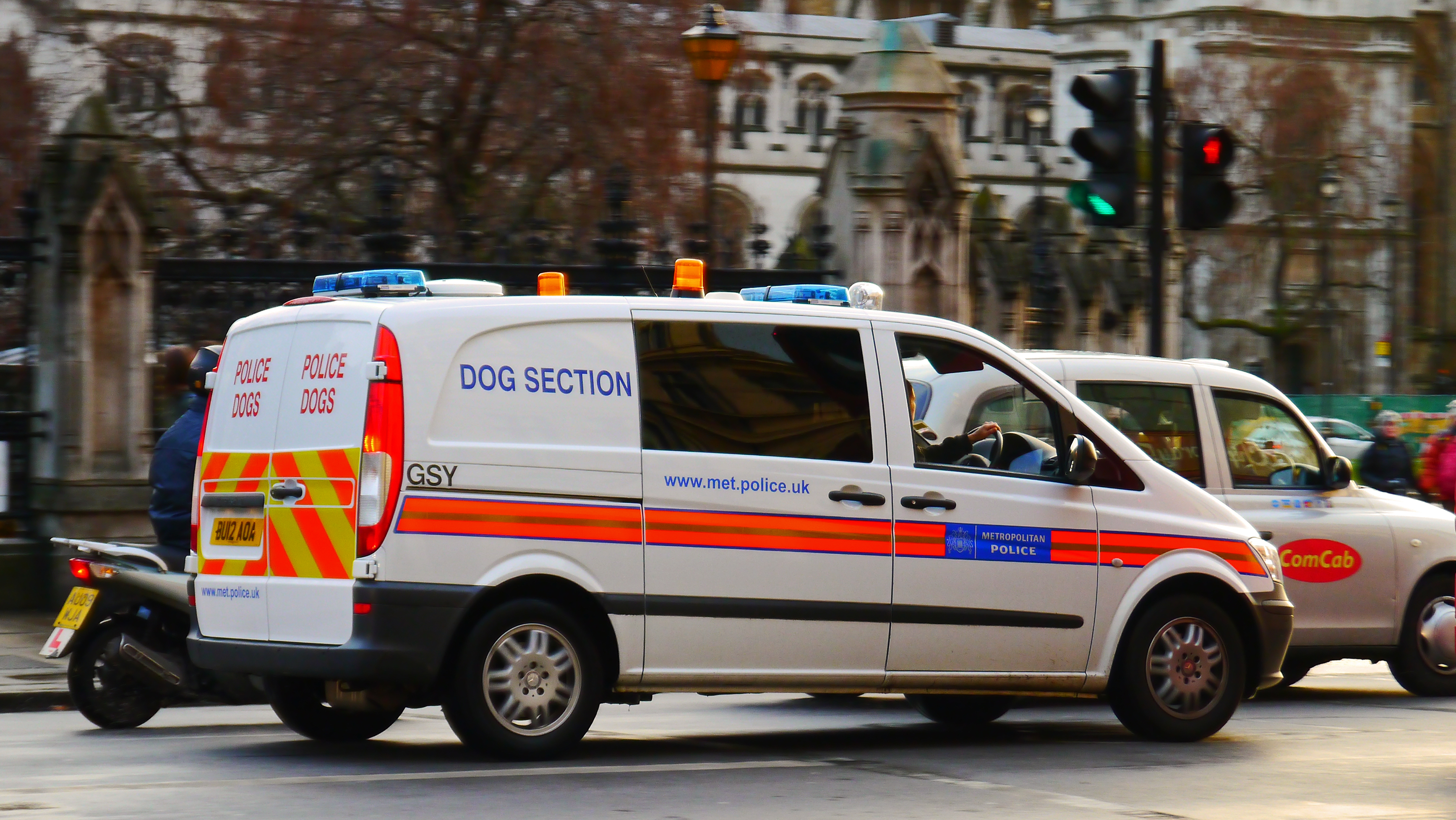
A Dog Support Unit van in Westminster, central London.

As of mid-2019, the Met reported a total of 226 dogs in operational police service, classified as 116 general purpose dogs, 53 firearms, cash, and drug search dogs, 41 explosives search dogs, 14 forensic evidence search dogs, and two digital media search dogs. The Met reported 186 officers and 20 police staff working full-time in the unit. Over the period 2009 to 2018, the dog unit budget ranged from approximately £13.2 million to approximately £15.6 million. "General purpose" dogs are German shepherds and Malinois (Belgian shepherds); search dogs included Springer Spaniels, Cocker Spaniels, and Labrador Retrievers.

Police dogs responded to the 2011 London riots, and at least one was wounded.

Alongside other Metropolitan Police units, the Dog Support Unit participated in a counter-terrorism training exercise on the River Thames in 2017. In 2018, it was reported that the Met had spent more than £1 million on a pilot project to train police dogs in counter-terrorism.

== Incidents ==
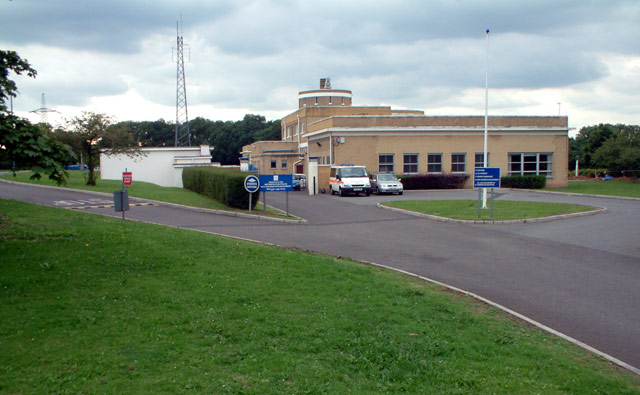
The Dog Training Establishment in Keston.

In 2014, figures released under the Freedom of Information Act showed that in the preceding three years, 827 people were bitten by Metropolitan Police dogs, and that "While the majority were suspects being pursued by the force, 53 were members of the public or police officers. It is not known how many of the suspects were found guilty of crimes or cleared." The Met paid £243,363 to compensation to dog-bite victims over that three-year period, and £95,000 made in the preceding three-year period.

In 2004, a police dog died at the Met's training school for police dogs in Keston, south east London, and a police constable was reprimanded. In June 2011 the same dog-handler officer, who had been promoted to sergeant, locked two police dogs in his car for hours on one of the hottest days of the year, and the dogs died from heat exhaustion. The officer resigned from the police force and admitted in Westminster Magistrates' Court to causing unnecessary suffering; the court ordered him to pay £3,240 in court costs, and banned him from owning dogs for three years.
