= Met Operations =

Business group of the Metropolitan Police Service

Met Operations, also known as Met Ops, is one of the eight business groups which forms the Metropolitan Police Service and is responsible for providing operational support services. It was created during the 2018–19 restructuring of the service, amalgamating many of its functions from the Operations side of the Specialist Crime & Operations Directorate formed in 2012, with the Specialist Crime side of that Directorate placed under the new Frontline Policing Directorate. The group is currently led by Acting Assistant Commissioner Ade Adelekan.

It consists of several branches:

- Met Ops Chief Officer Team (MO1)
- Met Intelligence (MO2)
- Covert Policing (MO3)
- Forensic Services (MO4)
- Covert Governance (MO5)
- Public Order Planning (MO6)
- Taskforce (MO7)
  - Territorial Support Group
  - Marine Policing Unit
  - Dog Support Unit
  - Mounted Branch
  - Taskforce Surge Team
- Roads and Transport Policing Command (MO8)
- Met Detention (MO9)
- Met Prosecutions (MO10)
- Operational Support Services (MO11)
- MetCC (Met Contact Centre) (MO12)
- Specialist Firearms Command (MO19)
