= Roads and Transport Policing Command =

The Roads and Transport Policing Command (RTPC – codenamed MO8) is a unit of the Metropolitan Police Service that is responsible for policing roads, buses, bus routes, taxis and minicabs. It was formed from two separate Commands: Safer Transport Command and Traffic Operational Command Unit (OCU). The OCU is staffed by regular officers and has its own special constables, who work alongside regular officers in all areas of the command.

Both branches operate independently, and perform different roles, but they share a leadership team. The RTPC does not police national railways in London, London Underground, Docklands Light Railway or Tramlink, which fall under the remit of the British Transport Police (BTP).

The unit maintains a joint command and control centre with London Buses called MetroComm, which is also the command and control centre of the Traffic Operational Command Unit.

In response to a survey conducted by Transport for London (TFL), which showed that 15% of women using public transport in London had been the subject of some form of unwanted sexual behaviour but that 90% of incidents went unreported, the Safer Transport Command – in conjunction with the BTP, City of London Police, and TfL – launched Project Guardian, which aimed to reduce sexual offences and increase reporting.

== Operational history ==
Safer Transport Command was formed in 2002 as a joint venture with TfL, and consolidated several existing policing operations. It was known as the Transport OCU. On 1 April 2009, Transport OCU became part of Territorial Policing. On 29 September 2009, Transport OCU became known as the Safer Transport Command.

On 1 December 2014, the Safer Transport Command and the Traffic Operational Command Unit were merged to create the Roads & Transport Policing Command (RTPC). RTPC provides the MPS with a single, combined command unit responsible for policing the capital's roads and transport network.

In July 2026, it was reported that the Metropolitan Police were planning to disband RTPC, primarily as a cost-saving measure.

== Operational bases ==
There are four operational bases:

• North Garage (TDQ) located in Alperton, Athlon Road, Wembley, HA0 1EW;

• East Garage (TDJ) located in Chadwell Heath, 11 Grove Road, Romford, RM6 4AG;

• South Garage (TDP) located in Catford, Aitken Road, London, SE6 3BG; and

• West Garage (TDV) located in Merton, 15 Deer Park Road, Merton, SW19 3YX.
