= Basic command unit =

Largest unit into which territorial British Police forces are divided

A Basic Command Unit (BCU) is the largest unit into which territorial British Police forces are divided. BCU replaces the earlier terms Sub-Division and Division that had been in use since the 1880s. BCUs may alternatively be called an Area Command or a Division. They will also contain smaller, more local teams which are often called a Local Policing Unit (LPU) or a Local Policing Team (LPT). There are 228 BCUs (or equivalent units) in England and Wales.

Most forces are divided into at least three BCUs and some have many more. Most BCUs are further subdivided into smaller units. The BCU is usually commanded by a Chief Superintendent.

== Metropolitan Police ==
Until recently the Metropolitan Police used the term Borough Operational Command Unit (BOCU) for regional units within Frontline Policing (previously known as Territorial Policing), the subdivision of the Met responsible for day-to-day policing within the 32 London boroughs.

Between 2017 and 2019 the 32 BOCUs were reorganised to form 12 new Basic Command Units, each incorporating between two and four of the original BOCUs (see the article on Collar numbers).

The term Operational Command Unit (OCU) is used for specialised units, for example the Aviation Security OCU.

== West Midlands Police ==
West Midlands Police is split into 10 Local Policing Units (LPUs). Each LPU is in turn organized into four Core Policing Teams (CPTs) that manage its different core functions: Investigation, Neighbourhood, Response and Community Action and Priority Team (CAPT).

== Warwickshire Police ==
Warwickshire Police has abolished BCUs, the first British territorial police force to do so. The force is now divided directly into five Districts, each headed by a Chief Inspector. These were formerly grouped into two Areas (BCUs), North and South, each headed by a Chief Superintendent.
