= Territorial Support Group =

Specialist public-order unit of the Metropolitan Police

- Active: 1987–present
- Country: United Kingdom
- Branch: Specialist Crime & Operations
- Type: Police
- Role: CBRN defence; Counterterrorism; Law enforcement; Public-order crime
- Part of: Metropolitan Police Service – MO7 Taskforce
- Nickname: TSG

Commanders
- Current commander: Chief Superintendent Colin Wingrove

Insignia
- Identification symbol: "U" on shoulder number

The Territorial Support Group (TSG) is a Met Operations unit of London's Metropolitan Police Service (MPS) which focuses on public-order policing and other specialist areas. In 2012 it consisted of 793 officers and 29 support staff. The TSG is a uniformed unit of the MPS that replaced the similarly constituted Special Patrol Group in 1987. TSG units patrol London in marked police vans or "carriers", using the call sign prefix "Uniform". Generally, each carrier has an advanced (police) driver, six constables, and a sergeant. Territorial Support Group "serials" often comprise three carriers, twenty-one constables, and three sergeants reporting to an inspector. They separately patrol designated areas experiencing serious levels of gang violence or disorder. When deployed, a group is managed by the MPS Information Room. Due to the public-order nature of their role, a number of carriers will often be assigned to a specific event. TSG officers can be identified from the distinctive "U" on their epaulettes. Some TSG officers are also plainclothes officers, who carry tasers and handcuffs.

== Role ==
Today the TSG has three main tasks in the policing of the Metropolitan Police District:

- Securing the capital against terrorism.
- Responding to disorder anywhere within London.
- Reducing priority crime through borough support.

=== Public order ===
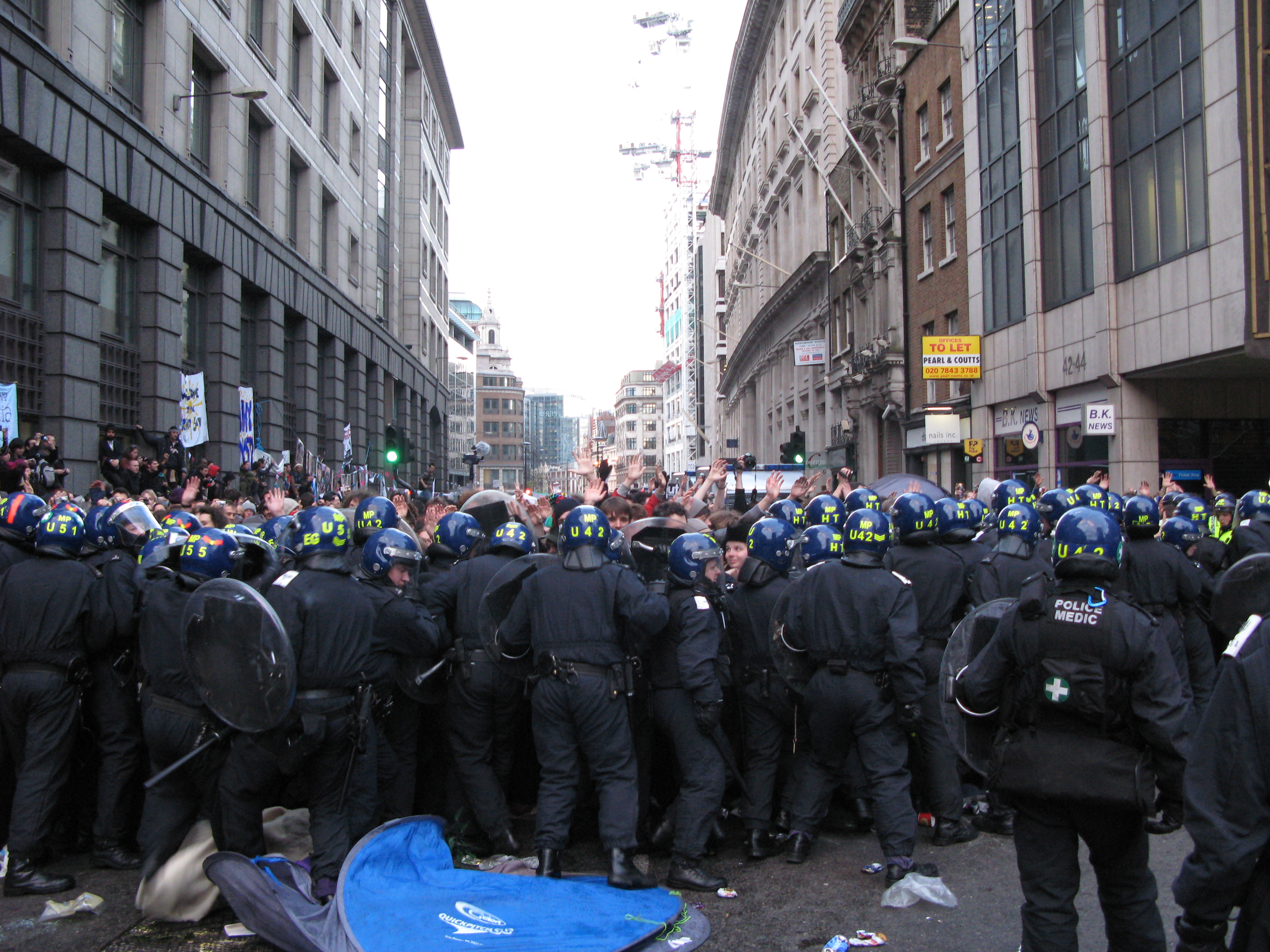
TSG officers in 2009. (Note the "U" on the helmet to distinguish from other riot officers.)

Although public order is not the TSG's only role, it is certainly their most visible and well-known. Like most police support unit vehicles, TSG vans are equipped with mesh window shields and officers are equipped with acrylic glass riot shields, visored 'NATO' helmets, shin and elbow guards, along with fireproof coveralls when required. This level of protection allows them to deal with many violent situations, including riots, football violence, and suspects armed with a variety of weapons. TSG officers are trained to a higher standard of operational readiness in their public-order role than most other police support units in London; TSG training is refreshed every five weeks as a matter of routine. Exercises are conducted predominantly at the MPS Specialist Training Centre in Gravesend, Kent, though other sites are used as required, and encompass all public-order scenarios. Officers undergo extensive riot training including being petrol bombed in large-scale engagements, prison clearance tactics, football stadium scenarios, night club scenarios, aircraft, rail and various "angry-man" scenarios, as well as additional specialist training. TSG units spend considerable time training with other specialist police teams as well as certain military units. Also, if a siege situation is present, but firearms are not involved, TSG will often be deployed to counter the threat. Reflecting this role the unit's former head, Commander Michael Johnson, was tactical commander for the London 2012 Olympics.

=== Borough support ===
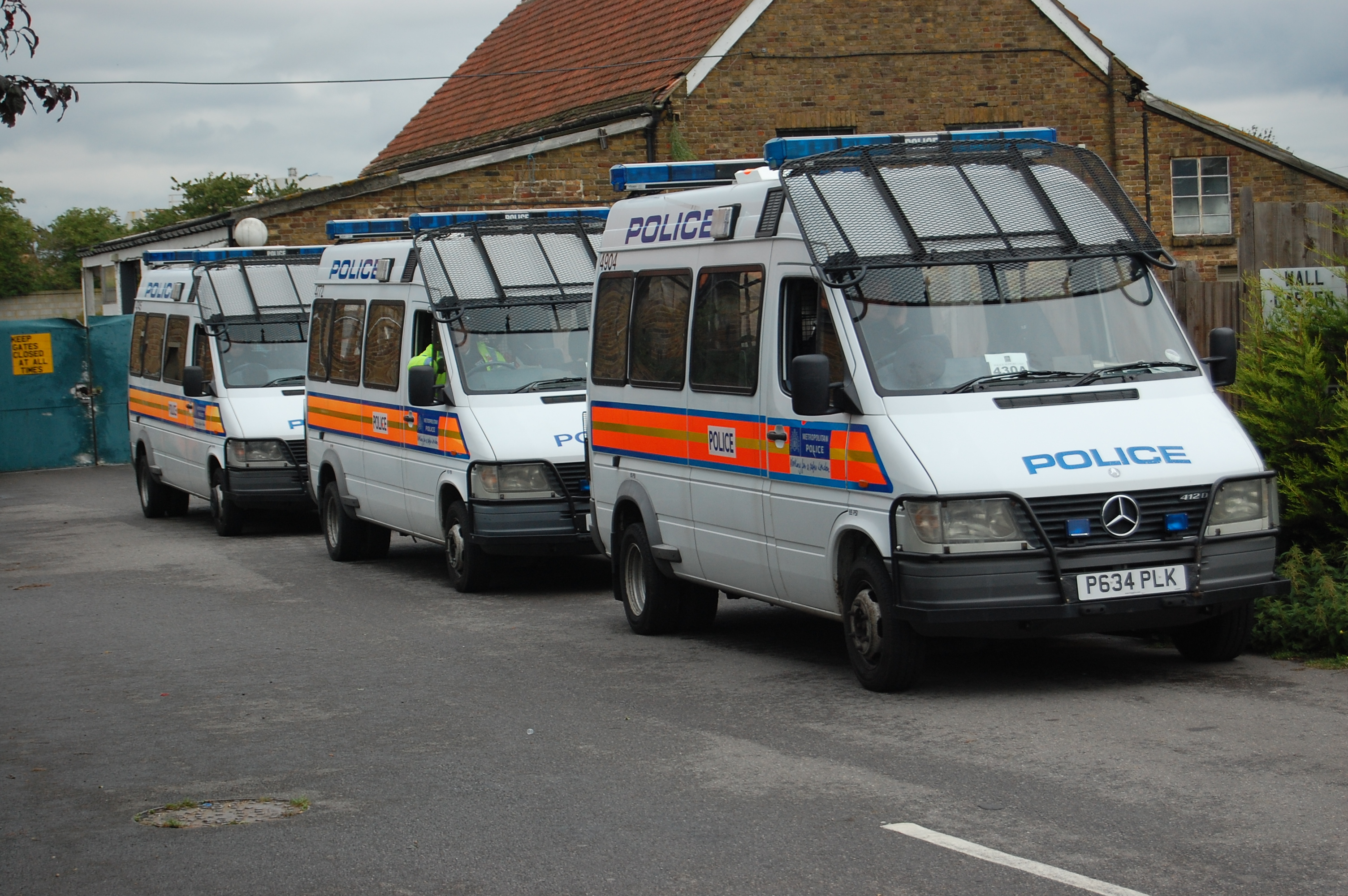
TSG Mercedes Sprinters; these models were phased out after the London Riots in 2011.

TSG provides support to regular divisional officers through high-visibility patrols, surveillance and decoy operations while also providing a presence on the streets. Boroughs are also supported through the provision of a "Commissioner's Reserve", a section of TSG that is on standby all year round. The Commissioner's Reserve is designed so such units are always available for rapid response of a sizeable number of officers anywhere within the metropolis to quell public-order problems, from a bar brawl to large-scale public disorder and public protest. On a day-to-day basis, TSG assists the boroughs in handling and relocating particularly violent prisoners.

=== Terrorism response ===
Whilst the majority of TSG officers are unarmed, and therefore do not engage in the initial confrontation of terrorists, the TSG is equipped and trained to deal with the aftermath or evacuation during or after a terrorism emergency in London, and the unit includes a CBRN (chemical, biological, radiological, nuclear) trained team. Working closely with SO15 (the Metropolitan Police Counter Terrorism Command) TSG also has counterterrorism responsibilities. 200 TSG officers are now trained as firearms officers, and are available to be called upon in the event of a major attack.

== Recruitment ==
Potential TSG candidates are selected from mainstream divisional officers. Officers are selected on merit and much emphasis is placed upon their personal policing ability, motivation, resilience and good communication skills. Fitness and stamina are also seen as essential attributes of TSG personnel. Applicants must be recommended by a senior officer (minimum rank of Inspector) whilst on division.

== Equipment ==
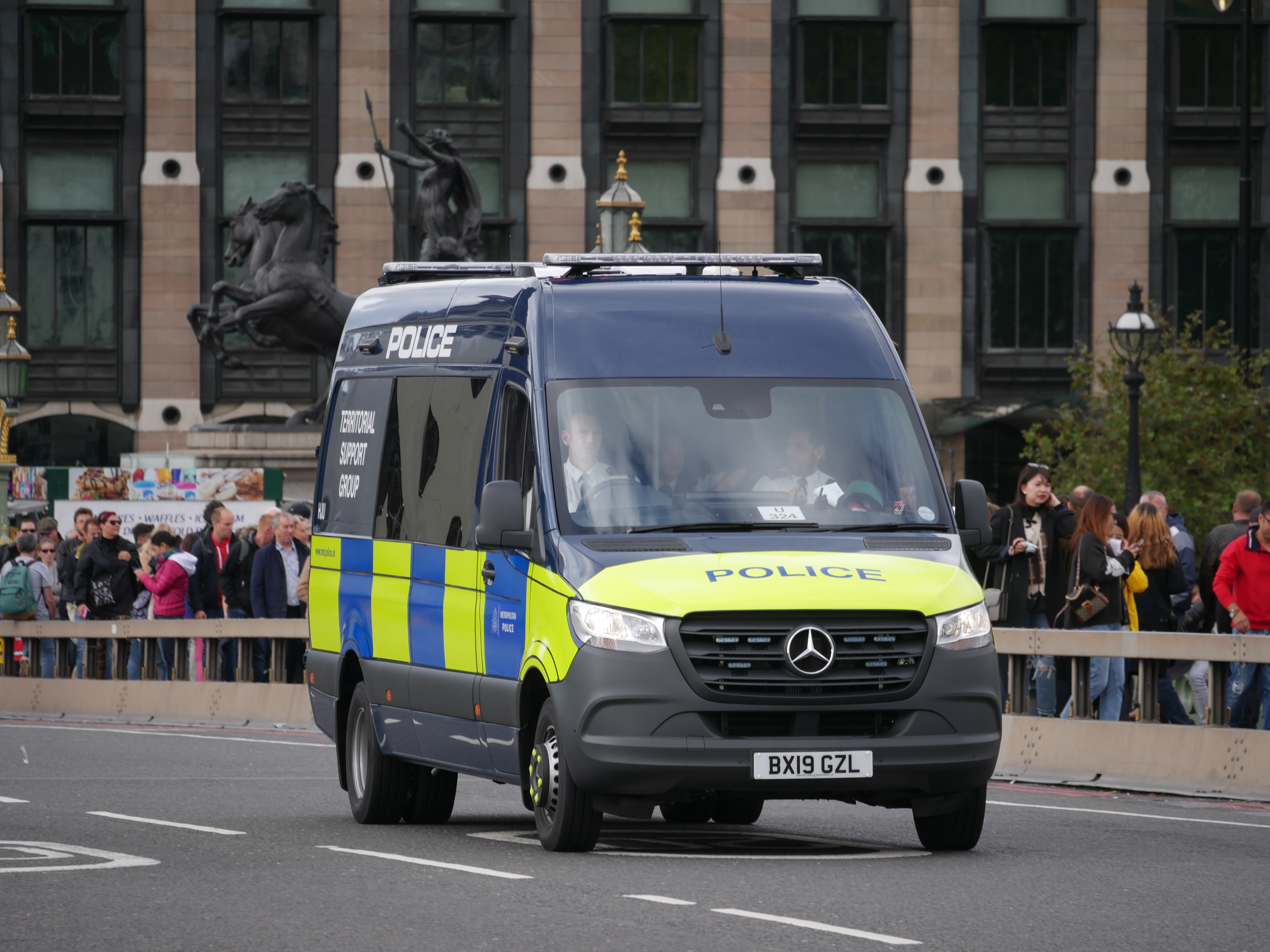
TSG Public-Order Vehicle (Carrier)

Large police vans are the standard vehicle of TSG and each van transports six constables and a sergeant. Three of these vans can form an operational Serial ready to respond to incidents; following the national PSU model, this would include an inspector, three sergeants, eighteen constables, two medics and three drivers. The TSG also maintains a fleet of armoured Ford F450 based Jankel Guardians for use in serious public-order situations, like the 2011 England riots. These are identical to, and interchangeable with, the Guardians used by SCO18 Aviation Command and SCO19 Firearms Command, but do not carry armed officers in public-order situations.

TSG officers are not routinely armed, but are equipped with speedcuffs, fixed batons and CS/PAVA incapacitant spray like all officers. TSG does, however, have its own firearms capability with some officers being trained as Authorised Firearms Officers (AFOs). These officers may conduct certain infrequent armed patrols across London, typically in response to a threat of terrorism.

Instead of TSG officers wearing standard black trousers and white shirt, when policing demonstrations they often wear fire-retardant overalls with their stab vests underneath.

Officer Identification
Officer Position	Corresponding Epaulette
TSG Constable	
Public-Order Medic	
TSG Sergeant	
TSG Inspector	
TSG Chief Inspector	
TSG Superintendent	
TSG Chief Superintendent	

== Bases of operations ==
The TSG operates from four bases located around London:

- 2TSG, Athlon Road, Alperton
- 3TSG, Grove Road, Chadwell Heath
- 4TSG, Aitken Road, Catford
- 5TSG, Larkhall Lane, Clapham

The 1TSG unit based in Paddington Green Police Station was decommissioned in 2016 relating to poor working practices, unauthorised claiming of overtime and bullying.

=== List of known commanding officers ===
- Michael "Mick" Johnson (2007–2011)
- Chief Superintendent Mark Bird (2011)
- Chief Superintendent Colin Wingrove (2025)

== TSG senior command team ==
The Met’s TSF leadership team contains;

- 1× assistant commissioner (Pippa Mills - oversees Met operations)

- 1× chief superintendent (Colin Wingrove)

- 1× superintendent

- 4× chief inspector (NE, NW, SE, SW TSG)

- 1× chief inspector based at HQ.

== Criticism ==
The TSG and its predecessor, the SPG, has been likened to paramilitary units during riot control operations by Tony Jefferson in The Case against Paramilitary Policing (1990). He argued this because of their use of shields, batons and helmets, their centralised command structure, their willingness to use force, and their squad-like formations. Peter Waddington, who has been credited with developing kettling, countered this conclusion in The British Journal of Criminology by pointing out that their equipment is mainly defensive. As employees, the police force has a duty to protect them from harm; he further notes that paramedics in riot situations also wear similar helmets and armour. Jefferson argues that by the police preparing for an event, such as a march or protest where they expect there to be violence, they create a self-fulfilling prophecy and that violence will occur. Waddington responds to this by pointing out that the TSG were deployed at the Notting Hill Carnival every year and yet there was not always violence. Jefferson also believes that by controlling the ground the TSG incites violence. Waddington cites examples (including the Battle of the Beanfield) where problems were caused by the police not controlling the ground and that when they have then tried to gain control violence ensued.

Waddington argued that if the presence of the TSG caused violence, then violence would not occur if they were not deployed. Waddington uses examples from three Poll Tax Riots to illustrate that the assumption that their deployment causes violence is not correct. When the TSG was not deployed, serious disorder occurred, including a fully-fledged riot. In contrast, when the TSG, including specialists in riot control, was deployed, there was less violence. What is more, he found that the more the police planned for the 'worst-case scenario' the less disorder there was. When they controlled the space and the crowd was at its greatest, violence was lowest. Waddington states that whilst the deployment of the TSG in a riot situation is never desirable, it is often essential to maintain order and limit violence. However, he also believes that the use of force should be as minimal as possible and that it should only be used to achieve publicly acceptable purposes.

Officers in the TSG have faced criticism about their policing methods and complaints have been made against officers of the TSG. Senior officers say that the type of work that the TSG are involved with, policing protests and performing drug raids makes them more likely to have complaints made against them. As the result of a freedom of information request made by The Guardian newspaper, it was revealed that more than 5,000 complaints were made against the TSG in 4 years but only 9 have been upheld. Commenting on these figures, a member of the Metropolitan Police Authority stated that officers in the TSG are "practically immune" from criticism.

One ex-Metropolitan Police officer suggested that TSG members "spend [their] days waiting for action, and far too many officers join seeking excitement and physical confrontation." Some officers are ex-military personnel and these are "the worst bullies" as "the laws of the battlefield are not appropriate to the streets of our capital".

=== Incidents ===
In 1997, a man was beaten by officers from the TSG in what was described as an "outrageous display of brutality", which only stopped when the man pretended to be unconscious. The man was charged with assault and threatening behaviour over the incident but was cleared after photographs of his injuries showed the officers had lied about the case under oath. After the man's acquittal the officers went on trial accused of assault in 1999 but were later cleared. In 2003, six officers of the TSG performed what a judge in 2009 called a "serious, gratuitous and prolonged" assault and "religious abuse" on suspect Babar Ahmad, a 34-year-old IT support analyst who was not subsequently charged with any offence. The officers involved had already been the subject of as many as 60 complaints about unwarranted assaults against other men. A number of mail sacks containing these complaints were somehow lost. The accusations were investigated by the Independent Police Complaints Commission (IPCC) but that they were found to be unsubstantiated. Five of the six officers were still members of the TSG in 2009. Babar Ahmed was later awarded £60,000 compensation, by the High Court, for the assault. In August 2009, it was announced that the police officers accused of attacking Babar Ahmad would face criminal charges. However, all four officers were found not guilty in June 2011 after a recording from a listening device placed in Mr. Ahmed's home surfaced shortly before the trial, which "proved the account originally given by these officers was correct and specific details of the complaint made by Mr. Ahmad were not present".

In 2005 a Kurdish youth recorded an officer on his mobile phone, telling him: "If you say one more fucking word, I'll smash your fucking Arab face in.", after he was stopped near Paddington Green police station. The officer was suspended but denied the charge.

Another investigation into six other officers of the TSG by the IPCC was launched following allegations made by three men that they were racially abused during an incident during June 2007 in Paddington. A van of officers stopped after seeing youths mouthing obscenities towards them. The officers appeared in court in December 2008 and were prosecuted: two for racially abusing the men, four of misconduct in a public office and one of racially aggravated assault. The Guardian reported that a request may have been made to restrict reporting of the trial by the media. The officer who was driving the van acted as a whistleblower during the trial. One officer, a former Royal Marine, accused in this case was also involved in the assault of Babar Ahmed and has had 31 complaints lodged against him since 1993. In November 2009, he was cleared of all offences, along with the other officers, and returned to work with the TSG.

During the 2009 G-20 London summit protests two officers of the TSG were suspended from duty following publication of videos which recorded alleged assaults on members of the public at the 2009 G-20 London summit protests and at a subsequent memorial. In the first case, the member of the public, Ian Tomlinson, died shortly afterwards. In the second case, Sgt Delroy (Tony) Smellie was seen hitting Nicola Fisher. Following her complaint, the Crown Prosecution Service announced in September 2009, that there was sufficient evidence to charge Sgt Smellie with assault. He appeared in court on 16 November 2009 and was cleared of assault charges on 31 March 2010 at City of Westminster Magistrates' Court. However, it was reported that he could still face misconduct proceedings over the incident. Video evidence showed that the officer seen hitting Ian Tomlinson had his face covered, and that the officers involved in both cases were not displaying their identification numbers. Following the investigation into police handling of the protest, the human rights group Liberty called for further study of what it referred to as the "militaristic approach" used by the TSG.
