= Stephen House =

British police officer (born 1957)

Sir Stephen House QPM
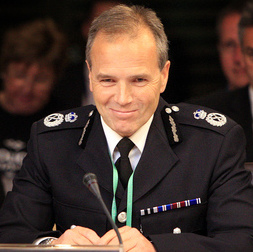
- House in 2012

Commissioner of Police of the Metropolis
- Acting; 10 April 2022 – 12 September 2022
- Monarch: Elizabeth II; Charles III
- Deputy: Helen Ball (Acting)
- Home Secretary: Priti Patel; Suella Braverman
- Mayor: Sadiq Khan
- Preceded by: Cressida Dick
- Succeeded by: Mark Rowley

Deputy Commissioner of Police of the Metropolis
- In office 1 December 2018 – April 2022
- Commissioner: Cressida Dick
- Preceded by: Craig Mackey
- Succeeded by: Helen Ball (Acting)

Assistant Commissioner for Met Operations
- In office 1 January 2018 – 1 December 2018
- Preceded by: Office created
- Succeeded by: Nick Ephgrave

Chief Constable of the Police Service of Scotland
- In office 1 October 2012 – 30 November 2015
- Preceded by: Office created
- Succeeded by: Phil Gormley

Chief Constable of the Strathclyde Police
- In office 30 November 2007 – 1 October 2012
- Preceded by: Willie Rae
- Succeeded by: Campbell Corrigan

Personal details
- Born: 1957 (age 68–69) Glasgow, Scotland
- Education: University of Aberdeen
- Profession: Police officer

Sir Stephen House QPM (born 1957) is a Scottish police officer who served as Acting Commissioner of the Metropolitan Police in 2022. After beginning his career at Sussex Police in 1981, House held positions in Northamptonshire Police and West Yorkshire Police, then became Assistant Chief Constable of Staffordshire Police in 1998. In 2001, he joined the Metropolitan Police as a Deputy Assistant Commissioner, remaining there until 2007, when he was appointed Chief Constable of Strathclyde Police.

Following the establishment of Police Scotland in 2012, House was appointed the new force's first chief constable, but stood down in 2015 following a series of controversies. In 2018 House returned to the Metropolitan Police as an Assistant Commissioner, becoming Deputy Commissioner to Cressida Dick later that year. After Dick left office in April 2022, House was Acting Commissioner of the Metropolitan Police until September 2022. From September 2022 he led a review of operational productivity in policing at the National Police Chiefs' Council, a position he left in March 2023 after being referred to the Independent Office for Police Conduct in relation to alleged comments about rape allegations.

== Early life ==
House was born in Glasgow in 1957 and attended the independent Kelvinside Academy. When he was 11, his family moved to London, where he continued to be privately educated in Hampstead. His father, William, worked for the Imperial Cancer Research Fund, while his mother, Alice, worked in a laboratory before becoming a full-time parent to her children. He has a younger brother, Jon, who was also a senior police officer and was later chief executive of Cardiff Council. House returned to Scotland in 1976, to study History and English Literature at the University of Aberdeen.

== Career ==
=== Early police career ===
House joined Sussex Police in 1981. He cites his experiences of the police in Aberdeen during his time as a student there, as well as a desire for a role in a disciplined, hierarchical environment, and a view of the police as "a sort of secret, closed-off society", as part of his initial motivation for becoming a police officer. While at Sussex Police he was part of operations responding to the Brighton hotel bombing of 1984 and the miners' strike of 1984–85.

He later described himself as not "particularly good" and "a bit too judgmental" as an officer on the beat, and said he lacked maturity and empathy in his early career. He transferred in 1988 to Northamptonshire Police, where he was promoted to Sergeant, then progressed to Chief Inspector before moving in 1994 to West Yorkshire Police where he worked as a Superintendent. He became Assistant Chief Constable of Staffordshire Police in 1998.

=== Metropolitan Police Service (2001–2007) ===
House joined the Metropolitan Police in December 2001, as a Deputy Assistant Commissioner working in Policy Reviews and Standards. In early 2003, he moved to Territorial Policing, where he was appointed Assistant Commissioner of the Central Operations Branch. In 2006, as Commander of the Specialist Crime Directorate, he had responsibility for areas including child abuse, economic crime, the Flying Squad, forensics, gun crime, homicide, undercover policing and the disruption of criminal networks.

=== Strathclyde Police (2007–2012) ===
House was appointed as Chief constable of Strathclyde Police in 2007 and joined the force formally in November that year, succeeding Willie Rae, the retiring Chief Constable.

In 2011, while in post at Strathclyde, and after being contacted by Home Office officials, House applied to become the Commissioner of Police of the Metropolis following the resignation of Paul Stephenson. Bernard Hogan-Howe was eventually appointed to the post.

House acknowledged that he was disappointed at being unsuccessful in his application. He was quoted as saying "You don't put yourself forward for a job like that lightly, and unfortunately you do it in the full glare of publicity, so it was a pretty difficult situation".

=== Police Scotland (2012–2015) ===
House was appointed Chief Constable of Police Scotland in September 2012 and took up the position when the new force, which replaced Scotland's eight regional forces, was formally established in April 2013. He had previously called for the creation of such a national force. Justice Secretary Kenny MacAskill said House would be "outstanding" in the position and said he had an "impressive track record of leadership, partnership working and delivery". In an interview conducted soon after he was sworn in, he argued it was necessary for police officers "to have a strong sense of morality" and said responding to domestic abuse and organised crime would be priorities.

Soon after taking office, House ordered a series of raids targeting saunas and massage parlours, which he suspected were fronts for money laundering and sex work. A number of people in Edinburgh were charged with brothel keeping and living off immoral earnings, but the prosecutions collapsed due to the existence of a 1986 agreement between politicians, police and the Crown Office and Procurator Fiscal Service, made in order to slow the spread of HIV/AIDS, which permitted sex work in saunas with the requirement they supplied condoms and promoted safe sex.

In November 2013, House took up the role of Patron of the national police charity the Police Roll of Honour Trust, alongside Bernard Hogan-Howe and Hugh Orde.

In 2014 House authorised the deployment of armed police in Scotland. He cited the 1996 Dunblane massacre as a reason for the policy. His tenure also saw an investigation into Police Scotland officers over the death of Sheku Bayoh after being restrained in May 2015. In March 2023, a BBC analysis of Police Scotland documents found that, during House's tenure, the force falsely claimed that thousands of 999 calls had been allocated to officers in order to artificially improve recorded response rates.

House said in 2013 that he would not seek another police position after the end of his Police Scotland contract in 2016. In August 2015 House announced he would stand down from the post in three months. His resignation followed a series of controversies and failures, including his force's failure to rescue a woman who died after being left in a crashed vehicle for three days, his decision to place armed officers on routine street patrols, and his decision to stop and search tens of thousands of people who were not suspected of a crime. He had previously resisted calls to resign and received the backing of First Minister Nicola Sturgeon. His last day in the job was 30 November 2015. His replacement was Phil Gormley.

=== Metropolitan Police Deputy Commissioner (2018–2022) ===
In February 2018 House was re-appointed as an Assistant Commissioner. On 5 October 2018, he was announced by the Government as the new Deputy Commissioner of the Metropolitan Police Service, a post he took up in December 2018 following the retirement of Craig Mackey.

In July 2020, in an appearance before the London Assembly's police and crime committee, House defended the police officers who stopped, searched and handcuffed the athlete Bianca Williams earlier that month and the officers who fired a stun gun at an elderly man in his own home the previous month. House said the officers involved had been treated unfairly and that widely shared videos of each event failed to present a "full picture". While House claimed that the Independent Office for Police Conduct (IOPC) had exonerated the officers in the latter case, the IOPC said it had not considered the case.

In a September 2020 appearance before the committee, House criticised Extinction Rebellion protesters for "going floppy" when arrested, a tactic he described as a "flipping nuisance" and called to be outlawed.

In February 2021, House said the Metropolitan Police would continue to disproportionately stop and search black people and that the public ought not to be concerned about this behaviour. House said stop and search was concentrated in areas believed to suffer from "real problems with violence" and that ceasing to disproportionately target black people would require police officers to stop and search elderly people. In March 2021, after submitting written evidence to an Investigatory Powers Tribunal complaint relating to the activities of the undercover police officer Mark Kennedy, House said he was too busy to be cross-examined on his evidence. In the same month, after Metropolitan Police officers broke up a vigil following the murder of Sarah Everard and the arrest of a Metropolitan Police officer for her murder, House declined to apologise and described the vigil prior to the police intervention as a "very, very hostile situation".

In June 2021, House joined with Metropolitan Police Commissioner Cressida Dick in rejecting the conclusions of an independent inquiry into the 1987 murder of Daniel Morgan, which found the force to have been institutionally corrupt in concealing or denying failings in its investigations. In July 2021, House expressed scepticism over the proposal, supported by the government and pledged in Mayor of London Sadiq Khan's manifesto, that the Metropolitan Police record gender-based hate crimes.

Following Dick's resignation in February 2022, House criticised Khan for his role in Dick's departure, arguing that due process had not been followed and calling for Home Secretary Priti Patel to review Khan's treatment of Dick. Patel later ordered a review, to be led by Tom Winsor, to examine whether the Mayor of London's role in hiring and dismissing the Metropolitan Police Commissioner should be reduced. House was identified by LBC and Sky News as a potential successor to Dick. The Liberal Democrat MP Alistair Carmichael called for House to be ruled out as a replacement for Dick on the basis of his record with Police Scotland. House did not ultimately apply for the position. In March 2022, a group of prominent black people wrote to House to call for immediate action to be taken against Metropolitan Police officers who strip-searched a child at her school.

In April 2022, Patel announced House would serve as Acting Commissioner of the Metropolitan Police pending the appointment of a successor to Cressida Dick. Announcing his appointment, Patel said House would "provide the stability and continuity the force needs". Following Patel's announcement, Liberal Democrat MP Wendy Chamberlain wrote to Patel arguing that House was unsuitable for the position due to his record with Police Scotland, while Liberal Democrat London Assembly Member Caroline Pidgeon wrote to Khan to seek assurances regarding House's stop and search policy at Police Scotland.

=== Acting Metropolitan Police Commissioner (2022) ===
House became Commissioner on the resignation of Cressida Dick on 10 April 2022. In his first appearance before the Home Affairs Select Committee on 20 April, House said "unacceptable behaviour" in the Metropolitan Police, particularly in its Parliamentary and Diplomatic Protection unit, was not attributable to "a few bad apples", and called for a change to protocol that would allow officers suspected of misconduct to be dismissed more quickly. In April 2022, after five officers were referred to disciplinary hearings for gross misconduct for stopping and searching the athlete Bianca Williams in July 2020, the Independent Office for Police Conduct said the Metropolitan Police should consider apologising for House's earlier defence of the officers. The force issued a statement declaring that House would stand by his own earlier statement, in which he described the officers' behaviour as lawful and justified.

In May 2022, Nazir Afzal, the former chief prosecutor for north-west England, criticised House's handling of the Partygate scandal relating to breaches of COVID-19 restrictions by government figures, describing the approach as lacking transparency. Also in May, Mayor of London Sadiq Khan wrote to House to demand he explain why Boris Johnson did not receive a fixed penalty notice (FPN) for attending a party in November 2020, in relation to which other attendees were fined, and said that public trust in the Metropolitan Police had been eroded by a "lack of clarity" in its decision-making in Operation Hillman. Appearing before the London Assembly's police and crime committee later in May, House said that while Johnson had attended events for which others were fined, there had been insufficient evidence to issue more than one FPN to him.

Later in May 2022, chiefs of nine police forces near London wrote to House to protest the Metropolitan Police's policy of offering "golden hellos" to officers recruited from other forces, which they argued would have a "hugely disproportionate and negative effect" on their own forces and were likely to be unlawful. Hampshire Police and Crime Commissioner Donna Jones said the policy was "masking ... the fact that people don't want to work for the Met police because of the culture issues and the failings that they have had".

In June 2022, after the Metropolitan Police was placed in special measures by Her Majesty's Inspectorate of Constabulary and Fire & Rescue Services, Inspector of Constabulary Matt Parr wrote to House to outline "substantial and persistent concerns" regarding the force's performance, including its "inexperienced" workforce, its backlog of online child abuse cases, the stop-and-search of Bianca Williams, the strip-searching of children, the murder of Sarah Everard, and the force's approach to internal corruption. In July 2022, Mark Rowley was announced as Dick's successor as permanent Commissioner.

=== Productivity review (2022–2023) ===
In September 2022, House left the Metropolitan Police in order to lead a review of operational productivity in policing, which was overseen by the National Police Chiefs' Council. The initial focus of the review was on mental health in police forces.

In March 2023, Betsy Stanko, a researcher who led a review that intended to increase prosecution rates for rape cases, alleged that House had said in a 2022 meeting that the majority of rape allegations were made in cases of "regretful sex". In response to the allegation, House was referred to the Independent Office for Police Conduct. House also stood down from the productivity review. House denied the allegations and said he welcomed the IOPC's investigation. In March 2024, the IOPC concluded its investigation, which it said had found no indication House had breached behavioural standards.

== Personal life ==
House has been married since 1987, and has three children, a boy and two girls. He has few interests outside of his family and his job, although he enjoys hill walking and science fiction. He was known to turn up unannounced at police stations on a motorcycle when he was Chief Constable of Strathclyde Police. House is not religious.

== Honours ==
House was awarded the Queen's Police Medal in 2005 for distinguished service. He was knighted in the 2013 Birthday Honours for services to law and order.

Ribbon	Description	Notes
	Knight Bachelor	2013 Queen's Birthday Honours List
	Queen's Police Medal (QPM)	For Distinguished Service; 2005

Police appointments
Preceded by	Metropolitan Police Service; Assistant Commissioner (Central Operations); 2005–2006	Succeeded by Tarique Ghaffur
Preceded by Tarique Ghaffur	Metropolitan Police Service; Assistant Commissioner (Specialist Crime); 2006–2007	Succeeded by John Yates
Preceded by Willie Rae	Chief Constable of Strathclyde Police; 2007–2012	Succeeded by Campbell Corrigan
New title	Chief Constable of Police Service of Scotland; 2012–2015	Succeeded by Phil Gormley
Preceded by Pat Gallan as Assistant Commissioner for Specialist Crime and Operations	Metropolitan Police Service; Assistant Commissioner (Met Operations); 2018–2018	Succeeded by Nick Ephgrave
Preceded by Cressida Dick	Deputy Commissioner of Police of the Metropolis; 2018–2022	Succeeded by Lynne Owens (acting)
Preceded by Cressida Dick	Commissioner of Police of the Metropolis (Acting); 2022	Succeeded by Mark Rowley
