= Lynne Owens =

British police officer (born 1969)

Dame Lynne Owens DCB CBE QPM DL
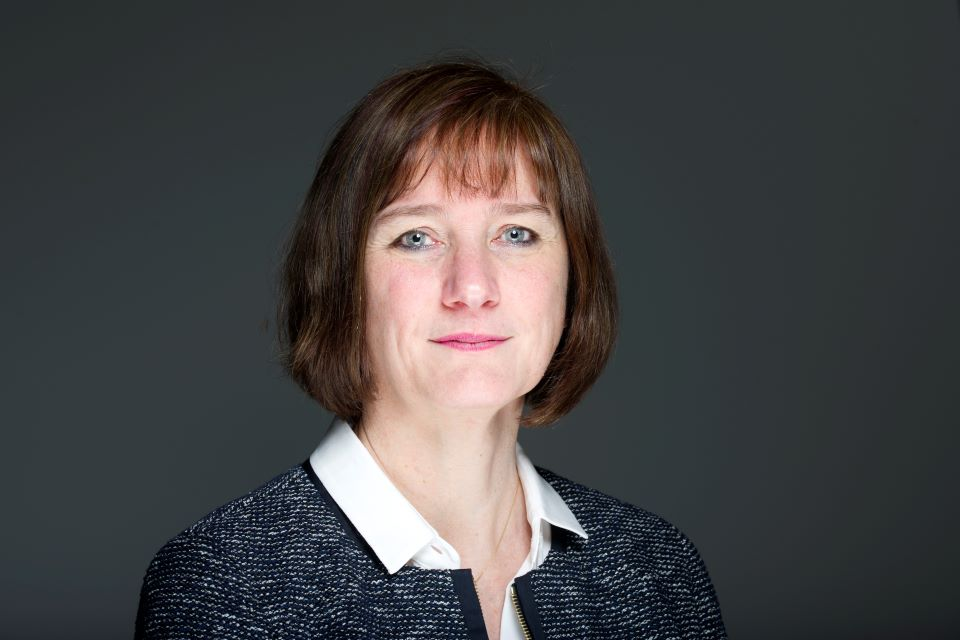
- Owens in 2016

Deputy Commissioner of Police of the Metropolis
- In office 20 February 2023 – May 2025; Interim: September 2022 – February 2023
- Commissioner: Sir Mark Rowley
- Preceded by: Stephen House / Helen Ball (acting) / Lynne Owens (interim)
- Succeeded by: Matt Jukes

Director General of the National Crime Agency
- In office 4 January 2016 – 4 October 2021
- Preceded by: Keith Bristow
- Succeeded by: Graeme Biggar

Chief Constable of Surrey Police
- In office February 2012 – December 2015
- Preceded by: Mark Rowley
- Succeeded by: Nick Ephgrave

Assistant Commissioner of Police of the Metropolis
- In office December 2010 – February 2012
- Preceded by: Chris Allison
- Succeeded by: Mark Rowley

Personal details
- Born: 29 January 1969 (age 57)
- Profession: Chief Police Officer
- Awards: Queen's Police Medal (2008); Commander of the Order of the British Empire (2015); Dame Commander of the Order of the Bath (2021)
- a. As First Deputy Director-General for Capabilities. b. As Second Deputy Director-General for Operations.

Dame Lynne Gillian Owens, DCB, CBE, QPM, DL (born 29 January 1969) is a retired senior police officer in the United Kingdom. She was made interim Deputy Commissioner of the Metropolitan Police Service in September 2022 before being confirmed as that role's permanent holder in February 2023, the first-ever such female holder (Helen Ball previously held it on an acting basis in 2021–2022). She retired from the role in May 2025.

She was Assistant Commissioner of Central Operations, then Central Operations and Specialist Crime, with the Metropolitan Police Service from 2010 to 2012, and the Chief Constable of Surrey Police from 2012 to 2015. She then served as Director-General of the National Crime Agency from 2016 to 2021, making her one of the most senior law enforcement chiefs in the United Kingdom at the time. In October 2025, she was appointed to lead an Independent Review into Releases in Error, following the release in error of Hadush Kebatu from HMP Chelmsford.

== Life ==
=== Early life and education ===
Owens was born on 29 January 1969. Her father, Edward Crew, was chief constable of West Midlands Police from 1996 to 2002. She studied at the University of Exeter, graduating with a Master of Arts (MA) degree in 2008.

=== Rise ===
Owens began her policing career when she joined the Metropolitan Police Service in 1989. As a Constable, she was based in Catford, London. On promotion to Sergeant, she transferred to Kent Police and began training to become a detective. In the rank of Detective Chief Inspector, she became a senior investigating officer with the force's major crime department.

In 2002, Owens transferred to Surrey Police. She was appointed Divisional Commander of North Surrey in May 2003. In January 2005, she was promoted to temporary assistant chief constable responsible for specialist operations. This was her first experience of a chief officer rank. She qualified as a Gold firearms Commander during that appointment. Having completed the Strategic Command Course run by the National Policing Improvement Agency, she was made assistant chief constable responsible for territorial operations. She became the youngest person to hold the rank of deputy chief constable when she was appointed to the rank temporarily in March 2008. During that appointment, she headed an organisational change programme.

=== DAC, AC and Chief Constable ===
In April 2009, Owens returned to the Metropolitan Police as a Deputy Assistant Commissioner. In that role she was responsible for operations within territorial policing. She was promoted to Assistant Commissioner in December 2010, becoming only the second woman to hold that rank in that service. In August 2011, she additionally became responsible for the Specialist Crime Directorate and became head of the Specialist Crime and Operations Directorate. She was overall commander of the policing for the wedding of Prince William and Catherine Middleton that took place in April 2011, and the state visit by US president Barack Obama in May 2011. She was also part of the Metropolitan Police's senior leadership team during the 2011 England riots, for whose handling they were heavily criticised.

In December 2011, Owens was selected to become the next Chief Constable of Surrey Police. She took up the appointment in February 2012, becoming the first woman to head the force. In December 2012, her contract was extended until November 2017 by Kevin Hurley, the Police and Crime Commissioner for Surrey Police. However, in a meeting in September 2015, Hurley revealed he had been considering her dismissal for a "failure of leadership" in relation to concerns about her record on child protection.

=== NCA and Deputy Commissioner ===
On 26 November 2015 it was announced that Owens would be the next head of the National Crime Agency. She replaced the outgoing Director-General and former Chief Constable of Warwickshire Police, Keith Bristow QPM, in January 2016. Upon taking up the appointment, she became the then most senior woman in British law enforcement. In September 2021 she announced that she would be retiring afrom that role on medical grounds. She was succeeded by Graeme Biggar on an interim basis.

She did not apply to succeed Cressida Dick as Commissioner of the Metropolitan Police, but in August 2022 Mark Rowley announced Owens would return to the Metropolitan Police on 12 September that year, holding a six-month post as Interim Deputy Commissioner whilst a permanent holder of that post was recruited at the start of Rowley's own commissionership. Her confirmation as the permanent holder of that role was announced on 20 February 2023. She announced on 25 February 2025 that she would retire in May that year.

== Honours ==
Owens was awarded the Queen's Police Medal (QPM) in the 2008 New Year Honours for distinguished service. She was appointed Commander of the Order of the British Empire (CBE) in the 2015 Birthday Honours for services to policing and criminal justice. She was appointed Dame Commander of the Order of the Bath (DCB) in the 2021 New Year Honours for service to law enforcement. In February 2023, she was appointed as a deputy lieutenant of Surrey.

Police appointments
Preceded by Chris Allison	Assistant Commissioner (Central Operations); Metropolitan Police Service; 2010–2011	Appointment merged
New title	Assistant Commissioner (Specialist Crime and Operations); Metropolitan Police Service; 2011	Succeeded by Mark Rowley
Preceded by Mark Rowley	Chief Constable of Surrey Police; 2012–2016	Succeeded by Nick Ephgrave
Preceded by Keith Bristow	Director General of the National Crime Agency; 2016–2021	Succeeded by Graeme Biggar (acting)
Preceded by Stephen House / Helen Ball (acting)	Deputy Commissioner of Police of the Metropolis; 2022–2025	Succeeded by Matt Jukes (acting)
