= Tarique Ghaffur =

British police officer

Tarique Ghaffur CBE QPM
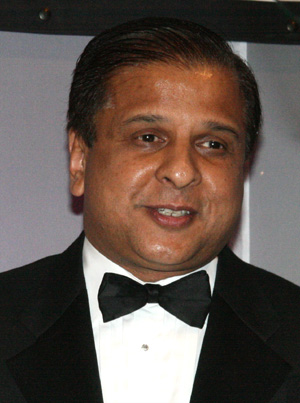
- Ghaffur pictured at the Asian Woman Awards in November 2007
- Born: 8 June 1958 (age 67); Jinja, Uganda
- Police career
- Department: Metropolitan Police Service
- Service years: 1974–2008
- Rank: Assistant Commissioner
- Awards: CBE; QPM

Tarique Ghaffur CBE QPM (/təˈriːk ɡæˈfʊər/; born 8 June 1958) is a former Ugandan-born British police officer in London's Metropolitan Police Service. His last post was as Assistant Commissioner–Central Operations.

== Biography ==
Born in Jinja, Uganda to Muslim Punjabi parents hailing from modern-day Pakistan in 1958, Ghaffur and his family emigrated to the United Kingdom in 1972 after President Idi Amin forcibly expelled most of the country's minority South Asian population. Ghaffur's parents had previously emigrated from British India's Punjab region to Uganda during the Partition of India in 1947. Tarique's family was taken to a resettlement camp in Staffordshire.

Two years later, in 1974, Ghaffur joined the newly formed Greater Manchester Police, where he worked in uniform and as a CID detective. One of only two police officers from a minority ethnic background out of a force of over 6,000, Ghaffur asserted that the desk sergeant on his first day with the police refused him admission to the station as he did not believe he was a police officer.

Ghaffur rose through the ranks at the GMP, reaching the rank of Superintendent and transferring to Leicestershire Constabulary in 1989. He was appointed Assistant Chief Constable in Lancashire Constabulary. After reaching the rank of Deputy Chief Constable at Lancashire, he transferred to the Metropolitan Police Service in 1999 as a Deputy Assistant Commissioner and in 2000 served as Borough Commander of the City of Westminster.

In 2001, he was promoted to Assistant Commissioner, and headed three of the Metropolitan Police's Operational Command Units: the Directorate of Performance, Review and Standards in 2001; the Specialist Crime Directorate from November 2002; and Central Operations from 2006.

In 2011 he was the dean of the London Community College of Education, a private college in London.

== Controversies ==
As the UK's highest-ranking Asian Muslim police officer, he often used his position to comment on issues of alleged racism in the police service, and on alleged discrimination against Muslims as a factor inciting radical Islam. In June 2008 he accused his own force of racism, claiming that, among other things, he was not properly consulted over the proposed law involving 42-day detentions for terror suspects. The MPS rejected the claim of racism and said it would "robustly challenge" Mr Ghaffur's claim at any employment tribunal.

In 2005 Tarique Ghaffur and Sir Ian Blair were involved in Operation Finnean, the investigation into supermodel Kate Moss's alleged possession and distribution of a Class A drug. It has been alleged that the operation was systematically sabotaged by officers eager to undermine Ghaffur and Blair's high-profile stance on celebrity drug taking, and thereby erode their authority.

On 28 August 2008, Ghaffur held a press conference at which he accused the Metropolitan Police Commissioner, Sir Ian Blair, of racism and discrimination, and confirmed speculation that he would take proceedings against Sir Ian and the MPS at an employment tribunal. In the following days, Ghaffur claimed, he received death threats which he claims to believe came (in part) from within the MPS. As a consequence he says he considered a leave of absence, and his lawyers hired a firm of private bodyguards to secure his safety. Although he has disclosed them in the media, Ghaffur has not reported these death threats to the police, claiming that he has lost faith in the ability and willingness of the police to protect him.

On 25 November 2008, the Metropolitan Police Authority confirmed that Tarique Ghaffur had agreed an out-of-court settlement for £300,000 in his racial discrimination claim against Scotland Yard. Both parties agreed to a confidentiality clause and Ghaffur retired from the Metropolitan Police on 27 November 2008.

== Awards ==
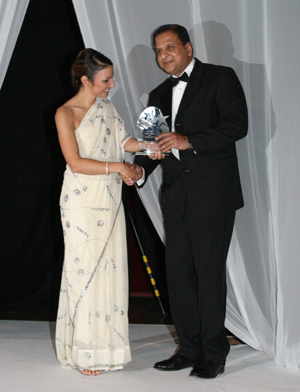
Ghaffur receiving the Asian Woman Magazine Lifetime achievement award 2007

Ghaffur was awarded the Queen's Police Medal (QPM) in 2001 for Services to Policing and he was appointed Commander of the Order of the British Empire (CBE) for Services to Policing in the 2004 Queen's Birthday Honours.

Ghaffur was awarded an Honorary Degree of Doctor of Laws from Manchester Metropolitan University on 16 July 2007, and an Honorary Degree of Doctor of Laws from the University of Leicester on 25 January 2008.

== Family ==
Ghaffur is married and has two children, one of whom is Faraaz Ghaffur.

Police appointments
Preceded by Michael J. Todd	Metropolitan Police Service; Assistant Commissioner (Policy, Review and Standards); 2001–2002	Succeeded by ?
Preceded by First incumbent	Metropolitan Police Service; Assistant Commissioner (Specialist Crime); 2002–2006	Succeeded by Stephen House
Preceded by Stephen House	Metropolitan Police Service; Assistant Commissioner (Central Operations); 2006–2008	Succeeded by Chris Allison
