= Cressida Dick =

Former Commissioner of the Metropolitan Police in London (born 1960)

Dame Cressida Dick DBE QPM
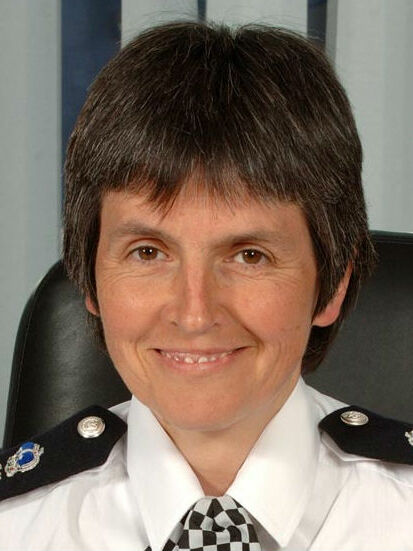
- Cressida Dick in 2017

Commissioner of Police of the Metropolis
- In office 10 April 2017 – 10 April 2022
- Monarch: Elizabeth II
- Deputy: Sir Craig Mackey; Sir Stephen House
- Home Secretary: Amber Rudd; Sajid Javid; Priti Patel
- Mayor: Sadiq Khan
- Preceded by: Sir Bernard Hogan-Howe
- Succeeded by: Sir Mark Rowley (Note: Stephen House acted from 10 April 2022 to 12 September 2022)

Assistant Commissioner of Police of the Metropolis for Specialist Operations
- In office 18 July 2011 – 1 January 2015
- Preceded by: John Yates
- Succeeded by: Mark Rowley

Deputy Commissioner of Police of the Metropolis
- Acting; 8 November 2011 – 23 January 2012
- Preceded by: Tim Godwin
- Succeeded by: Craig Mackey

Personal details
- Born: Cressida Rose Dick; 16 October 1960 (age 66) Oxford, England
- Education: Balliol College, Oxford (BA); Fitzwilliam College, Cambridge (MSt)
- Profession: Police officer

Dame Cressida Rose Dick (born 16 October 1960) is a British former police officer who served as Commissioner of Police of the Metropolis from 2017 to 2022. She is both the first female and the first openly homosexual officer to lead the Metropolitan Police Service (MPS; or "the Met").

Dick joined the MPS in 1983. From 1995 to 2000 she was a high-ranking officer in the Thames Valley Police. After earning a master's degree in criminology, she returned to the Met in 2001, and subsequently held senior roles in the force's diversity directorate, in anti-gang and anti-gun crime operations, and in counterterrorism operations. In June 2009 she was promoted to the rank of assistant commissioner, the first woman to hold this rank substantively. She briefly served as acting deputy commissioner in late 2011 and 2012 during a vacancy in the office. She oversaw the Met's security preparations for the security operations for the 2012 London Olympics. Dick retired from the Met in 2015 to accept a role in the Foreign Office, but returned in 2017 on being selected by the Home Office to succeed Bernard Hogan-Howe as MPS Commissioner, becoming the first woman to hold this post.

Dick's career has included several significant crises and controversies, as well as a series of career comebacks. In 2005, she headed the operation which led to the fatal shooting of Jean Charles de Menezes. A subsequent review faulted the MPS for lapses, but Dick was cleared of personal blame in a trial in 2007. As commissioner, she oversaw a service affected by cuts to police budgets and staffing levels. Controversial aspects of Dick's tenure include the Met's use of stop-and-search tactics, the handling of recommendations made after the botched Operation Midland, and arrests of attendees at a candlelight vigil for Sarah Everard and complaints by the Daniel Morgan Independent Panel that she obstructed their inquiry into police corruption in 2021.

On 10 February 2022, Dick announced she would be leaving the role after losing the confidence of Sadiq Khan, the Mayor of London, over her response to racism and misogyny in the force. Dick left office on 10 April 2022. In January 2023 it was revealed that part of the reason for Dick's ousting was the Met's handling of the case of the serial rapist David Carrick, a Met police officer.

== Early life ==
Dick was born on 16 October 1960 in Oxford, where she was brought up. She is the third and youngest child of Marcus William Dick (1920–1971), Senior Tutor at Balliol College, Oxford, and Professor of Philosophy at the University of East Anglia, and Cecilia Rachel Dick (née Buxton, 1927–1995), a University of Oxford historian, daughter of Wing Commander Denis Alfred Jex Buxton, granddaughter of the banker and politician Alfred Fowell Buxton, and great-granddaughter of Thomas Jex-Blake, headmaster of Rugby School.

Dick was educated at the Dragon School and Oxford High School, then in 1979 she was admitted to Balliol College, Oxford where she took a BA degree in Agriculture and Forest Sciences. While at Oxford, Dick was a wicketkeeper on a cricket team.

Before joining the police, Dick worked briefly in a large accountancy firm. Some years later, she took a course in criminology at Fitzwilliam College, Cambridge, gaining a Master of Studies degree in 2000 and graduating at the top of her class.

== Police career ==
In 1983, Dick joined the Metropolitan Police as a constable, patrolling a beat in the West End of London. Within a decade she had been promoted to chief inspector. In 1995, she transferred to Thames Valley Police, where she was initially a superintendent and then chief superintendent and area commander for Oxford.

She returned to the MPS in 2001 as a commander and head of the diversity directorate. In 2003, she became the head of Operation Trident, which then numbered 300 officers. Operation Trident investigates gang- and gun-related crime; as head of the unit, Dick was credited with progress in reducing crime among "Yardie" drug gangs.

Dick was commander of Operation Kratos, and in the immediate aftermath of the 21 July 2005 London attempted bombings, she was the gold commander in the control room during the operation which led to the police fatally shooting Jean Charles de Menezes, an innocent Brazilian man who had been wrongly identified as a potential suicide bomber. In a 2008 statement to the inquest investigating de Menezes's death, Dick expressed deep personal regret over de Menezes' death, and said, "If you ask me whether I think anybody did anything wrong or unreasonable on the operation, I don't think they did." The inquest jury recorded an open verdict. In a separate trial, the Met was found to have committed catastrophic errors that had led to de Menezes's death, but Dick was cleared of any "personal culpability" for the tragedy. The affair nevertheless almost derailed Dick's career. In 2019, Dick said, "The events of that day stay with one; I think about it quite often. It was a traumatic period. It was an awful time for so many people, obviously and most of all Jean Charles's family, the people who were there when it happened, the firearms officers, the surveillance officers." De Menezes's family opposed Dick's later appointment as Met commissioner.

In 2006, the Metropolitan Police Authority (led by Len Duvall) promoted her to Deputy Assistant Commissioner Security and Protection. In 2009, the Metropolitan Police Authority promoted her to Assistant Commissioner Specialist Crime, in charge of the Specialist Crime Directorate. She became the first woman to become an assistant commissioner. Within the specialist crime directorate, Dick was trained as a hostage negotiator.

In July 2011, Dick was appointed assistant commissioner, specialist operations (responsible for the MPS's counter-terrorism operations) following the resignation of John Yates in the wake of the News International phone hacking scandal. In this role, Dick oversaw security operations for the 2012 London Olympics.

In 2011, Dick was appointed acting deputy commissioner, and held the post between the retirement of Tim Godwin and the commencement of the new deputy commissioner Craig Mackey's term at the beginning of 2012. She held the rank until 23 January 2012.

Commissioner Bernard Hogan-Howe subsequently ousted her from her position as the MPS's counterterrorism head after their relationship became strained. In mid-2014, Dick had been one of three short-listed candidates for the position of chief constable of the Police Service of Northern Ireland, but George Hamilton was selected for the role instead. It was announced in December 2014 that she would retire from the police in 2015 to join the Foreign Office, in an unspecified director-general level posting. The Foreign Office refused Freedom of Information requests for information on her job title, role and responsibilities, or her wage. In the Daily Telegraph, Martin Evans wrote that she had "an unspecified and rather shadowy security role" at the Foreign Office.

=== Commissioner of the Metropolitan Police ===
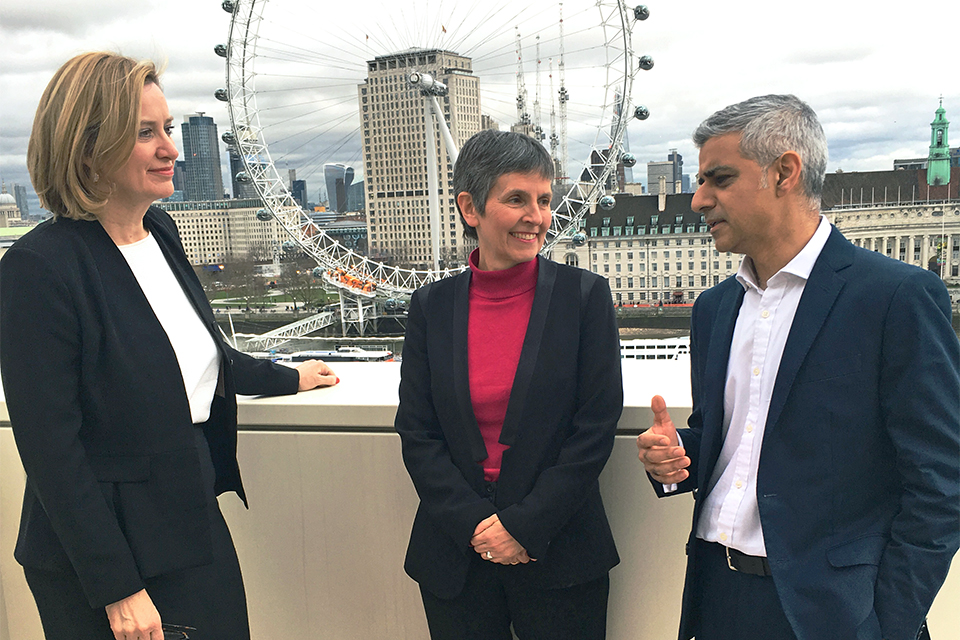
Dick (center) with Home Secretary Amber Rudd (left) and Mayor of London Sadiq Khan (right) on the day her appointment as the next Commissioner of the Metropolitan Police was announced.

On 22 February 2017, the Home Office and the MPS jointly announced that Dick would be appointed as the next Commissioner of the Metropolitan Police. Her appointment was supported by the Home Secretary Amber Rudd. The appointment was formally made by Queen Elizabeth II, via a warrant under the royal sign-manual, on the recommendation of Rudd. (MPS commissioners are selected by the Home Secretary with input from the mayor of London.) Dick was selected over three other short-listed contenders: Sara Thornton, the chair of the National Police Chiefs' Council; Mark Rowley, an assistant commissioner for counterterrorism at the Met, and Stephen Kavanagh, the chief constable of the Essex Police. The term of the police commissioner is five years, although two of Dick's last three predecessors were ousted early.

Dick assumed office on 10 April 2017; her first official engagement was the funeral of PC Keith Palmer, the officer killed in a terrorist attack at the Westminster Bridge, outside the Palace of Westminster, the previous month.

As commissioner, Dick has criticised police budget cuts, saying that they inhibit the MPS's operations, including counterterrorism efforts; she has attributed rising violent crime in London in part due to budget cuts. In June 2017, after the terrorist attacks at Westminster, London Bridge, and Finsbury Park, Dick called for the government to give more resources for police; budgets and police force strength had declined from a peak in 2009–2010. In 2018, the number of MPS police officers fell below 35,000 for the first time in 15 years; Dick sought to "get to well over 30,500 officers, more than 500 more than we currently have" by the end of 2019. Dick blamed "the glamorisation of violence" and "social media being used to taunt other gangs" as additional factors fueling an increase in violent crime.

Dick expressed concern in 2018 about the impact of a no-deal Brexit, saying that it would be costly and place the public at risk by reducing or eliminating the UK's access to databases, quick extradition processes, and law enforcement cooperation with other EU member states.

To combat an increase in moped crime in London (in which criminals on scooters perpetrated "snatch and grab" phone thefts, other robberies, and acid attacks), Dick allowed pursuing police officers to ram moped-riding suspects off the road. The "tactical contact" manoeuvre was criticised by some as unduly risky, but Dick defended the practice, citing a decrease in moped-facilitated crime since police began to use the technique. Dick said that "tactical contact" was used to end moped pursuits on rare occasions by well-trained police who assessed all the risks, adding, that police aimed to "put the fear back into the criminal." In late 2018, the Met under Dick approved plans to allow police officers to conduct armed foot patrols of high-crime residential areas, a break from the usual practice of British police not routinely carrying firearms. The plan was controversial; the Met stated that the plan would not be a precursor to routine armed patrols, but rather was a limited measure to combat violent, often gang-related crime in London. Dick stated that such patrols would be deployed only in "extreme circumstances" to support the unarmed officers.

Dick's official portrait as commissioner was unveiled in July 2019. The oil painting, which Dick paid for from her salary, depicts the commissioner in front of a map of London, wearing a police shirt rather than full tunic uniform. Dick sat for twenty hours for the portraitist Frances Bell. The painting hangs at the Hendon Police College alongside portraits of her 26 male predecessors. While portraits are usually unveiled after a commissioner has stepped down, Dick's portrait was unveiled as part of celebrations marking the centenary of the first woman joining the Met.

Criticism of Dick's tenure has focused on the MPS's actions in the aftermath of Operation Midland, a botched MPS investigation into alleged child sex abuse. The investigation, triggered by the false allegations of a fantasist who was later convicted of perverting the course of justice and fraud, collapsed in 2016. An inquiry led by Sir Richard Henriques identified 43 mistakes by the MPS and made 25 urgent recommendations for the MPS to adopt, but a Her Majesty's Inspectorate of Constabulary and Fire & Rescue Services (HMICFRS) report concluded that the MPS had delayed implementing most of the recommendations, with the MPS starting to adopt most reforms in 2019 under pressure from the Home Office. Six former home secretaries said that the police operation undermined public confidence in the police, and Dick faced pressure to resign over the matter. In 2020, however, the Independent Office for Police Conduct cleared Dick of allegations relating to the investigation, finding no evidence that she had "deliberately misled the public regarding her role" in the operation, in which Dick had been briefly involved in 2014, before leaving the Met to join the Foreign Office.

During Dick's tenure, racial disparities in the MPS's use of stop and search were also controversial; black and ethnic minority Britons are many times more likely than white Britons to be stopped and searched by police. Critics contend that the disparity is caused by racial discrimination among police, and that the tactic alienates minority communities. Dick, with the support of Home Secretary Amber Rudd, staunchly defended the use of stop and search, contending that the measure effectively combats knife crime and saves lives.

In 2018, Dick launched a campaign to increase the proportion of female officers in the MPS. At the time, 27% of Met officers were women; Dick aimed to increase that figure to 50% over time, although she did not set a target date. In 2020, London Mayor Sadiq Khan and the MPS announced that that police force would aim to have at least 40% of their recruits be from Black, Asian and minority ethnic backgrounds by 2022; Dick said that the MPS was "not free from racism or discrimination" and the MPS was "committed to eliminating the disproportionate use of force on Black Londoners."

Dick has defended the controversial police use of live facial recognition systems. In 2018, Dick said that police were "hamstrung" by legal limitations over the use of facial recognition. in 2020, after the Royal United Services Institute issued a report recommending regulations on police use of the technology, Dick said that privacy campaigners were "ill-informed" and that facial recognition was a valuable tool to apprehend "the criminals, the rapists, the terrorists and all those who want to harm you, your family and friends."

Dick has been critical of the depiction of police in the television drama Line of Duty; in 2019, while accepting that the police procedural was "good drama" and could raise public interest in the police, Dick said she was "absolutely outraged" at the show depicting "casual and extreme corruption" as a common occurrence in policing.

In March 2021, Dick was criticised for Metropolitan Police's handling of a vigil for Sarah Everard, who was abducted and murdered by a Met officer in south London. At the vigils, officers arrested four attendees, alleging violations of COVID-19 restrictions on public gatherings. Liberal Democrat leader Ed Davey led calls for her resignation. Dick defended the MPS's conduct; said that policing was "fiendishly difficult"; and criticised what she called "armchair" critics. She also suggested that if women felt unsafe when approached by officers they should resist arrest, run away, then "wave down a bus" or call 999; these remarks prompted criticism that Dick and the Met were not taking the matter seriously. Opposition Leader Keir Starmer, London mayor Sadiq Khan, campaigners and backbench MPs all criticised the Metropolitan Police. Dick retained the confidence of Prime Minister Boris Johnson and Home Secretary Priti Patel. Patel directed Her Majesty's Inspectorate of Constabulary and Fire & Rescue Services (HMICFRS) to look into the police response to the incident. HMICFRS reported in March 2021 that the police "reacted appropriately and were not heavy handed" and were "justified" in their handling of the vigil. A whistleblower within HMICFRS, however, filed a formal complaint alleging that the inspectorate's review of the vigil, as well as other demonstrations, had been marred by a repeated pro-police bias, anti-demonstrator bias in violation of the Civil Service Code. Reclaim These Streets, which organised the vigil, subsequently prevailed in a lawsuit against the Met; the High Court ruled in March 2022 that the police force had violated participants' human rights to freedom of speech and assembly, and had failed to conduct a proper proportionality assessment when determining what actions to take.

In the 2021 report into the unsolved 1987 murder of Daniel Morgan, Dick was criticised for hampering efforts to gain access to important information, causing delays in the report's release.

In February 2022, a report was released by the Independent Office for Police Conduct (IOPC) accusing officers at Charing Cross Police Station of misogyny, racism, discrimination, bullying and sexual assault and suggesting these were not isolated cases within the police force.

On 10 February 2022, Dick announced her resignation as Met Commissioner, stating that "the Mayor no longer has sufficient confidence in my leadership". Ian Blair, a former Met police commissioner, has said Boris Johnson should not be involved in appointing Dick's successor due to being subject to a police investigation over possible breaches of COVID regulations. Dick left office on 10 April 2022. Sir Stephen House took over the role as Acting Commissioner until a successor, Sir Mark Rowley, was appointed in July 2022. In January 2023, Met police constable David Carrick pleaded guilty to 49 counts of offences against twelve women, including rape and false imprisonment; lifted reporting restrictions revealed that the Met's mishandling of his case was part of the reason Dick had been ousted.

In January 2026, a Met Police review revealed that in an attempt to meet the diversity targets set by Dick, senior figures in the force had allowed recruitment standards to fall. More than 100 applicants who initially failed vetting procedures were later allowed to join after their cases were referred to a special panel set up to scrutinise rejected applications from ethnic minority candidates. Several of these went on to commit criminal offences or misconduct, including violence, sex attacks and drug use.

== Personal life ==
Dick came out as lesbian in April 2017, making her the highest-ranked openly gay officer in British police history. Her partner, Helen, was an Inspector in the MPS in south London before retiring in 2017.

== Honours ==
Dick was awarded the Queen's Police Medal for Distinguished Service in the 2010 New Year Honours. She was appointed a Commander of the Order of the British Empire (CBE) in the 2015 New Year Honours for services to policing. In September 2019, she was promoted to Dame Commander of the Order of the British Empire (DBE) in Theresa May's resignation honours.

In 2013, she was named one of the 100 most powerful women in the United Kingdom by Woman's Hour on BBC Radio 4.

Ribbon	Description	Notes
	Order of the British Empire (DBE)	Commander; Civil Division 2015 New Year Honours List: Dame Commander; Civil Division 2019 Resignation Honours List
	Queen's Police Medal (QPM)	For Distinguished Service; 2010 New Year Honours List
	Queen Elizabeth II Golden Jubilee Medal	2002; UK version of this medal
	Queen Elizabeth II Diamond Jubilee Medal	2012; UK version of this medal
	Queen Elizabeth II Platinum Jubilee Medal	2022; UK version of this medal
	Police Long Service and Good Conduct Medal	

=== Scholastic ===
Chancellor, visitor, governor, rector and fellowships

Location	Date	School	Position
England	2 December 2019 – present	Balliol College, Oxford	Honorary Fellow
England		Fitzwilliam College, Cambridge	Honorary Fellow

Honorary degrees

Location	Date	School	Degree	Gave commencement address
England	2015	University of Westminster	Doctor of Letters (D.Litt.)	Yes
England	19 July 2018	Cranfield University	Doctorate	Yes
Wales		Cardiff Metropolitan University	Doctorate	Yes

== Notes ==
Police appointments
Preceded by John Yates	Assistant Commissioner of Police of the Metropolis (Specialist Crime Directorate); 2009–2011	Succeeded by Lynne Owens
Preceded by John Yates	Assistant Commissioner of Police of the Metropolis (Specialist Operations); 2011–2015	Succeeded by Mark Rowley
Preceded by Sir Bernard Hogan-Howe	Commissioner of Police of the Metropolis; 2017–2022	Succeeded by Stephen House (acting)
