= Brian Paddick, Baron Paddick =

British politician and police officer (born 1958)

The Right Honourable The Lord Paddick
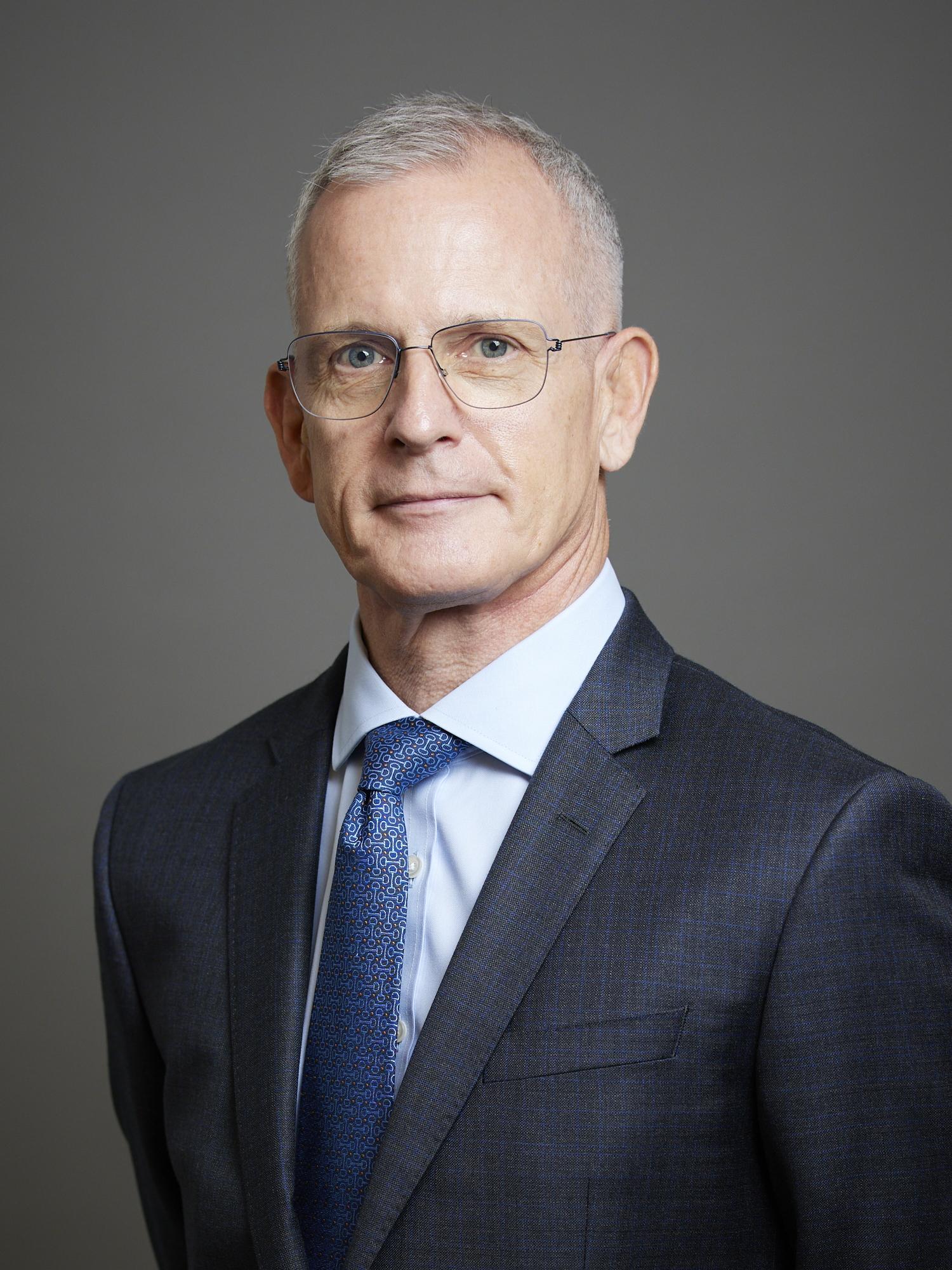
- Official portrait, 2022

Liberal Democrat Spokesperson for Home Affairs
- In office 28 October 2016 – 14 June 2017
- Leader: Tim Farron
- Preceded by: Alistair Carmichael
- Succeeded by: Ed Davey

Member of the House of Lords
- Lord Temporal
- Life peerage 12 September 2013

Personal details
- Born: Brian Leonard Paddick; 24 April 1958 (age 68) Balham, London, England
- Party: Non-affiliated (since 2023)
- Other political affiliations: Liberal Democrats (until 2023)
- Spouses: Mary Stone (m. 1983; div. 1988) Petter Belsvik (m. 2009; died 2023)
- Education: The Queen's College, Oxford (BA); University of Warwick (MBA); Fitzwilliam College, Cambridge (PGD)
- Website: www.brianpaddick.com
- Police career
- Service: Metropolitan Police
- Service years: 1976–2007
- Rank: Deputy Assistant Commissioner

Brian Leonard Paddick, Baron Paddick (born 24 April 1958), is a British life peer and retired police officer. He was the Liberal Democrat candidate for the London mayoral elections of 2008 and of 2012, and until his retirement in May 2007 was a deputy assistant commissioner in the Metropolitan Police Service.

Paddick joined the Metropolitan Police in 1976. Rising through the ranks, he was appointed the officer in charge of the Criminal Investigation Department (CID) at Notting Hill in 1995, then returned to New Scotland Yard, first as Superintendent of the Personnel Department in 1996 and then as Chief Superintendent in 1997. In December 2000 he was appointed Police Commander for the London Borough of Lambeth, where he worked until 2002.

In the latter capacity, Paddick attracted controversy by instructing his police officers not to arrest or charge people found with cannabis so that they could focus on crimes that were affecting the quality of life in the borough to a greater extent.

In late 2002, the Crown Prosecution Service decided that no charges would be brought against him in relation to alleged cannabis possession; in December 2003 Paddick and The Mail on Sunday settled legal proceedings brought by him, with the newspaper accepting that a story it had published was false (which had alleged he had used cannabis), apologising, and paying damages.

In April 2005 Paddick took over management of territorial policing across all 32 London boroughs. During the investigation by the Independent Police Complaints Commission (IPCC) into the wrongful shooting of Jean Charles de Menezes at Stockwell Tube station on 22 July 2005, Paddick stated that a member of the private office team of Sir Ian Blair, Commissioner of the Metropolitan Police, had believed the wrong man had been targeted just six hours after the shooting. This allegation was contradicted by New Scotland Yard. On 28 March 2006, Paddick accepted a statement from the Metropolitan Police that it "did not intend to imply" a senior officer had misled the probe into the shooting and that "any misunderstanding is regretted".

However, following the disagreement, Paddick was assigned the position of group director of information management at New Scotland Yard, which he considered a "non-job". He came to accept that his police career was over, and retired from the police force on 31 May 2007. In November 2007, it was announced that Paddick had been selected as the Liberal Democrat candidate for Mayor of London in the mayoral elections to be held on 1 May 2008. He came third, behind Boris Johnson and Ken Livingstone, winning 9.8 per cent of first preference votes.

Paddick was created a life peer in 2013, taking the title Baron Paddick, of Brixton in the London Borough of Lambeth, sitting in the House of Lords for the Liberal Democrats. He became a non-affiliated member of the Lords upon his appointment as a non-executive advisor for the Metropolitan Police in 2023.

== Early life ==
Paddick was born on 24 April 1958 in Balham in London, England, and spent his early years in Mitcham and Tooting Bec. He was educated at Bec Grammar School in Tooting Bec, and at Sutton Manor High School (now Sutton Grammar School), in Sutton. He went on to take a Bachelor of Arts in Philosophy, Politics and Economics at The Queen's College, Oxford and a Master of Business Administration at Warwick Business School, University of Warwick (1989–1990) on police scholarships; and also studied for a postgraduate Diploma in Policing and Applied Criminology at Fitzwilliam College, Cambridge. When he was at Oxford, he was Captain of the University Swimming Team and Vice-Captain of his college's rugby team.

He is the twin brother of J. H. Paddick and the grandson of a policeman and the son of Anthony Henry J. Paddick and Evelyn Perkin. He is the second cousin once removed of actor and comedian Hugh Paddick.

== Police career ==
Paddick joined the Metropolitan Police Service in 1976, living in Highbury and Limehouse while he worked for four years as a Constable in Holloway. Rising through the ranks, he served as a response team officer, community officer, detective, and as a member of the Territorial Support Group (commonly referred to as the TSG or riot squad). Paddick was a sergeant on the front line during the 1981 Brixton riot, an experience that shaped his attitudes about confrontational police action and strengthened his belief in community policing. He was appointed Inspector in Fulham in 1983, Chief Inspector of the Personnel Department of New Scotland Yard in 1986, a staff officer in 1991, and Chief Inspector in Brixton in 1993. During this period, he also worked in Deptford, Lewisham, Thornton Heath (where his brother was the local vicar) and Notting Hill while living in Sutton, Pimlico and Westminster, and for a while outside London. In 1995, Paddick became the officer in charge of the Criminal Investigation Department (CID) at Notting Hill and was responsible for policing the Notting Hill Carnival.

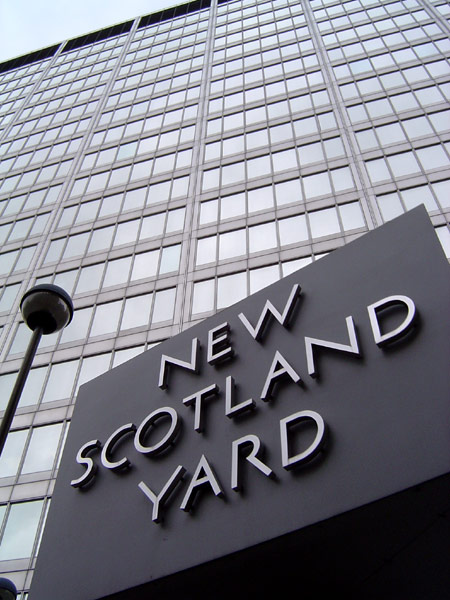
New Scotland Yard, London

Paddick returned to New Scotland Yard, first as Superintendent of the Personnel Department in 1996 and then as Chief Superintendent in 1997. He then served as Borough Commander for Merton for two and a half years (1997–1999), responsible for policing Wimbledon, Mitcham and Merton. After attending the Police Staff College in 2000, in December 2000 he was appointed Police Commander for the London Borough of Lambeth where he worked until 2002, fulfilling his ambition of becoming head of policing in Brixton. At Lambeth he had direct responsibility for 940 police officers and 230 support staff, and an annual budget of £37 million.

After a stint in the Specialist Crime Directorate, which deals with serious cases such as murder, kidnap and fraud, Paddick returned to borough-based policing, overseeing the northwest London boroughs of Barnet, Brent, Camden, Ealing, Hammersmith and Fulham, Harrow, Hillingdon, and Islington between 2002 and 2003. He was also responsible for youth and community issues including Police Community Support Officers and police volunteers across the whole of London.

In November 2003 Paddick was promoted to Deputy Assistant Commissioner, and in April 2005 he took over management of Territorial Policing across all 32 London boroughs, with responsibility for 20,000 police officers and support staff. He was accountable for reducing "volume crime" in London (all offences up to and including rape in terms of seriousness) and increasing the number of offenders brought to justice. He was the national lead for the police service on disability and mental health issues for a year and a half. He was also in the media spotlight as the senior Metropolitan Police Service spokesman for the Funeral of Diana, Princess of Wales and after the 7 July 2005 London bombings.

Following a widely publicised disagreement with Sir Ian Blair, the Commissioner of the Metropolitan Police, over the wrongful shooting of Jean Charles de Menezes at Stockwell Tube station on 22 July 2005, Paddick was assigned the position of group director of information management, which he considered a "non-job". Claiming that the Home Office had intervened for political reasons to ensure that Blair would not have to resign over the incident as it had occurred in the aftermath of 21 July 2005 London bombings, Paddick says he came to accept that his police career was over and that he would never achieve his goal of becoming a chief constable.

Paddick retired from the police force on 31 May 2007. He is currently a Visiting Fellow of Ashridge Business School near Berkhamsted in Hertfordshire, where he lectures on leadership, change management and diversity.

=== Press controversy ===
In 2001, as Commander for the London Borough of Lambeth, Paddick started to make postings on London web discussion forum Urban75. According to Paddick's autobiography, he had initially contacted Urban75 as part of an Internet campaign against the Brixton-based Movement For Justice By Any Means Necessary (MFJ), which was campaigning for justice after the police killing of local Derek Bennett. He also attacked MFJ chairman Alex Owolade who was subsequently sacked from his employment with Lambeth London Borough Council.

At around this time, the national press also began coverage of the pilot cannabis programme in Brixton where officers were instructed not to arrest or charge people who were found to be in possession of cannabis. They were instead to issue on-the-spot warnings and confiscate the drugs. Although Paddick is credited with the idea, the pilot programme was sanctioned by the Commissioner of Police of the Metropolis, Sir John Stevens.

Paddick argued that the policy allowed his officers to deal with cannabis quickly and informally, freeing them to concentrate on heroin and crack cocaine offences, as well as other offences such as street robbery and burglary, which he and others felt were affecting the quality of life in Lambeth to a greater extent. "[P]olice officers said they weren't prepared any longer to drop cannabis down the drain because one of their colleagues had been arrested by internal investigators apparently for doing just that. They were going to arrest everybody they found even with the smallest amount of cannabis. I couldn't have allowed that to happen. They would have been doing nothing else."

Critics accused him of being soft on drugs, and the policy became a source of public controversy and debate. The situation worsened when The Mail on Sunday published a false story by his former partner, James Renolleau, that Commander Paddick had used cannabis himself. They also highlighted his homosexuality as a matter of concern, and claimed he was an anarchist based on a comment he had made on Urban75 in January 2002. In fact, he had written that "the concept of anarchy has always appealed to me", but that he was "not sure everyone would behave well if there were no laws and no system."

Following the controversy, Paddick was transferred to an intelligence position and the allegations were investigated by the Crown Prosecution Service. His transfer led to public rallies in Lambeth in his support. The CPS decided in late 2002 that no charges would be brought. In November 2003, Paddick was promoted to Deputy Assistant Commissioner for Territorial Policing. In a December 2003 out-of-court settlement, the Mail on Sunday accepted that their story was false, apologised, and paid damages.

The situation did, however, encourage the British government to re-evaluate its policies with regard to drugs, and reclassifying cannabis from a class B to a class C drug was suggested. Subsequently, the law was altered in February 2004.

In September 2007 Paddick commented: "I always felt like a fish out of water in the police, not just on gay issues but generally. I was a very counter-cultural senior officer. I'm very non-hierarchical and got into trouble for insisting on people calling me by my first name. I was trying to effect the most difficult change there is in an organisation, which is a change of culture – to try to make it more liberal, more understanding of difference."

=== Jean Charles de Menezes ===
After the 21 July 2005 London bombings and the subsequent police shooting of Jean Charles de Menezes on 22 July 2005 at the Stockwell Tube station in London, Paddick met Stockwell community leaders. Kate Hoey, Member of Parliament for Vauxhall which covers the area, had requested the meeting to help reassure local residents.

Paddick was quoted by the BBC as stating, "It was a very calm meeting. People were very understanding of the circumstances that these officers found themselves in. We expressed our sympathy to the family of the person who was tragically killed. It was a very measured meeting, but a very positive meeting." He would not promise that a similar tragedy would never happen again, but he stated it was not likely.

In March 2006 it was revealed that Paddick had consulted libel lawyers in connection with statements issued by Scotland Yard. In verbal and written statements to the Independent Police Complaints Commission (IPCC) on their investigations into the shooting of Jean Charles de Menezes, he had stated that a member of the Commissioner of the Metropolitan Police Sir Ian Blair's private office team believed the wrong man had been targeted just six hours after the shooting. This was contrary to statements made at the time.

When this allegation became public following an unauthorised disclosure, Scotland Yard issued a statement claiming that the officer alleged to have believed this [Paddick] "has categorically denied this in his interview with, and statement to, the IPCC investigators". The statement continued that they "were satisfied that whatever the reasons for this suggestion being made, it is simply not true". Paddick's interpretation of this statement was that it accused him of lying.

On 28 March 2006, Paddick accepted a statement from the Metropolitan Police that it "did not intend to imply" a senior officer had misled the probe into the shooting of Jean Charles de Menezes. In a statement, the Metropolitan Police said "any misunderstanding is regretted" and that Paddick had accepted its "clarification" and considered the matter closed.

In a lengthy interview with Paddick published in The Daily Telegraph on 17 November 2007 detailing his thinking on becoming Mayor of London, he made a revealing comment possibly connected with difficulties that have arisen because of the de Menezes killing: "Policing is a dangerous job, we should trust the professional judgement of officers on the front line. We shouldn't prosecute them or their bosses if they decide to put their lives on the line for the public." In addition, on 26 November 2007 in The Independent Paddick was asked if Commissioner Ian Blair should have resigned over the de Menezes case. His response was: "Yes. The public allows the police to use force on the understanding that someone will be held to account if something goes wrong. An innocent man was killed by the police and in the absence of any individual officer being held to account, the person at the top should take responsibility."

== Liberal Democrat candidate for Mayor of London ==
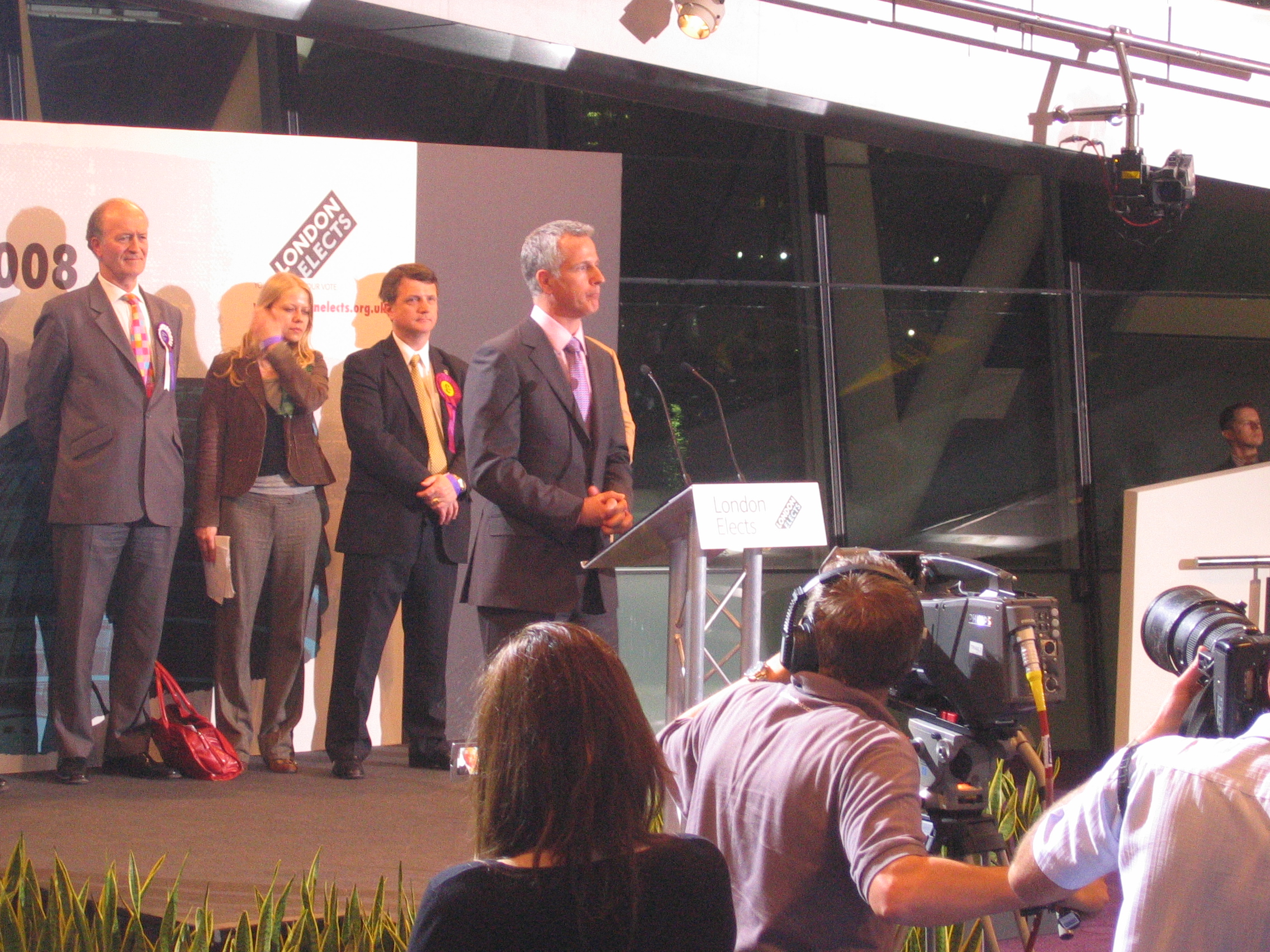
Paddick speaking in City Hall after the results of the London mayoral election had been announced, 3 May 2008

In August 2006, it was reported by The Observer's "Pendennis" column that Paddick was considering seeking selection as the Liberal Democrats' candidate for Mayor of London in the mayoral elections to be held in 2008. This was confirmed a year later by the BBC. He received an endorsement from Lynne Featherstone MP, a former member of the London Assembly, on her blog.

On 2 September 2007, Paddick informed Pink News of some of his priorities if elected mayor. On illegal drugs, he reiterated that they are "dangerous and harmful and it is better if people live without them", but that he had a "realistic approach" to enforcement and would not be afraid of adopting a "radical solution if it's fully thought through, if it's workable, affordable and gets the right result". He promised to regulate the timings of London's buses and to apply the London congestion charge in a more sophisticated manner that differentiated wealthy chauffeur-driven chief executives from delivery drivers. As regards the 2012 Summer Olympics to be held in London, he pledged to ensure that "the best possible show" would be staged with "value for money for every single pound spent". In addition, in a leaflet released on his campaign website on 10 September, he pledged to "put more police officers, fully trained, equipped and with the necessary powers out on the street, dealing with violent gun and knife crime", to take the lead in tackling climate change and minimising the impact on the environment by powering the London Underground with renewable energy, and to provide the right environment for business without interfering in businesses.

On 13 November 2007, it was announced that Paddick had been selected as the Liberal Democrat candidate for Mayor of London. He won 73% of the first preference votes during the selection contest. Paddick joined, among others, Ken Livingstone as the Labour candidate and Conservative Party candidate Boris Johnson. However, a poll conducted by The Guardian and ICM published on 3 April 2008 found that Paddick was the first choice of only 10% of voters. He therefore had little chance of winning, as 42% supported Johnson and 41% Livingstone. The poll was borne out by the results of the elections on 1 May 2008. On 3 May it was announced that Boris Johnson had been elected. Paddick was in third place behind Ken Livingstone, with 9.8% (236,685 out of 2,415,958) of the first preference votes.

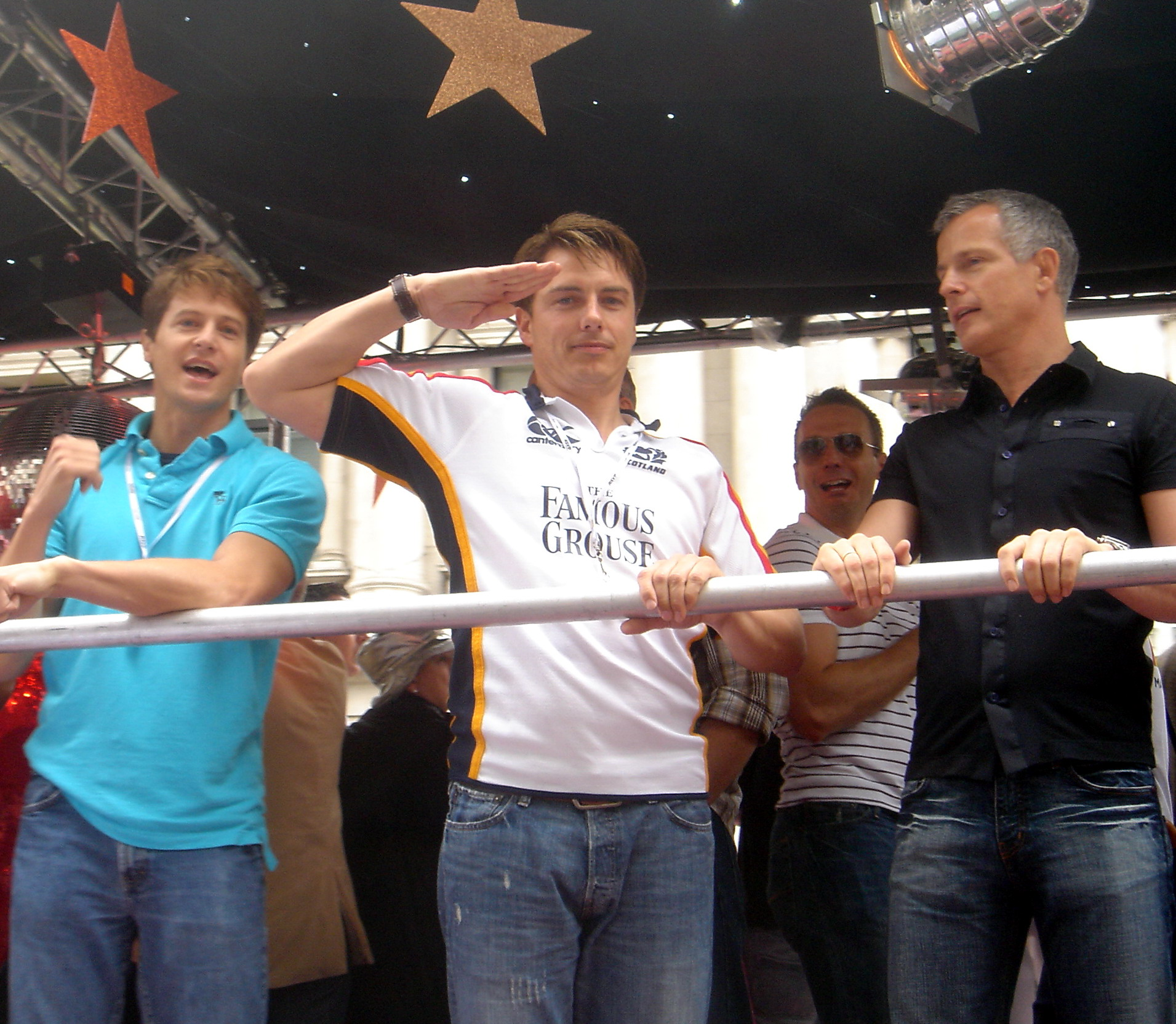
Paddick on a float at the London Gay Pride parade on 30 June 2007 with, from his right, actor John Barrowman and Barrowman's partner Scott Gill

=== Liberal Democrat candidate for Mayor of London election 2012 ===
On Thursday 16 June 2011, it was reported that Paddick had entered nomination papers to stand once again for the Liberal Democrats in the 2012 London mayoral elections. On Friday 2 September he was selected as the Liberal Democrat candidate.

On election day itself, Paddick won 91,774 or 4.16% of the first preference votes, behind eventual winner Boris Johnson for the Conservatives, former mayor Ken Livingstone for Labour, and Greens candidate Jenny Jones. He lost almost half of his support compared to 2008, mainly attributed to the performance of the coalition government in Westminster and the popularity levels of the Liberal Democrats on a national scale.

== House of Lords activities ==
Having been elevated to the House of Lords on 16 September 2013, he led a debate on the public trust of police, on 28 November 2013.

In the 2016 Autumn Party Convention, Lord Paddick saw the Liberty and Security Policy Paper produced by the working party he chaired accepted by the convention. This paper, while recognising the danger of terrorism, took issue with the Investigatory Powers Bill and the Counter-Extremism and Safeguarding Bill, rejecting "the idea that indiscriminate monitoring or limiting of legal free speech enhances security."

In October 2023, Lord Paddick withdrew from Liberal Democrat whip following his appointment as a non-executive advisor with the Metropolitan Police. He will sit as a non-affiliated member for the duration of the appointment.

== Personal life ==
Since childhood, Paddick has known he was gay, but between 1983 and 1988 he was married to Mary Stone in what he called "a genuine attempt to live as a straight man" – "It's what my faith as a Christian expected of me. It's what my parents expected of me. It's what the police service expected of me. Mary was a very beautiful and charming woman. It was a genuine attempt to try and deny my sexuality and to 'do the right thing'." According to Paddick, it was "a fairly conventional marriage" and his former wife said it was "a wonderful marriage". She did not know he was gay. He struggled with his sexuality until towards the end of his marriage in 1988: "I learned the lesson about being yourself before that, and being open about my sexuality was the last piece in the jigsaw. I wasn't open about my sexuality until I was a commander." A November 2003 profile in The Guardian noted: "Mr Paddick is relaxed enough to laugh at himself and told a gay magazine: 'My last staff officer got promoted and went to royalty protection. In his leaving card I wrote, "Same job, different Queen".'" Paddick currently lives in Vauxhall, London. He lived there previously with Petter Belsvik, a civil engineer from Oslo, Norway; they met in a bar while on holiday in Ibiza. They married in Oslo, same-sex marriage in Norway being legalised 8 days before, on 9 January 2009. Belsvik died at the end of February 2023.

Paddick was a contestant on the eighth series of the ITV1 reality television show I'm a Celebrity... Get Me Out of Here!, which began its broadcast on 16 November 2008. On 1 December 2008, he became the sixth celebrity to be voted off the show. Interviewed by the show's hosts Ant & Dec after leaving the jungle, he explained his reasons for participating: "For a long time I've been doing serious stuff. Thirty years in the police and running for mayor. It's all bad news that they want me to comment on. So I thought why not come and do something trivial. ... It's the hardest thing I've ever done in my life, anything after this is a breeze."

In 2008, Paddick was ranked number 101 in the annual Pink List of influential gay and lesbian people in Britain published by The Independent on Sunday, down from number 83 in 2007.

In 2010, Paddick appeared on Channel 4's alternative election night special of Come Dine with Me alongside Edwina Currie, Rod Liddle and Derek Hatton.

Speaking about his marriage in Norway as part of the 2010 Liberal Democrat debate about equal marriage for gay people, Paddick said: "The real impact of [marriage rather than a civil partnership], the symbolism of it, the importance of it, didn't really strike me until we stood in front of the judge in the courthouse in Oslo, and she said ... we're here today to witness the marriage of Brian and Petter. And that was an intensely moving experience. We really feel, my husband and I, that we are really equal because we are married."

In July 2018, Paddick revealed that he was a participant in the PrEP (Pre-Exposure Prophylaxis) medication trials being carried out at the time by the NHS in England. The medication is used to prevent HIV-negative people from acquiring HIV.

Orders of precedence in the United Kingdom
Preceded by The Lord Sherbourne of Didsbury	Gentlemen; Baron Paddick	Followed by The Lord Purvis of Tweed
