= Chris Allison (police officer) =

British police officer (born 1962)

Chris Allison CBE
- Born: 1962 (age 63–64)
- Police career
- Department: Metropolitan Police Service
- Service years: 1984–2014
- Rank: Assistant Commissioner
- Awards: CBE

Christopher John Allison CBE (born 1962) is a British former police officer who served as Assistant Commissioner of the Metropolitan Police Service. He was the National Olympic Security Coordinator for the 2012 Summer Olympics and Paralympics. He has been involved in the policing of public order events for much of his career and was previously Assistant Commissioner for Central Operations.

== Police career ==
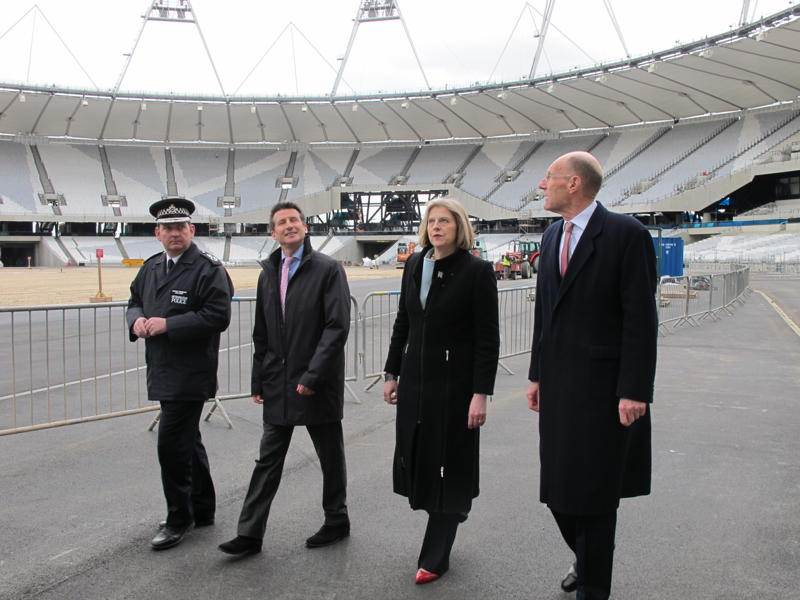
Allison (left) during a visit to the Olympic Stadium in 2011

Allison joined the Metropolitan Police in 1984, initially serving as a constable in Walthamstow, and was promoted through the ranks. In 1996, he became a Chief Inspector at Hammersmith, where his responsibilities included the policing of Queens Park Rangers F.C. matches. He served as staff officer to the then deputy commissioner Sir John Stevens between 1998 and 2000. In 2000, he was appointed Divisional Commander at Paddington, and was promoted to Chief Superintendent in 2001. In 2002, he was promoted to Commander, and appointed Borough Commander for the City of Westminster.

Allison was a member of several MPS Public Order Cadres including the Public Order Command Cadre, and in this capacity has commanded police operations at major incidents and events in London. He was the gold commander in the aftermath of the 7 July 2005 London bombings, for which he was appointed Member of the Order of the British Empire (MBE) in the 2006 New Year Honours. Allison was also the Association of Chief Police Officers' lead on alcohol and licensing matters between 2004 and 2008, with responsibility for co-ordinating policy of police forces nationally.

In 2008, Allison was appointed temporary Assistant Commissioner with responsibility for Central Operations, replacing Tarique Ghaffur when he stepped down. He was appointed Assistant Commissioner in May 2009, and given responsibility for planning the policing of the 2012 Olympics. He held this position until the end of 2010, taking up a full-time role leading security for the Olympics in January 2011.

Allison was appointed Commander of the Order of the British Empire (CBE) in the 2013 Queen's Birthday Honours "for services to the security of the Olympics".

== Honours ==

Ribbon	Description	Notes
	Order of the British Empire (CBE)	Civil Division; Member 2006 New Year Honours List; Commander 2013 Queen's Birthday Honours List
	Queen Elizabeth II Golden Jubilee Medal	2002; UK version
	Queen Elizabeth II Diamond Jubilee Medal	2012; UK version
	Police Long Service and Good Conduct Medal	

Police appointments
Preceded by Tarique Ghaffur	Assistant Commissioner (Central Operations); Metropolitan Police Service; 2008–2010	Succeeded by Lynne Owens
