= Police Now =

British charity

- Formation: 2015; 11 years ago
- Type: Registered Charity and Company limited by guarantee
- Registration no.: 1168427
- Purpose: Police Officer Recruitment
- Headquarters: Blue Fin Building
- Location: London, United Kingdom
- Coordinates: 51.5045°N 0.10419°W
- Services: National Graduate Programme
- Chair: Peter Freedman
- Affiliations: Home Office; Metropolitan Police Service
- Budget: £12.8 m GBP (2024)
- Revenue: £10.5 m GBP (2024)
- Staff: 115 (2024)
- Website: www.policenow.org.uk

Police Now is a British charity that recruits and trains people to become police officers and detectives via its National Graduate Programme. Graduates on the programme train in one of four policing specialisms: neighbourhood, detective, economic crime, or counter terrorism.

== History ==
Police Now was initially set up as a graduate scheme, following its incubation within the Metropolitan Police, Police Now became an independent charitable enterprise in April 2016. The scheme was inspired by Teach First, the educational initiative that recruits graduates into schools.

== Activities ==
Police Now recruits students into policing across England and Wales. The charity delivers two programme recruiting future Neighbourhood Police Officers and direct entry Detectives.

Police Now is known for its focus on recruiting a diverse range of people into policing with a particular focus on recruiting Black, Asian and minority ethnic people. The social enterprise believes the wider policing sector can do more to advance diversity and inclusion. During a recruitment campaign arguing that police forces needed to reflect the communities they serve, Lord Woolley, a trustee of the charity, claimed the lack of diversity in UK police forces could be attributed to stop and search and criminalisation of young black men for minor offences.

== Governance ==
Police Now's board of trustees is chaired by Peter Freedman. The organisation is a registered charity, and a registered company limited by guarantee.

=== The charity has appointed a number of notable trustees ===
- Helen Ball, Assistant Commissioner of the Metropolitan Police
- Louisa Rolfe, Assistant Commissioner of the Metropolitan Police
- Simon Woolley, Baron Woolley of Woodford, Political activist and politician
- James Bowler, Senior Civil Servant
- Rhammel Afflick, Political activist
- Judith Clegg, Entrepreneur and author
