= Helen Ball =

British police officer

Helen Ball QPM

Deputy Commissioner of Police of the Metropolis Acting
- In office April 2022 – 12 September 2022
- Preceded by: Sir Stephen House
- Succeeded by: Lynne Owens (Acting)

Assistant Commissioner (Professionalism) Metropolitan Police Service
- In office July 2017 – October 2022
- Preceded by: Helen King
- Succeeded by: Barbara Gray

Deputy Assistant Commissioner (Territorial Policing) Metropolitan Police Service
- In office 2012–2013

Senior National Co-ordinator for Counter Terrorism Policing National Police Chiefs' Council
- In office August 2013 – October 2016

Personal details
- Born: Helen Elizabeth Ball; April 1961 (age 65)
- Profession: Police officer

Helen Ball QPM (born April 1961) is a British retired senior police officer. During part of her final year in policing, she served as Acting Deputy Commissioner of the Metropolitan Police Service. At a national level, she has been senior coordinator for counter terrorism policing (2013–2016) and strategic leadership adviser to the College of Policing (seconded 2016).

== Career ==
Ball became a police officer in 1987 as part of the Metropolitan Police, rising to the rank of Operational Command Unit Commander in 2007 and remaining there until 2010. She then transferred to Thames Valley Police as Assistant Chief Constable, leading on Crime and Criminal Justice, and remained there for two years before returning to the Met as Deputy Assistant Commissioner for Territorial Policing. She is a trustee of the government-funded charity Police Now.

In March 2019, Ball chaired a disciplinary hearing of PC Terry Malka, convicted of outraging public decency by masturbating while traveling on a train, which decided to issue a final written warning rather than sack him. As of February 2023, Malka was still serving with the force; this is being reviewed by the Metropolitan Police as part of an internal review into historic sex allegations.

In December 2021, after a coroner's hearing into the 2014–2015 murders by Stephen Port, Ball admitted that "a number of recent events" had damaged trust in the Metropolitan Police. Later that month, Ball chaired a misconduct panel that dismissed Jamie Rayner, a police constable already jailed for assaulting and strangling his partner during a "controlling and coercive" relationship. After the activist Kate Wilson won £229,471 civil damages from the Metropolitan Police in January 2022 for being deceived into a sexual relationship with an undercover police officer, Ball acknowledged the "gravity of the judgment" and that the police had breached Wilson's human rights.

Following the resignation of the Commissioner of the Metropolitan Police in April 2022, Ball acted as Deputy Commissioner while the Home Office and Mayor of London recruited a permanent replacement. In August 2022, she announced her intention to retire in October that year.

== Honours ==

Ribbon	Description	Notes
	Queen's Police Medal (QPM)	2014
	Queen Elizabeth II Golden Jubilee Medal	2002; UK version
	Queen Elizabeth II Diamond Jubilee Medal	2012; UK version
	Queen Elizabeth II Platinum Jubilee Medal	2022; UK version
	Police Long Service and Good Conduct Medal	
