= Crisis Negotiation Unit =

Crisis Negotiation Unit may refer to:

- FBI Crisis Negotiation Unit, US
- Singapore Police Force Crisis Negotiation Unit
- Hostage and Crisis Negotiation Unit, London, UK; a unit of the Serious and Organised Crime Command
