= Alan Brown (police officer) =

British police officer

Alan Brown QPM

Assistant Commissioner Service Improvement, Metropolitan Police
- In office 2005–2006

Personal details
- Born: Alan James Brown

Alan James Brown QPM is a retired British police officer who spent his entire career with the Metropolitan Police in London.

Brown joined the Metropolitan Police as a cadet in 1974. He was promoted to sergeant four years later and spent most of his career as a detective in the Criminal Investigation Department, rising through every rank to detective superintendent, with a year's stint as a uniformed inspector. He was promoted to chief superintendent in 1997 and became commander of the Brompton Division (Kensington and Chelsea).

Promoted to commander in November 1999, Brown headed the Serious and Organised Crime Group, including the Flying Squad, Operation Trident and SO19. He was promoted to deputy assistant commissioner on 9 June 2003 and appointed DAC Specialist Projects as deputy to the Assistant Commissioner Specialist Crime. He was awarded the Queen's Police Medal (QPM) in the 2004 New Year Honours. From 2004, Brown headed Operation Paget, the Metropolitan Police investigation into the death of Diana, Princess of Wales, in 1997.

On 26 January 2005, Brown was promoted to assistant commissioner and appointed Assistant Commissioner Service Improvement, a post he held until his retirement in 2006 and which included heading professional standards. He was duty assistant commissioner supervising policing across London on the day that Jean Charles de Menezes was shot. He continued to supervise Operation Paget until his departure from the Metropolitan Police.

Brown chaired the National Firearms Forensic Intelligence Database Working Group and was the Association of Chief Police Officers lead on hostage negotiation, being acknowledged as the national expert on the investigation of kidnap cases.

Following his retirement, Brown became group security director with Tesco in October 2006.

== Footnotes ==
Police appointments
Preceded by Unknown	Deputy Assistant Commissioner Specialist Projects, Metropolitan Police; 2003–2005	Succeeded by Unknown
Preceded by First incumbent	Assistant Commissioner Service Improvement, Metropolitan Police; 2005–2006	Succeeded by Last incumbent
