= Deputy Assistant =

Deputy Assistant may refer to:

- Deputy assistant commissioner
- Deputy Assistant to the President
- Deputy Assistant to the President for National Security Affairs
