= Neil Basu =

British police officer

Neil Basu QPM
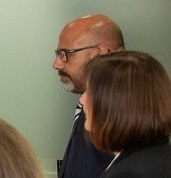
- Basu (rear) in 2019
- Born: 1968 (age 57–58); United Kingdom
- Police career
- Country: United Kingdom
- Department: Metropolitan Police
- Service years: 1992–2022
- Rank: Assistant Commissioner (Specialist Operations)
- Awards: Queen's Police Medal

Anil Kanti "Neil" Basu QPM (born 1968) is a British former senior police officer.

From March 2018 to September 2021, he served as assistant commissioner for Specialist Operations in the Metropolitan Police and the National Police Chiefs' Council lead for counter terrorism policing.

Basu left the Metropolitan Police at the end of November 2022.

== Career ==
In 1992, Basu became a police officer, and spent his career serving in the Metropolitan Police Service. He was the most senior serving British police officer of Asian heritage: his father was from Calcutta, India, and his mother was from Wales.

During the George Floyd protests in the UK, Basu spoke out about racism in policing, stating he was horrified by George Floyd's murder. Basu has stated he believes British policing is institutionally racist, criticising other senior British police officers for their reluctance to agree.

Following the resignation of Lynne Owens as director-general of the National Crime Agency, Basu was one of the final candidates under consideration to replace Owens, until the Home Office restarted the selection process in May 2022.

In 2025, Basu called for a full public inquiry into group-based child sexual exploitation. He stressed they should not become "elongated"; he argued that "political correctness" stopped the police from doing their jobs, especially with regard to protecting white working-class children from abuse.

== Personal life ==
Basu attended the University of Nottingham.

== Crime Agents ==
Basu is currently co-host of The Crime Agents podcast.

== Honours ==

Ribbon	Description	Notes
	Queen's Police Medal (QPM)	For Distinguished Service; 2016 Queen's Birthday Honours
	Queen Elizabeth II Golden Jubilee Medal	2002; UK version of this medal
	Queen Elizabeth II Diamond Jubilee Medal	2012; UK version of this medal
	Queen Elizabeth II Platinum Jubilee Medal	2022; UK version of this medal
	Police Long Service and Good Conduct Medal	

Police appointments
Preceded by Mark Rowley	Assistant Commissioner (Specialist Operations); Metropolitan Police Service	Succeeded by Matt Jukes
