= Ian Blair =

British police officer (1953–2025)

The Right Honourable The Lord Blair of Boughton QPM
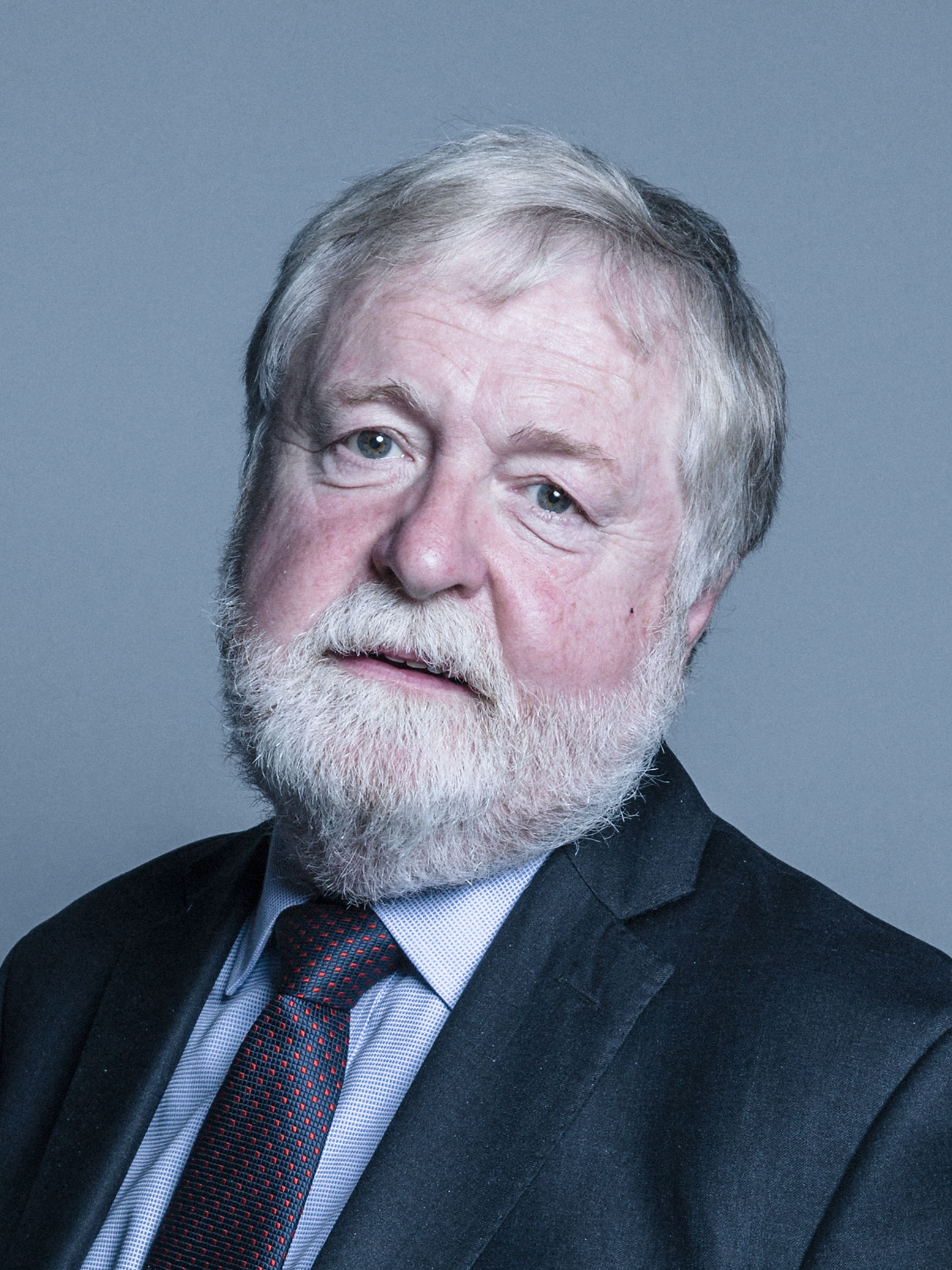
- Official portrait, 2018

Commissioner of Police of the Metropolis
- In office 1 January 2005 – 1 December 2008
- Monarch: Elizabeth II
- Prime Minister: Tony Blair; Gordon Brown
- Deputy: Paul Stephenson
- Preceded by: John Stevens
- Succeeded by: Paul Stephenson

Deputy Commissioner of Police of the Metropolis
- In office 2000–2005
- Leader: John Stevens
- Preceded by: John Stevens
- Succeeded by: Paul Stephenson

Member of the House of Lords
- Lord Temporal
- Life peerage 20 July 2010 – 9 July 2025

Personal details
- Born: Ian Warwick Blair; 19 March 1953 Chester, Cheshire, England
- Died: 9 July 2025 (aged 72)
- Party: None (crossbencher)
- Spouse: Felicity White (m. 1980)
- Children: 2
- Education: Christ Church, Oxford
- Profession: Police officer (1974–2008)

Ian Warwick Blair, Baron Blair of Boughton, QPM (19 March 1953 – 9 July 2025) was a British police officer who held the position of Commissioner of Police of the Metropolis from 2005 to 2008.

Blair joined the Metropolitan Police in 1974 under a graduate scheme, and served 10 years in London. As deputy chief constable of Thames Valley Police, he handled the protests over the construction of the Newbury bypass, and then became chief constable of Surrey Police, before being appointed deputy commissioner of the Metropolitan Police, and then commissioner in January 2005. His term of office saw the mistaken shooting of an innocent man, Jean Charles de Menezes, which resulted in contradictory police reports, and his comments on race caused some controversy among ethnic-minority police officers.

In October 2008 he announced that he would step down from the post in December after disagreements with Boris Johnson, the mayor of London. Blair was appointed a crossbench life peer in July 2010.

== Early life ==
Ian Blair was born in Chester to Jim and Sheila Blair on 19 March 1953. His father spent most of his career working for Lever Brothers, eventually rising to manage the dock at Port Sunlight in Merseyside. His mother was from Sheffield and her father had made a living as a steel merchant until he suffered major losses in the Great Depression in the 1930s. Both Blair and his brother, six years his senior, were sent to independent school at the expense of one of their father's brothers, who was a successful doctor. Blair's brother, Sandy, left school early to work for a solicitors' firm. His cousin was the historian John Fauvel.

Blair was sent to Wrekin College in Wellington, Shropshire. Jim Blair had been determined that his son would become a doctor—as his father (Ian's grandfather) had been, but Ian rebelled, refusing to take O-Level biology, knowing it would disqualify him from a potential medical career. He initially had no aspiration to go to university, as neither of his parents nor his brother had had a university education. However, he was inspired by a teacher at Wrekin to apply to Christ Church, Oxford. After a gap year, he went on to study English at the University of Oxford, graduating with a Bachelor of Arts (BA) degree in 1974.

== Early police career ==
Blair joined the Metropolitan Police in 1974, under the High Potential Development Scheme for Graduates. He joined as the rank of Constable, based in Soho, London, eventually over the next 10 years serving as a sergeant and inspector in both uniform and CID in central London.

In 1985 he wrote a book criticising the way police handled rape cases. In 1985 Blair was promoted to detective chief inspector in Kentish Town, north London. He was responsible for identifying the victims of the 1987 King's Cross fire. In 1988 he reached the rank of superintendent, heading a project designed to reorganise criminal investigations. He obtained the rank of chief superintendent in 1991, as staff officer in HM Inspectorate of Constabulary.

In 1994, he transferred to Thames Valley Police as assistant Chief Constable, later becoming deputy chief constable in 1997, and during the same year took charge of policing the protests over the construction of the Newbury bypass. In the 1999 New Year Honours, he was awarded the Queen's Police Medal (QPM) in recognition of his work as Chief Constable of Surrey Police. He was appointed a knight bachelor in the 2003 Birthday Honours for services to the police, and had his knighthood conferred on him by The Queen on 7 November 2003.

Blair was formerly deputy commissioner of the Metropolitan Police under the then commissioner Sir John Stevens, and before that chief constable of Surrey Police.

While serving as deputy commissioner, he gained a reputation for being a "thinking man's policeman". He called for more female, ethnic minority and gay recruits. In 2002 he publicly stated that "Society cannot duck the fact that most muggers are black", and in response the National Black Police Association stated that black recruits could be deterred by such comments.

== Commissioner ==
=== Shooting of Jean Charles de Menezes ===
Several months into his tenure, Jean Charles de Menezes was shot and killed by armed police who mistakenly believed he was a suicide bomber. After the shooting Blair telephoned the Chairman of the Independent Police Complaints Commission (IPCC) and wrote a letter to the Home Office stating that "the shooting that has just occurred at Stockwell is not to be referred to the IPCC and that they will be given no access to the scene at the present time".

Blair stated that a warning had been issued prior to the shooting. The IPCC held an investigation into what later turned out to be a false statement, and into allegations of attempts to delay an inquiry. On 2 August 2007 the IPCC announced its findings that the allegations against Blair could not be substantiated, instead placing the blame for misleading the public on Assistant Commissioner Andy Hayman, who had failed to report his suspicions that an innocent man had been killed, and had released contradictory statements to the press. After Blair learned that the shooting of de Menezes had been a case of mistaken identity, he briefly considered resigning.

During the investigation by the Independent Police Complaints Commission (IPCC) into the wrongful shooting, one of his Deputy Assistant Commissioners, Brian Paddick, stated just six hours after the shooting that a member of Blair's private office team had believed the wrong man had been targeted. This allegation was contradicted by New Scotland Yard, and Paddick said that this amounted to accusing him of lying. On 28 March 2006, Paddick accepted a statement from the Metropolitan Police that it "did not intend to imply" a senior officer had misled the probe into the shooting and that "any misunderstanding is regretted".

In June 2006, a leaked copy of the Independent Police Complaints Commission report sparked further criticism and calls to quit.

On 1 November 2007, a jury convicted the Metropolitan Police of violating health and safety laws, highlighting 19 "catastrophic errors" but said it was an "isolated breach under quite extraordinary circumstances". Blair rejected a vote of no confidence by the London Assembly a week later. Blair continued to receive the support of the Metropolitan Police Authority, the head of which said that he would not have accepted any resignation offered by Blair.

Blair is portrayed by actor Conleth Hill in the 2025 television drama series Suspect: The Shooting of Jean Charles de Menezes.

=== Operation Finnean ===
In 2005–06 Blair was involved in Operation Finnean, a £280,000 investigation into supermodel Kate Moss's alleged possession and distribution of a Class A drug. It has been alleged that the operation was systematically sabotaged by officers eager to undermine Blair and Tarique Ghaffur's high-profile stance on celebrity drug taking, and thereby erode their authority.

=== Bonus pay ===
In 2007 Blair was criticised by senior colleagues at New Scotland Yard after he sought a £25,000 performance bonus during criminal proceedings over the shooting of de Menezes, while on a salary of £228,000 and with rank-and-file officers facing the prospect of pay cuts.

=== Terrorism ===
In November 2005, a controversy about detention without charge proposals led to Blair becoming involved in allegations of the police being "politicised", when he and other senior police officers were known to have lobbied MPs to support Government proposals to hold terrorist suspects for 90 days.

After the failure of the Forest Gate raid, several sources once again called on Blair to resign. Prime Minister Tony Blair (no relation) confirmed his support for the Commissioner.

In a 2006 BBC Radio 4 interview, (Sir Ian) Blair stated that Islamic terrorism "is a far graver threat in terms of civilians than either the Cold War or the Second World War".

=== IT contract ===
The Metropolitan Police Authority requested on 28 July 2008 that Blair face an inquiry over a series of IT contracts with the Metropolitan Police worth £3 million won by Impact Plus, a consultancy owned by Andy Miller, who was a long-time friend of Blair. The commissioner denied any wrongdoing and said that he was "open and straightforward in informing both the Metropolitan Police Service and the MPA about [his] relationship [with Miller]". He said that he had set out in writing his connection with Miller and had no part in the evaluation process. It has however been reported in the press that on one occasion another company was turned down for a contract won by Impact Plus, despite its bid being a third of the winning offer. Miller and other Israeli IT providers are currently contracted in law enforcement for the "Bluelight" IT and electronics services.

=== No bid PR contract ===
In October 2008 it was reported that Blair had used public money to pay an estimated £15,000 to Impact Plus, owned by his friend of over 30 years, Andy Miller.

=== Race relations ===
In January 2006 he described the media as institutionally racist for its allegedly unbalanced coverage of crimes against white people, such as in the murder of Tom ap Rhys Pryce as compared to that given to crimes against those from ethnic minorities. As an example, he had referred to the murder of two young girls in Soham in 2002. He said "almost nobody" understood why it became such a big story. However, he was forced to issue an apology to the parents of Holly Wells and Jessica Chapman.

During a passing-out ceremony of the Metropolitan Police held in December 2006, an unnamed female Muslim police officer refused to shake hands with Blair, claiming religious grounds, and refused to have a picture taken with him, for fear of its being used for "propaganda purposes". According to Scotland Yard, Blair questioned the validity of her refusal.

In June 2008, Commander Shabir Hussain alleged being repeatedly rejected for promotion owing to racial discrimination, explicitly suggesting that Blair was using his influence to favour a "golden circle" of white officers and to turn down applications made by black and Asian candidates, who were better qualified for the promotion. In another case, the country's most senior Asian police officer Tarique Ghaffur was considering commencing an employment tribunal over being sidelined by Blair in Olympics security planning, and being asked to keep quiet about his concerns about the new 42 days detention laws for terror suspects. In a subsequent press conference, Ghaffur claimed that in a face-to-face meeting with Blair, the latter threatened to remove him from his post if he went ahead with his legal action.

=== Secretly taped telephone conversations ===
In March 2006, it was revealed that in late 2005 he had secretly taped several telephone conversations, including with the Attorney General, Lord Goldsmith. Blair received an unprecedented written warning from his bosses, but the chairman of the Metropolitan Police Authority, while describing his actions as "totally unacceptable", said it was not a resigning matter. The recording was not illegal and it was said to be simply to enable an accurate record to be taken for him in the absence of a note taker.

=== Single police force ===
Blair stated that he would prefer to see a single police force for the whole of London, an opinion shared by Ken Livingstone, with the functions of both the City of London Police and the British Transport Police absorbed by the Metropolitan Police. Already, the duties and functions of one police force (the Royal Parks Constabulary) have been taken by the Met. However, both the City of London Police and BTP have expressed their strong objections to this proposal, while the Home Office has stated that reorganisation of policing in London is not on their agenda. The publication of reviews into the operation of the British Transport Police, and the national review of fraud by the Attorney General, combined with the ending of the police merger proposals for England and Wales, appear to rule out any possibility of police mergers in London for the foreseeable future.

=== Brian Haw ===
Blair was criticised when 78 police officers were involved in an operation to confiscate placards displayed by protester Brian Haw. After he initially told the Metropolitan Police Authority that the operation had cost £7,200, it later emerged that it cost £27,000.

=== Haringey comments ===
In 2006, in comments to The Times, Blair claimed that the London Borough of Haringey was a safe enough place to leave doors unlocked. Metropolitan Police Authority member Damian Hockney described Blair's remarks as "truly extraordinary".

=== Unsupported claims of involvement in the Balcombe Street siege ===
The Guardian published on 30 March 2007 a story detailing inconsistencies between an account Blair gave of his involvement in the Balcombe Street Siege on the night of 6 December 1975, and the recollections of others involved at the time. In a 2006 interview, Blair had stated: "We turned the corner, and there is the car ... It was a very defining moment. I think I spent the next half an hour pretending to be a bush. They got out of the car and started firing at us. It is an interesting experience being fired at when you have absolutely nothing to fire back with ... I loved it. I loved the job."

Steve Moysey, a U.S.-based British academic, who researched and published a detailed history of the IRA campaign in London, and the resulting Balcombe Street siege, was puzzled by apparent inconsistencies and contacted John Purnell, who with his partner Phil McVeigh, were the first policemen to confront the Balcombe Street gang. Purnell said: "I've never for one second associated Ian Blair with Balcombe Street in any shape or form, and his account of seeing [the terrorists] get out of the car and being shot at as they got out of the car is totally impossible." Blair admitted he had not personally seen the IRA men getting out of their car and opening fire, and stated: "I didn't see it and I didn't say I saw it."

He added he had briefly joined the car chase after encountering the IRA car in Park Street near the original shooting. "We turned into Park Street and there were two or three vehicles in front of us going extremely fast." He believed one was the "bandit car" and another may have been a taxi, but Blair and his sergeant were not able to keep up "because we were driving a Hillman Hunter which has a top speed of 25mph minus". The actual top speed of the least powerful Hillman Hunter in 1975 was 83 mph and the top speed of a 70s-era taxi was 60 mph. According to Purnell: "There was no chase. It was just going along at a normal speed. [The IRA men] actually said later they didn't know they were being followed."

=== Resignation ===
In May 2008, it was reported in the press that Blair's contract as Commissioner of the Metropolitan Police Service would not be renewed when it expired in 2010.

On 2 October 2008, Blair announced he would resign as Metropolitan Police Commissioner, with effect from 1 December 2008. He blamed a lack of support from London mayor Boris Johnson, saying that "without the mayor's backing I do not think I can continue". Home Secretary Jacqui Smith and Prime Minister Gordon Brown paid tribute to Blair's service. Sir Paul Stephenson took over on 28 November 2008. Blair was entitled to a full police pension, estimated to be worth about £160,000 per year, based on his £240,000 commissioner's salary.

== Peerage and the House of Lords ==
In May 2010, Blair was appointed a crossbench life peer, and was created Baron Blair of Boughton, of Boughton in the County of Cheshire on 20 July 2010. He was a member of the Joint Committee on the Draft Domestic Abuse Bill.

== Commissions and enquiries ==
In 2010, Blair served on the Commission on Assisted Dying run by Demos, subsequently speaking in favour of changing the law. In the same year, along with Roma Hooper, Paul McDowell, Dame Anne Owers, Javed Khan, John Thornhill and Peter Oborne, he formed an investigative panel which led the year-long Community or Custody National Enquiry investigating the effectiveness of community sentencing over short-term prison sentences for low-level offences.

== Death ==
Blair died following an illness on 9 July 2025, at the age of 72.

== Ranks and honours ==
- 1974: Police Constable
- 1985: Detective Chief Inspector
- 1988: Superintendent
- 1991: Chief Superintendent
- 1994: Assistant Chief Constable
- 1997: Deputy Chief Constable
- 1998: Chief Constable
- 2000: Deputy Commissioner
- 2005: Commissioner

Blair would have held the ranks of Police Constable, Police Sergeant and Inspector between 1974 and 1985, but the dates of his appointments are unknown. A photograph in his autobiography, Policing Controversy, shows him as a uniformed sergeant in 1977.

Knight Bachelor	2003 Birthday Honours
Officer of the Order of St John	2005
Queen's Police Medal	1999 New Year Honours
Queen Elizabeth II Golden Jubilee Medal	2002
Police Long Service and Good Conduct Medal	

== Bibliography ==
- Investigating Rape: A New Approach for Police (1985) – via – Google books

Police appointments
Preceded by Sir John Stevens	Deputy Commissioner of Police of the Metropolis; 2000–2005	Succeeded by Sir Paul Stephenson
Preceded by Sir John Stevens	Commissioner of Police of the Metropolis; 2005–2008	Succeeded by Sir Paul Stephenson
