= Mark Rowley (police officer) =

British police officer (born 1964)

Sir Mark Rowley QPM
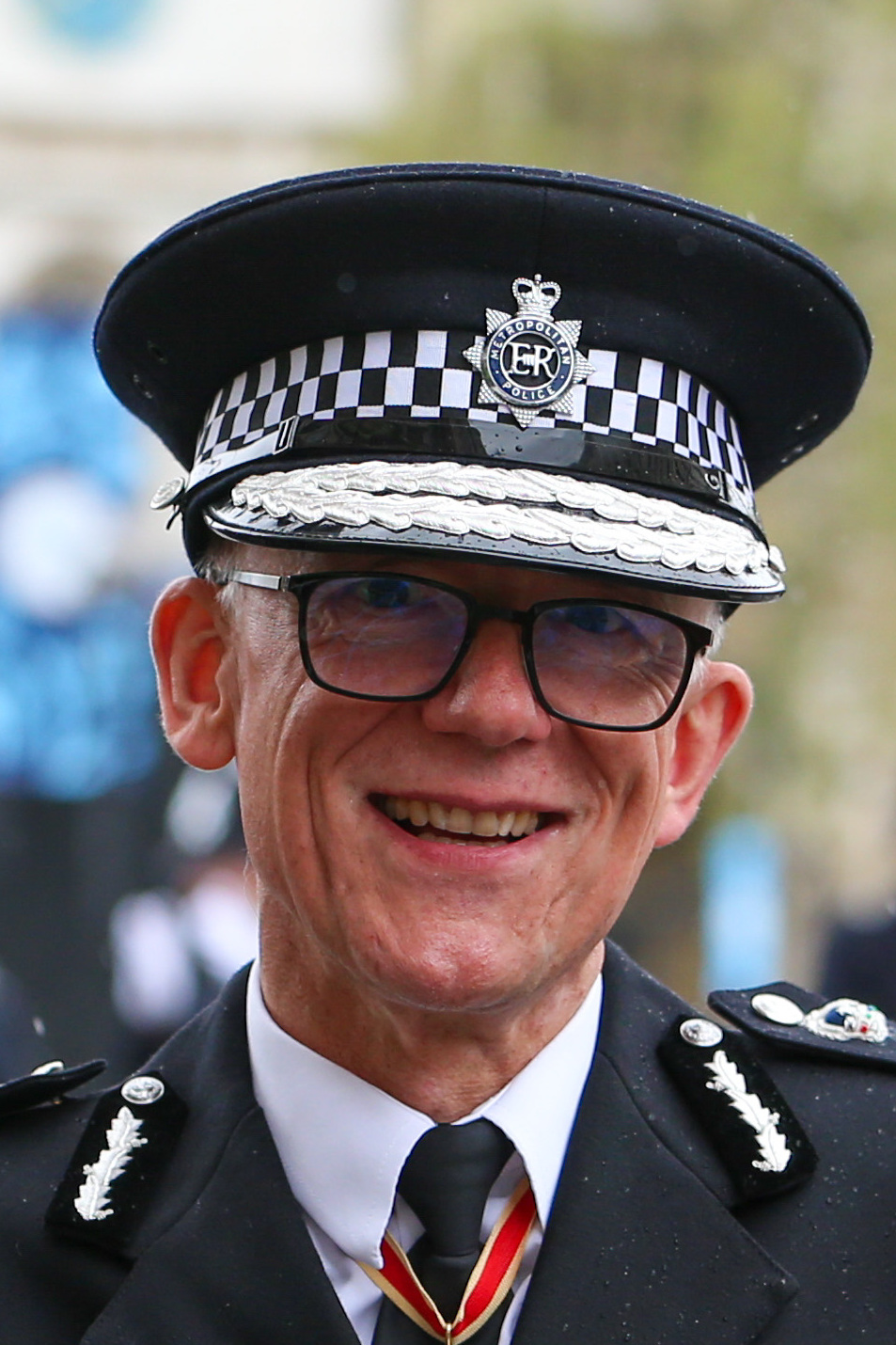
- Rowley in 2023

Commissioner of Police of the Metropolis
- Incumbent
- Assumed office 12 September 2022
- Monarch: Charles III
- Deputy: Dame Lynne Owens (2023–2025); Matt Jukes (2025–present)
- Home Secretary: Suella Braverman; Grant Shapps; Suella Braverman; James Cleverly; Yvette Cooper; Shabana Mahmood
- Mayor: Sadiq Khan
- Preceded by: Dame Cressida Dick (Note: Stephen House acted from 10 April 2022 to 12 September 2022)

Assistant Commissioner for Specialist Operations
- In office 2014–2018
- Preceded by: Cressida Dick
- Succeeded by: Neil Basu

Assistant Commissioner for Specialist Crime and Operations
- In office 2011–2014
- Preceded by: Lynne Owens

Chief Constable of Surrey Police
- In office 2009–2011
- Preceded by: Bob Quick
- Succeeded by: Lynne Owens

Personal details
- Born: Mark Peter Rowley; November 1964 (age 61) Birmingham, Warwickshire, England
- Education: St Catharine's College, Cambridge
- Years active: 1987–2018; 2022–present
- Police career
- Force: Metropolitan Police Service
- Rank: Commissioner
- Awards: Knight Bachelor, QPM

Sir Mark Peter Rowley (/ˈroʊli/; born November 1964) is a British police officer who has been the Commissioner of Police of the Metropolis since September 2022.

He was the Assistant Commissioner of Police of the Metropolis for Specialist Operations of the Metropolitan Police Service and the concurrent Chair of the National Police Chiefs' Council Counter-Terrorism Coordination Committee and National Lead for Counter Terrorism Policing. He was previously Chief Constable of Surrey Police (2009–2011), and also served as Acting Deputy Commissioner of the Metropolitan Police between February 2017 and April 2017. He retired from the police in March 2018.

In July 2022, it was announced that he would return to policing in the role of Commissioner of Police of the Metropolis, replacing former Commissioner Dame Cressida Dick. He was sworn in as Commissioner on 12 September 2022.

== Early life ==
Rowley was born in Birmingham. His father ran a small engineering business; his mother was a teacher.

He was educated at Handsworth Grammar School for Boys, an all boys state grammar school in Handsworth, Birmingham. In 1983, he matriculated into St Catharine's College, Cambridge. Having studied mathematics, he graduated with a Bachelor of Arts (BA) degree in 1986.

== Career ==
In 1987, Rowley began his policing career when he joined West Midlands Police as a constable. His early career centred on Birmingham, where he undertook a broad range of both uniformed and detective roles.

He joined the National Criminal Intelligence Service as a Detective Superintendent. During his time serving in the NCIS, he led the development of covert operations to combat organised crime. In 2000, he joined Surrey Police as a senior officer when he was appointed Chief Superintendent in command of the West Surrey Basic Command Unit. For five years, he led the investigation into the murder of Milly Dowler until 2011.

In November 2003, he was promoted to Assistant Chief Constable. His responsibilities originally included local policing, crime reduction and criminal justice, but in 2005 his role changed and he became responsible for major and organised crime. He was promoted to Deputy Chief Constable in 2007. He served as temporary Chief Constable of Surrey Police from March 2008. He was appointed Chief Constable of the force in March 2009. From 2009 to 2011, he was a member of the Association of Chief Police Officers Cabinet.

He reached the short list of four candidates to become head of the new National Crime Agency, but lost out to Keith Bristow. He joined the Metropolitan Police Service as Assistant Commissioner for Specialist Operations in October 2011.

In January 2018, Rowley announced he would retire from the police in March. He was succeeded by Neil Basu.

In April 2022, he co-authored a counter-terrorism thriller, The Sleep of Reason, with journalist David Derbyshire.

=== Commissioner of the Metropolitan Police ===
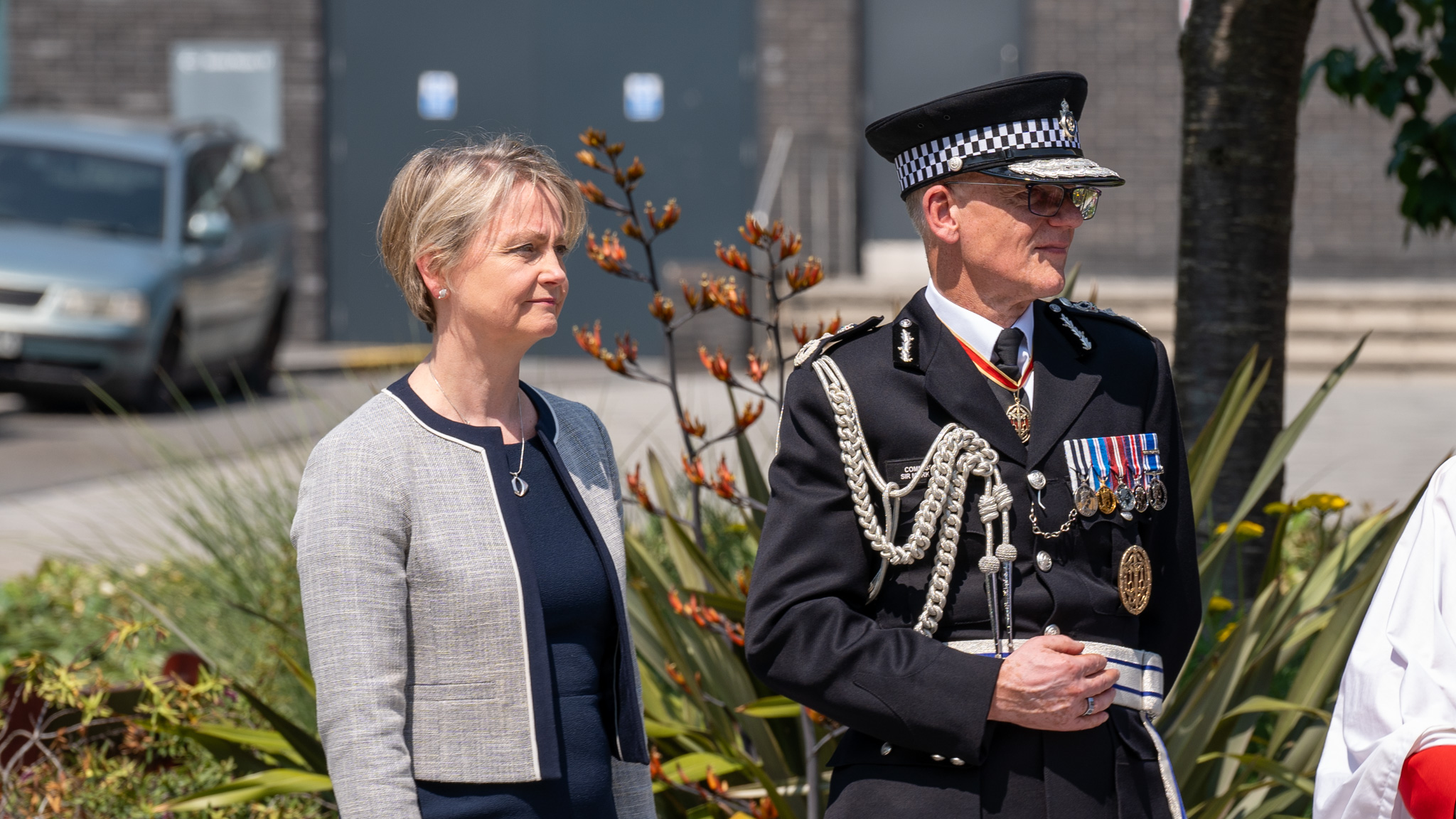
Rowley (right) with Home Secretary Yvette Cooper in 2025

On 8 July 2022, it was announced that Rowley would be the next Commissioner of the Metropolitan Police, in succession to Cressida Dick. He was sworn in on 12 September 2022. He was formally appointed by the King on 20 September 2022 via a warrant under the royal sign-manual.

Shortly after assuming office, he oversaw the security operation of the state funeral of Elizabeth II, the largest security operation ever mounted in the UK. In May 2023, he oversaw the coronation of Charles III and Camilla. On 7 November 2023, he refused to ban the pro-Palestinian march in London, saying that the organisers of the march had shown "complete willingness to stay away from the Cenotaph and Whitehall and have no intention of disrupting the nation's remembrance events".

In April 2024, Rowley faced calls to resign after Met officers described Campaign Against Antisemitism CEO Gideon Falter as "openly Jewish" during a request for him to move away from a pro-Palestinian protest. Some members of the Metropolitan Police suspected that Falter was looking for confrontation with the protesters, which Falter denies, and was seeking to catch out the Met Police. Rowley admitted that some of the words exchanged were "clumsy and offensive", but stated that the officers actions were "professional". Following the incident Rowley reportedly had the "full confidence" of then Home Secretary James Cleverly and London Mayor Sadiq Khan but Prime Minister Rishi Sunak said Rowley needed to regain “confidence and trust” with the Jewish community and also had to persuade the public that officers in future will not “[tolerate] behaviour that we would all collectively deem unacceptable” in order to retain his support.

In August 2024 amid then ongoing far-right riots across Britain, Rowley was caught on camera grabbing a Sky News journalist's mic and throwing it to the ground after being asked if the Met would "end two-tier policing".

A Sky News reporter asked Rowley in August 2024 about posts made by Elon Musk. Rowley responded: "We will throw the full force of the law at people and whether you're in this country committing crimes on the streets or committing crimes from further afield online we will come after you."

== Honours ==

Knight Bachelor	9 June 2018
Queen's Police Medal	31 December 2010
Queen Elizabeth II Golden Jubilee Medal	2002
Queen Elizabeth II Diamond Jubilee Medal	2012
King Charles III Coronation Medal	2023
Police Long Service and Good Conduct Medal	2009

== Notes ==
Police appointments
Preceded by Bob Quick	Chief Constable of Surrey Police; 2009–2011	Succeeded by Lynne Owens
Preceded by Lynne Owens	Assistant Commissioner (Specialist Crime and Operations); Metropolitan Police Service; 2011–2014	Abolished
Preceded by Cressida Dick	Assistant Commissioner (Specialist Operations); Metropolitan Police Service; 2014–2018	Succeeded by Neil Basu
Preceded by Stephen House (acting)	Commissioner of Police of the Metropolis; 2022–present	Incumbent
