= Serious and Organised Crime Command =

The Serious and Organised Crime Command (SCD7 – Specialist Crime Directorate 7) was a unit of the Metropolitan Police in Greater London, United Kingdom. It was part of the Specialist Crime Directorate (now Specialist Crime & Operations (SC&O) – created by the merger of Specialist Crime Directorate and Central Operations) and is today part of Met Operations 7 (MO7). It was divided into 10 units:

- Kidnap Unit – provided fast responses to life-threatening crimes in action, for example extortion, blackmail or kidnap for ransom where the hostage has not been recovered.
- Project Team – conducted operations against organised crime, (cross-London, national or international) at National Intelligence Model levels 2–3. This included proactive contracts to arrest major drugs suppliers, multi-dimensional crime groups, including ethnically composed gangs, and large-scale firearms trafficking.
- Branch Intelligence Unit – provided intelligence for the Serious and Organised Crime Group
- Flying Squad – investigated robberies (whether armed or not) of cash in transit companies, building societies, betting offices, post offices, jewellers, casinos and banks. They also investigated all robberies at commercial premises where a firearm was produced or intimated.
- Hostage and Crisis Negotiation Unit – provideed negotiators for all hostage situations, and delivered Hostage and Crisis Negotiation training nationally and internationally.
- Central Task Force – investigated class A drug dealers, firearms traffickers and any other criminal group affecting two or more London Boroughs, particularly criminal networks.
- Middle Market Drugs Partnership – a joint partnership between the Serious and Organised Crime Group and National Crime Agency. Investigated class A drug supply in London within minimum levels of 1/2 kg of heroin or 1 kg of cocaine, or where an operation would exceed 8 weeks.
- Cultural and Communities Research Unit – provided 24-hour support with immediate access to staff of the Met Police that had a broad range of life skills, such as knowledge of a community, language, culture, religion, trade or hobby.
- Operation Grafton – investigated criminal networks linked to crime with a value more than £10,000 in and around Heathrow Airport, including networks operating across force boundaries.
- Specialist Intelligence Service – provided intelligence for the Project Teams.
