= Keith Bristow =

British Chief Constable

Keith Bristow QPM
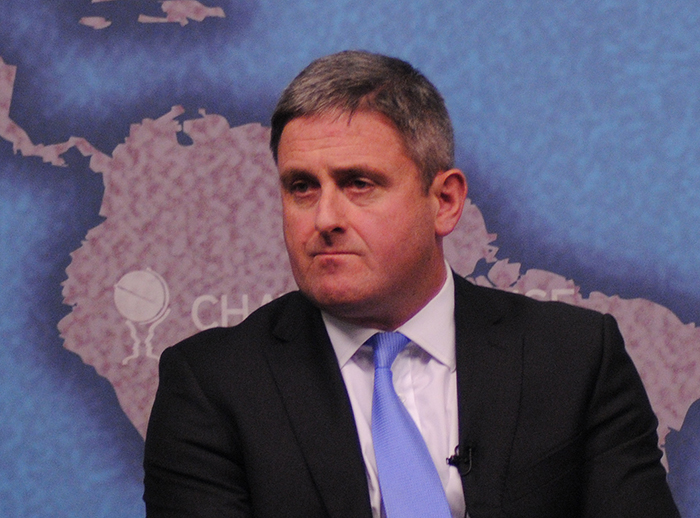
- Bristow at Chatham House in 2013

Director-General of the National Crime Agency
- In office October 2013 – January 2016
- Appointed by: Theresa May
- Deputy: Phil Gormley
- Preceded by: Office created
- Succeeded by: Lynne Owens

Chief Constable of Warwickshire Police
- In office 2006–2011
- Preceded by: John Burbeck
- Succeeded by: Andy Parker

Personal details
- Born: Keith Bristow; 1967 (age 58–59) Wolverhampton, United Kingdom
- Profession: Police officer

Keith Bristow QPM served as the first Director-General of the National Crime Agency from 2011 to 2016. He was formerly the Chief Constable of Warwickshire Police, and was appointed in October 2011 to oversee the creation of the NCA and, following its launch in 2013, led the organisation in its mission to cut serious and organised crime in the UK. Between 2011 and 2013, Bristow built and designed the agency, from concept to full operational crime-fighting, working closely with the Government, global partners and participating in the UK National Security Council. He is the former Vice Chairman of Arcanum, a global strategic intelligence company and a subsidiary of Magellan Investment Holdings and currently Executive Chairman of Heligan Group.

== Early career ==
Bristow joined West Mercia Constabulary as a cadet and served in uniformed and Criminal Investigation Department roles. In 1997, as a Detective Chief Inspector, he was appointed staff officer to the president of the Association of Chief Police Officers (ACPO). In 1998 he was promoted Detective Superintendent and seconded to the West Midlands Police Major Investigation Team, later transferring to the force permanently, where he served as operations manager and director of intelligence. Promoted to Chief Superintendent, he commanded an operational command unit in Birmingham.

== Chief officer ==
In 2002, he was promoted Assistant Chief Constable and became a director of the National Criminal Intelligence Service. In 2005, he was appointed Deputy Chief Constable of Warwickshire Police and in July 2006 became Chief Constable.

He is also chair of the G8 Law Enforcement Group and from 2009 to 2011 was head of crime at ACPO, having previously been head of violence and public protection and of criminal use of firearms. He was the first British graduate of the European Top Senior Police Officer Course and holds a master's degree in organisational development, a postgraduate diploma in management studies, and a diploma in applied criminology. As an influential voice on contemporary law enforcement issues, he has a substantial record of keynote addresses both domestically and internationally. Of special note, in 2012 Bristow delivered the annual James Smart Lecture 'joined up public protection' and in 2014 the annual Police Foundation lecture 'policing with consent in the digital age'.

In October 2011, Home Secretary Theresa May, announced that Bristow would head the new National Crime Agency; Bristow spent two years designing and building the agency, including merging multiple organisations. The agency began operations two years later in October 2013.

In 2014 and 2015, he chaired the Five Eyes Law Enforcement Group (FELEG), a partnership between UK, US, Australia, Canada and New Zealand which seeks to reduce the international threat and impact of organised crime.

As of 2015, Bristow was paid a salary of £225,000 by the agency, making him one of the 328 most highly paid people in the British public sector at that time. On 26 November 2015, it was announced that he would be standing down in January 2016. He was succeeded by Lynne Owens, the former Chief Constable of Surrey Police, on 4 January 2016.

Bristow was awarded the Queen's Police Medal (QPM) in the 2008 Birthday Honours.

== Arcanum ==
On January 20, 2016, Bristow was appointed as a senior advisor to Arcanum Global a Private Intelligence Agency. Acting on behalf of Wirecard, an Arcanum client, in 2019 Bristow is reported to have met the Financial Conduct Authority to open an investigation into the Financial Times for their reporting on Wirecard's financial irregularities. Executives at Wirecard had attempted to portray Financial Times investigative journalists Paul Murphy and Dan McCrum as having been paid by short sellers to bring down the company. Wirecard collapsed in 2020, with €1.9 billion missing from its accounts.

== Honours ==

Ribbon	Description	Notes
	Queen's Police Medal (QPM)	2008
	Queen Elizabeth II Golden Jubilee Medal	2002; UK Version of this Medal
	Queen Elizabeth II Diamond Jubilee Medal	2012; UK Version of this Medal
	Police Long Service and Good Conduct Medal	

== Footnotes ==
Police appointments
Unknown	Deputy Chief Constable of Warwickshire Police; 2005–2006	Succeeded by Andy Parker
Preceded by John Burbeck	Chief Constable of Warwickshire Police; 2006–2011	Succeeded by Andy Parker
New office	Director of the National Crime Agency; 2013–2016	Succeeded by Lynne Owens
