= Deputy assistant commissioner =

Senior English law-enforcement role

DCC

Deputy assistant commissioner (DAC), formally Deputy Assistant Commissioner of Police of the Metropolis, is a rank in London's Metropolitan Police Service between assistant commissioner and commander. It is equivalent to deputy chief constable in other British police forces and wears the same insignia: a pip above crossed tipstaves within a wreath.

The rank was introduced in 1919 as an intermediate rank between assistant commissioner and (the Metropolitan Police rank of) chief constable. Deputy assistant commissioners were always warranted constables, as opposed to the higher ranks who were instead sworn as magistrates. In 1946 the rank was split, with senior DACs continuing to hold the rank and junior DACs (the four district commanders and the deputy to the assistant commissioner "C" in the Criminal Investigation Department) being regraded to the new rank of commander.

The rank was abolished on 1 April 1995 following recommendations made in the Sheehy Report, later confirmed by the Police Act 1996, although officers already holding the rank could continue to hold it. Senior commanders were in the meantime sometimes given the designation "deputy to assistant commissioner". The Home Office officially reintroduced the rank on 1 January 2002 under the terms of the Criminal Justice and Police Act 2001.

All the deputy assistant commissioners initially held senior staff jobs at Scotland Yard. In 1933, command of the four Districts, formerly held by chief constables, was given to deputy assistant commissioners, with the chief constables remaining as their deputies. District commanders were regraded to commander in 1946, but later regained DAC rank, holding it until 1995, by which time there were eight areas (as the districts had been renamed). These were reorganised into five and handed over to the assistant commissioners.

== List ==
Officer	Portfolio	Term start	Term end	References
James Harman	Operations and Performance		Incumbent	
Kevin Southworth	Local Policing		Incumbent	
Louise Puddefoot	Local Policing		Incumbent	
Hayley Stewart	Specialist Crime		Incumbent	
Ben Russell	Intelligence		Incumbent	
Jon Savell	Security and Protection		Incumbent	
Vicki Evans	Senior National Coordinator		Incumbent	
Andy Valentine	Professional Standards		Incumbent	
Carl Galvin	Trust and Legitimacy		Incumbent	
Matt Twist		April 2018	2022	
Lucy D'Orsi	Security and Protection	December 2016	February 2021	
Neil Basu	Security and Protection	2016	2018	
Graham McNulty	Specialist Crime	2016		
Steve Rodhouse	Crime Operations	2016	2018	
Mark Rowley		2016	2017	
Peter Terry	Intelligence, Tasking and Operations	2016		
Helen Ball	Territorial Policing	2012	2013	
Lynne Owens	Territorial Policing	April 2009	December 2010	
Alf Hitchcock	Territorial Policing	2006	2007	
Alan Brown	Specialist Projects	9 June 2003	26 January 2005	
Barbara Wilding	Security and Protection	1998	2002	
John Howley	Security	April 1992	August 1996	
Peter Phelan	Security	January 1988	December 1991	
Simon Crawshaw	Security	August 1985	June 1987	
Colin Hewett	Security	November 1980	July 1985	
Robert Bryan	Security	July 1977	September 1980	
Victor Gilbert	Security	January 1973	February 1977	
Ferguson Smith	Security	June 1969	June 1972	
