= Gold–silver–bronze command structure =

Command hierarchy used by UK emergency services

Gold	Strategic
Silver	Tactical
Bronze	Operational

A gold–silver–bronze command structure is a command hierarchy used for major operations by the emergency services of the United Kingdom.

Some practitioners use the term strategic–tactical–operational command structure instead, but the different categories are equivalent. In some cases, the national government (via the Cabinet Office Briefing Rooms) will assume ultimate control and act as a "platinum" level.

The effectiveness of elements of interoperability and communications with this structure have been called into question by the Pollock Report of 2013.

== See also ==
- Emergency management
- Incident command system
- Control of Major Accident Hazards Regulations 1999
