= Specialist Crime Directorate (Metropolitan Police) =

One of the main branches of London's Police Service

The Specialist Crime Directorate (SCD) was one of the main branches of London's Metropolitan Police Service. Formed in November 2002, it provided highly visible specialist policing services across the whole of London. Assistant Commissioner Mark Rowley had previously led the directorate but it was later led by Assistant Commissioner Cressida Dick. The Directorate led national police agency with regard to specialist crime investigations such as e-crime, sex crimes (paedophile unit) or kidnappings, hostage-taking and contract killings.

The Specialist Crime Directorate was merged with Central Operations to create Specialist Crime & Operations, which was itself later split in 2018, with Operations now in Met Operations and Specialist Crime part of Frontline Policing Headquarters within Frontline Policing.

It encompassed several departments:

- Air Support Unit
- Child Abuse Investigation Command
- Computer Crime and Cybercrime
- Covert Policing
- Crime Academy
- Dog support unit
- Emergency Preparedness
- Film Unit
- Fingerprint Services
- Forensic Services
- Homicide and Serious Crime
- Human Exploitation
- Marine Policing
- Met Intelligence Bureau
- Mounted Branch
- Overseas Visitors Registration
- Rape & Serious Sexual Assault
- Serious and Organised Crime
- Specialist & Economic Crime
- Territorial Support Group
- Traffic Criminal Justice Unit
- Traffic Operational Command
- Trident Gang Crime Command
