= Stop and search =

Stop and search or Stop and frisk is a term used to describe the powers of the police to search a person, place or object without first making an arrest.

Examples in specific jurisdictions include:

- Powers of the police in England and Wales § Search without arrest in England and Wales
- Powers of the police in Scotland § Search without a warrant in Scotland
- Terry stop, in the United States
