= Commissioner of Police of the Metropolis =

Head of London's Metropolitan Police Service

- Epaulette

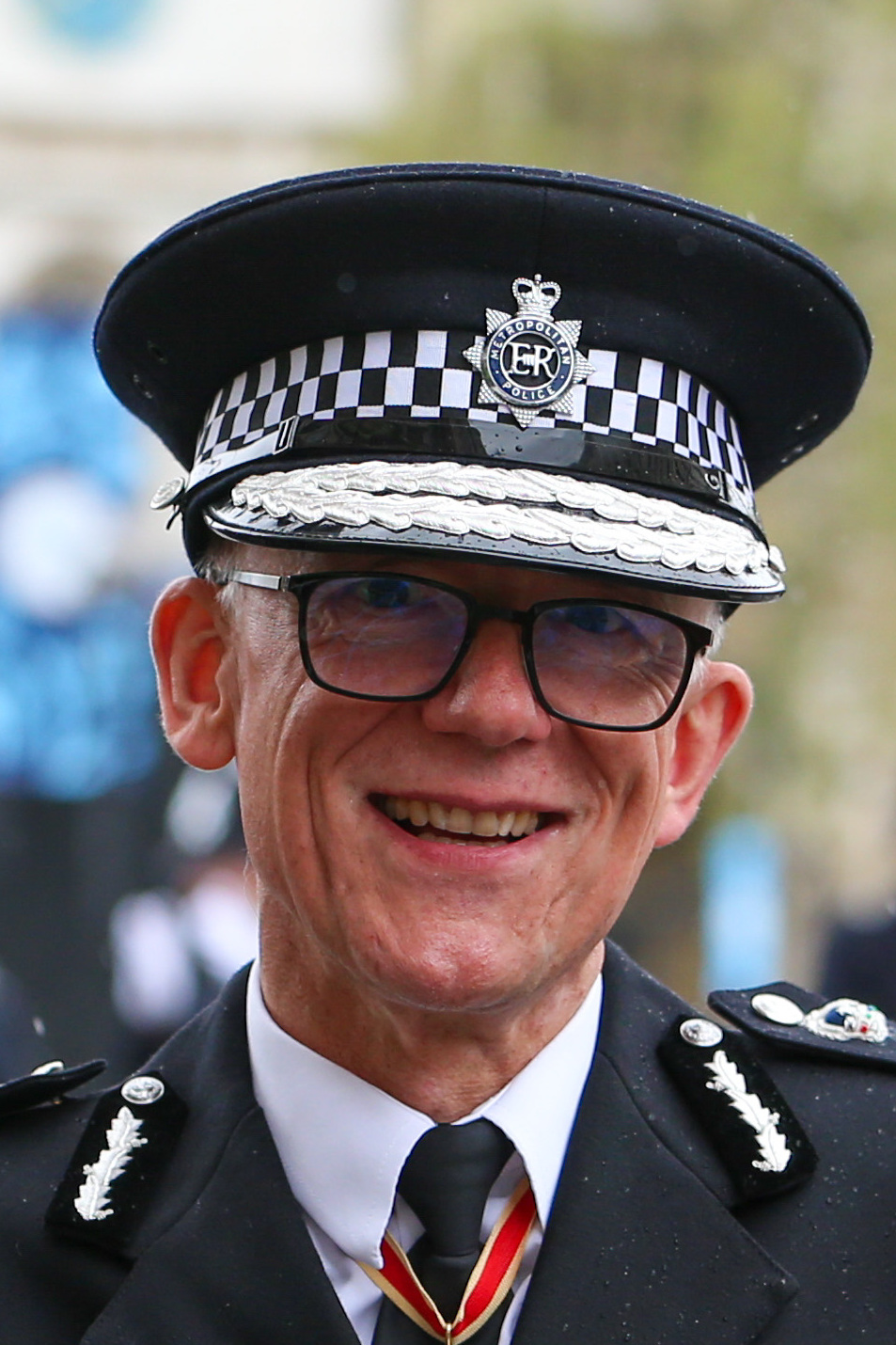
- Incumbent; Sir Mark Rowley since 12 September 2022
- Reports to: Home Secretary; Mayor of London
- Appointer: Monarch on advice of the Home Secretary
- Term length: At His Majesty's pleasure
- Formation: 1829
- Deputy: Deputy Commissioner of Police of the Metropolis
- Salary: £292,938 per annum
- Website: www.met.police.uk

The Commissioner of Police of the Metropolis is the head of London's Metropolitan Police Service. Sir Mark Rowley was appointed to the post on 8 July 2022 after Dame Cressida Dick announced her resignation in February 2022.

The rank of Commissioner of the Metropolitan Police is generally regarded as the highest in British policing. Although authority is generally confined to the Metropolitan Police Service's area of operation, the Metropolitan Police District, the Metropolitan Police also has certain national responsibilities such as leading counter-terrorism policing and protection of the royal family and senior members of the government.

The commissioner is directly accountable to the Home Secretary, the Mayor's Office for Policing and Crime, and the mayor of London.

== History ==
The post of commissioner was created by the Metropolitan Police Act 1829. For the force's first ten years, commissioners were known as "justices of the peace of the counties of Middlesex, Surrey, Hertford, Essex, and Kent, and of all the liberties therein". (Note: Section 1, 1829 Act) Section 4 of the Metropolitan Police Act 1839 first gave the post the title of Commissioner, and it was held jointly by two men until the Metropolitan Police Act 1856 merged these into a single post. The Commissioners were not appointed as sworn constables until the Administration of Justice Act 1973 (Note: Section 1(9)(a) as in para 10, Schedule 1 to the Act), which came into force 1 April 1974 by section 20 (commencement)) amended the phrase on justices of the peace in Section 1 of the 1829 Act to "a Commissioner of Police of the Metropolis to execute the duties of chief officer of the [Metropolitan Police]".

The insignia of rank is a crown above a Bath Star, known as a "pip", above crossed tipstaves within a wreath. This badge is all but unique within the British police, shared only with the Commissioner of the City of London Police, the smallest territorial police force, and HM Chief Inspector of Constabulary. Like all chief officer ranks in the British police, commissioners wear gorget patches on the collars of their tunics. The gorget patches are similar to those worn by generals, aside from being of silver-on-black instead of the Army's gold-on-red.

At one time, the commissioners were either retired military officers or civil servants. Sir John Nott-Bower, who served as commissioner from 1953 to 1958, was the first career police officer to hold the post, despite several previous commissioners having served in senior administrative positions in colonial forces and the Metropolitan Police itself. Nott-Bower's successor Sir Joseph Simpson was the first commissioner to have started his career at the lowest rank of constable. However, Sir Robert Mark, appointed in 1972, was the first to have risen through all the ranks from the lowest to the highest, as all his successors have done.

Applicants are appointed to the post by the monarch, following a recommendation by the Home Secretary under the Police Reform and Social Responsibility Act 2011, who must have regard to any recommendations made by the Mayor's Office for Policing and Crime.

== Eligibility and accountability ==
The post of commissioner is "accountable to the Home Secretary; to the Mayor's Office for Policing and Crime" and must answer to Londoners and the public nationally."

The commissioner may be suspended or removed by the Mayor's Office for Policing and Crime with the approval of the Home Secretary.

=== Eligibility requirements ===
In 2008 and 2011, applicants to the post of commissioner had to be British citizens (in 2008 this was explicitly stated to be because of the role of the commissioner in national security), and be "serving UK chief constables or of equivalent UK ranks and above, or have recent experience at these levels". In contrast, applicants in 2018 were told that the post of commissioner was "non reserved" (seemingly a reference to the Aliens' Employment Act 1955 (as amended)) and that there were no specific restrictions on nationality.

The requirement to be a British national blocked the appointment of non-British commissioners in the past, such as in August 2011, when Prime Minister David Cameron wanted former Los Angeles Police Department Chief Bill Bratton to become the new commissioner. However, in 2014 section 42 of the Police Reform and Social Responsibility Act 2011 was amended by section 140 of the Anti-Social Behaviour, Crime and Policing Act 2014, whereby a person who is or has been "a constable in any part of the United Kingdom" or "a police officer in an approved overseas police force, of at least the approved rank" could be appointed. Determinations made in 2018 under Regulation 11 of the Police Regulations 2003 restrict the constables eligible for appointment to those who are serving, or have served, in the ranks of assistant chief constable, commander, or a more senior rank in a police force in any part of the United Kingdom. The Appointment of Chief Officers of Police (Overseas Police Forces) Regulations 2014 approve certain Australian, Canadian, New Zealand and US police forces and ranks.

=== Selection process ===
The selection process in 2017, to select Sir Bernard Hogan-Howe's successor, involved the candidates undergoing psychometric testing in addition to interviews with the Home Secretary, Mayor of London and Policing Minister. The process is conducted in private and the Home Office has specifically called for a "news blackout". The discussion and public profile of the candidates was limited to speculation and rumour, with the Home Office refusing to even confirm the shortlisted candidates covered in the media.

The Centre for Public Safety has recommended the selection process be reformed, to provide opportunities for greater public, community and workforce engagement in the process. In particular, suggesting a series of community interview panels and a public candidate forum – though they maintain that the final decision should still rest with the Home Secretary.

== List of commissioners ==
#	From	To	Military rank (if applicable)	Name	Notes
1	1829	1850	Lieutenant-Colonel	Sir Charles Rowan	First Joint Commissioner
2	1829	1868	-	Sir Richard Mayne	Second Joint Commissioner (1829–1850), then First Joint Commissioner (1850–1855) and finally Commissioner (1855–1868)
3	1850	1855	Captain	William Hay	Second Joint Commissioner
4	1868	1869	Lieutenant-Colonel	Douglas Labalmondière	Acting
5	1869	1886	Lieutenant-Colonel	Sir Edmund Henderson	
6	1886	1888	Major-General	Sir Charles Warren	Later returned to military duties
7	1888	1890	-	James Monro	Senior civil servant before becoming Assistant Commissioner (Crime) and then Commissioner
8	1890	1903	Colonel	Sir Edward Bradford	
9	1903	1918	-	Sir Edward Henry	Senior civil servant before being appointed Inspector-General of Police of Bengal. Later served in other senior police appointments before becoming Commissioner
10	1918	1920	General	Sir Nevil Macready	
11	1920	1928	Brigadier-General	Sir William Horwood	
12	1928	1931	General	Julian Byng, 1st Viscount Byng of Vimy	
13	1931	1935	Marshal of the Royal Air Force	Hugh Trenchard, 1st Viscount Trenchard	See Hugh Trenchard as Metropolitan Police Commissioner for details.
14	1935	1945	Air Vice-Marshal	Sir Philip Game	
15	1945	1953	-	Sir Harold Scott	Previously a senior civil servant. First commissioner without any police or military background since Sir Richard Mayne
16	1953	1958	-	Sir John Nott-Bower	Nott-Bower had previously served in the Indian police, rising to the rank of superintendent.
17	1958	1968	-	Sir Joseph Simpson	Graduated from the Hendon Police College, as an acting station inspector after having joined as a constable. Chief constable of Surrey Constabulary 1946–1956
18	1968	1972	-	Sir John Waldron	Graduated from the Hendon Police College. Chief constable of Berkshire Constabulary 1954–1958
19	1972	1977	-	Sir Robert Mark	First commissioner to have risen through all the police ranks, as all subsequent commissioners have done. Chief constable of Leicester City Police 1957–1967
20	1977	1982	-	Sir David McNee	Chief constable of Glasgow City Police 1971–1975, and Strathclyde Police 1975–1977
21	1982	1987	-	Sir Kenneth Newman	Chief constable of Royal Ulster Constabulary 1976–1980
22	1987	1993	-	Sir Peter Imbert	Chief constable of Thames Valley Police 1979–1985
23	1993	2000	-	Sir Paul Condon	Chief constable of Kent Police 1989–1993
24	2000	2005	-	Sir John Stevens	Chief constable of Northumbria Police 1991–1996
25	2005	2008	-	Sir Ian Blair	Chief constable of Surrey Police 1998–2000
26	2009	2011	-	Sir Paul Stephenson	Acting 2008–2009. Chief constable of Lancashire Constabulary 2002–2005
27	2011	2017	-	Sir Bernard Hogan-Howe	Chief constable of Merseyside Police 2004–2009
28	2017	2022	-	Dame Cressida Dick	First woman and openly LGBT person to be appointed Commissioner. Assumed office 10 April 2017
29	2022	2022	-	Sir Stephen House	Acting
30	2022		-	Sir Mark Rowley	Chief constable of Surrey Police 2009–2011. Assumed office 12 September 2022

== See also ==
- Police ranks of the United Kingdom
