= Central Operations =

Central Operations (abbreviated CO) was a major directorate of the London Metropolitan Police Service that provides operational support to the rest of the service. It was commanded by Assistant Commissioner Mark Rowley, formerly Chief Constable of Surrey Police. In 2012 Central Operations (CO) merged with the Specialist Crime Directorate (SCD) to form Specialist Crime & Operations (SC&O)

== Units ==
There were many units within Central Operations.

Identifier	Description
CO1	Central Operations HQ
CO3	Emergency Preparedness Operational Command Unit
CO5	Firearms Command Unit
CO10	Central Communications Command
CO11	Public Order Operational Command Unit (formerly stood for Public Order Intelligence Unit)
CO12	2012 Olympics preparation (formerly stood for Public Order Training)
CO15	Traffic Operational Command Unit
CO16	Traffic Criminal Justice Unit
CO19	Specialist Firearms Command
CO20	Territorial Support Group

Operational Support:

- Air Support Unit
- Dog Support Unit
- Film Unit
- Marine Policing Unit
- Mounted Branch

== See also ==
- Territorial Operations, the predecessor to Central Operations
