= Killing of James Ashley =

1998 killing of unarmed man in UK

James Ashley
- Family photograph of Ashley
- Born: 1958
- Died: 15 January 1998 (aged 39); St Leonards-on-Sea, East Sussex, England
- Cause of death: Gunshot
- Other names: Jimmy Ashley

James Ashley (1958 – 15 January 1998) was a British man who, while unarmed and naked, was shot dead by police in his flat in St Leonards-on-Sea, East Sussex, on 15 January 1998. Armed officers raided the building on the suspicion that Ashley kept a firearm and a quantity of cocaine there, and to arrest him and another man in connection with a stabbing. Neither a firearm nor a significant quantity of drugs was found, the other man was not present, and it later emerged that Ashley was not implicated in the stabbing. Ashley, likely woken by the noise of the raid, was out of bed when an armed police officer entered his bedroom. On seeing the officer, Ashley raised one arm and the officer reacted by firing a single shot. Later that morning, Sussex Police chief constable Paul Whitehouse held a press conference in which he praised the conduct of the operation.

Two inquiries were held by other police forces under the auspices of the Police Complaints Authority (PCA), both of which strongly criticised the raid. The first found that the use of armed officers breached national guidelines, that the raid team had been inadequately trained, and that the officers in charge of it had received no training for their roles and had misrepresented intelligence to gain authorisation for the operation. The second inquiry accused Whitehouse, Deputy Chief Constable Mark Jordan, and Sussex's two assistant chief constables of colluding to obstruct the first. It suggested that Whitehouse knowingly gave false statements in his press conference, and recommended criminal charges against three of the four. The officer who shot Ashley was charged with murder in 2001 but acquitted on the grounds of self-defence. The officers who led the operation were charged with misconduct in public office and were also acquitted. No criminal charges were brought against the chief officers, but Jordan and Whitehouse both faced disciplinary proceedings. Jordan was suspended and allowed to retire in 2001. Whitehouse resigned in the same year under pressure from the Home Secretary, David Blunkett. His successor publicly apologised to Ashley's family in 2003.

Ashley's father and son sued the police for negligence and battery in Ashley v Chief Constable of Sussex Police. The police offered to settle all damages under the action for negligence and the other claims were struck out at the High Court, which the family appealed. The case reached the House of Lords (then the United Kingdom's highest court), where the appeal was successful. The lords confirmed that the threshold for a plea of self-defence in a civil case was higher than in a criminal one and that it was for the litigants, not the judge, to decide which causes of action to pursue, even where no further damages were available.

Ashley's death has been compared to other mistaken police shootings in the United Kingdom, including those of Stephen Waldorf, John Shorthouse, Harry Stanley, and Jean Charles de Menezes. It was one of the cases considered in a 2003 report by the PCA which recommended stronger control of armed operations and equipping armed officers with less-lethal alternatives such as tasers.

== Prelude ==
James "Jimmy" Ashley was a 39-year-old man from Liverpool living in St Leonards-on-Sea, East Sussex, on the south coast of England. Ashley and a group of friends occupied three of the six flats in a converted house in Western Road. He was suspected by Sussex Police of being involved in the distribution of heroin, and the police had heard rumours that he owned a gun. They placed the house under surveillance in October 1997, though the operation was wound up without producing any substantive evidence.

On 7 January 1998, Ashley was present when Thomas "Tosh" McCrudden, a friend he had been drinking with, stabbed and seriously wounded another man in an argument outside a pub in Hastings town centre. Ashley's only involvement was to pull McCrudden away from the victim. In the following week, armed officers were deployed to pursue several leads but failed to apprehend McCrudden. Officers believed McCrudden was staying in the Western Road house and formulated a plan to raid it. Detectives obtained a search warrant based on a tip-off from an officer in the regional crime squad that a large quantity of cocaine had been delivered to the house, and the plan to use armed officers was authorised by the deputy chief constable, Mark Jordan, based on the rumour that Ashley had a firearm. The officers conducting the raid were briefed that McCrudden was dangerous and known to be in the flats and about the potential firearm. They were also told, incorrectly, that Ashley was wanted for shooting a man in Eastbourne and had a previous conviction for attempted murder. (Note: Ashley had a previous conviction for manslaughter, for which he had served two years in prison, but was not connected to the Eastbourne shooting and did not have a conviction for attempted murder.) At the time, it was the largest firearms operation in Sussex Police's history, using 25 armed officers.

== Shooting ==
On 15 January, at approximately 04:30, officers from Sussex Police executed a search warrant on the Western Road house. The operation had three stated objectives—the apprehension of McCrudden, the retrieval of the cocaine, and the seizure of the firearm. It used a technique known as "Bermuda", which was originally designed for hostage-rescue operations but had become standard in Sussex Police for rapid entry operations to secure evidence. The technique was known to be high-risk as it involved lone officers rapidly entering an assigned room before calling in backup if a threat was found, and had previously been criticised in the media, while other police forces had discontinued its use. Only four of the six occupants of the flats were the target of the raid, but the police did not have details of which occupants lived in which of the flats. The police also lacked plans for the building, which hampered the raid when they encountered a locked internal door. Once opened, the door blocked the entrance to Ashley's flat, further delaying the officers.

Ashley had been naked in bed when his girlfriend woke him to investigate a noise, likely caused by police forcing doors in the building. As he moved towards the door of his darkened bedroom, he suddenly encountered one of the officers. Ashley raised his arm, to which the officer reacted by firing a single shot at a range of about two feet (60 cm). Ashley was hit in the armpit and the bullet travelled to his heart, killing him almost immediately. At the conclusion of the raid, no firearms or significant quantity of drugs (only a small quantity of cannabis) was found. Three men in two other flats were arrested but McCrudden was not among them and none were wanted by the police; all three were later released without charge. (Note: McCrudden was arrested elsewhere days later and eventually sentenced to five and a half years' imprisonment for the pub stabbing.) On the day of the raid, Sussex Police's chief constable, Paul Whitehouse, held a press conference at which he announced that Ashley had been wanted for attempted murder. He praised the conduct of the operation, and claimed that the deployment of armed officers had been justified and necessary.

== Inquiries ==
An inquiry was launched by neighbouring Kent Police under the supervision of the Police Complaints Authority (PCA), and led by Barbara Wilding, an assistant chief constable. Two police constables (including PC Christopher Sherwood, the officer who shot Ashley) were suspended, (Note: As a matter of course, police shootings in Britain are subject to an independent investigation and the officers involved are removed from operational duties.) along with three more senior officers—a superintendent and two inspectors. Two superintendents from other police forces, experts on police firearms policy, gave evidence to the Kent Police inquiry that the operation did not follow national guidelines for police use of firearms, and that the use of armed officers was not necessary to apprehend McCrudden as there was no evidence that he had access to firearms; further, if a firearm was believed to be in the flat, the preferable tactic would have been to arrest the suspects on the street rather than send police officers into the building. The investigation further found that the use of armed officers in earlier attempts to arrest McCrudden also breached national guidelines, in that senior officers improperly granted authority for the use of firearms, and that on several occasions armed officers self-deployed without authorisation at all.

The inquiry revealed that neither the police officer in charge of the manhunt for McCrudden (the incident commander) nor the intelligence commander on the operation were adequately trained for their roles and that they had been warned against the use of the "Bermuda" tactic by national experts because it presented too high a risk for the stated objectives, and that the police had failed to prepare for the operation by obtaining plans for the building and details of other occupants. It also emerged that the officers deployed on the raid had never trained as a group in the use of the tactic, and that Sherwood had never been trained in it individually. The Kent inquiry concluded that the basis for the raid was "not merely exaggerated, it was determinably false" and that the officers involved in its planning had "concocted" the evidence or planned to misrepresent it to justify the operation.

The PCA commissioned a second inquiry, convened in August 1998 and chaired by Sir John Hoddinott, chief constable of Hampshire Constabulary, to investigate the conduct of Sussex's chief officers, after Wilding's report accused them of obstructing her investigation. Hoddinott interviewed Whitehouse, Jordan, and Sussex's two assistant chief constables, Nigel Yeo and Maria Wallis, over allegations that they had misled the original inquiry by claiming that they could not recall key details and that they had misrepresented the intelligence that led to the raid. The Hoddinott inquiry suggested that the incident commander and intelligence commander both knew that neither McCrudden nor the cocaine were in the building, or that they at least exaggerated the strength of the intelligence, to bolster their case for authorisation to the deputy chief constable. In particular, the tip off from the regional crime squad was in fact in relation to a potential drugs shipment to an unrelated address, the belief that McCrudden was inside was exaggerated from a report of an unidentified man entering the building, and the report of a firearm was based on nothing more than rumour.

Hoddinott sharply criticised Whitehouse and the press conference he held on the day of the raid, in which, according to the report, Whitehouse "wilfully failed to tell the truth as he knew it; he did so without reasonable excuse or justification and what he published and said was misleading and therefore likely to injure the public interest". His report suggested there was "evidence of collusion between some or all of the chief officers" of Sussex Police to conceal what they already knew at the time of the press conference (that Ashley was unarmed, that no significant quantity of drugs had been found, and that McCrudden was not present), and that "an arguable case of attempting to pervert the course of justice might be made out", though he concluded that a charge of misconduct in public office was more credible. Hoddinott also accused Jordan of malfeasance, discreditable conduct, and supporting Whitehouse's false statements, and Yeo, one of the assistant chief constables, of malfeasance.

== Prosecutions and disciplinary proceedings ==
Sherwood was charged with murder and tried at the Old Bailey in London in 2001, but was acquitted after the trial judge, Mrs Justice Anne Rafferty, directed the jury to find him not guilty. Sherwood claimed self-defence, telling the court that he feared for his life, believing—based on the briefing for the operation—that Ashley's outstretched arm was holding a firearm and was about to shoot. In directing the jury, the judge stated that no evidence had been presented that Sherwood fired other than in self-defence, and in her summing up suggested that "those who should be held accountable were not present" in her court. The superintendent and two inspectors suspended after the first inquiry were then prosecuted for misconduct in public office in relation to their planning and execution of the raid. The prosecution alleged that the three had deliberately failed to give an accurate representation of the intelligence but all three were found not guilty at Wolverhampton Crown Court when the Crown Prosecution Service declined to offer any evidence. Nigel Sweeney, prosecuting, told the court that the depth of "corporate failing" within Sussex Police made it impossible to place criminal liability with individual officers. Following the verdict Ashley's family announced their intention to sue Sussex Police for negligence.

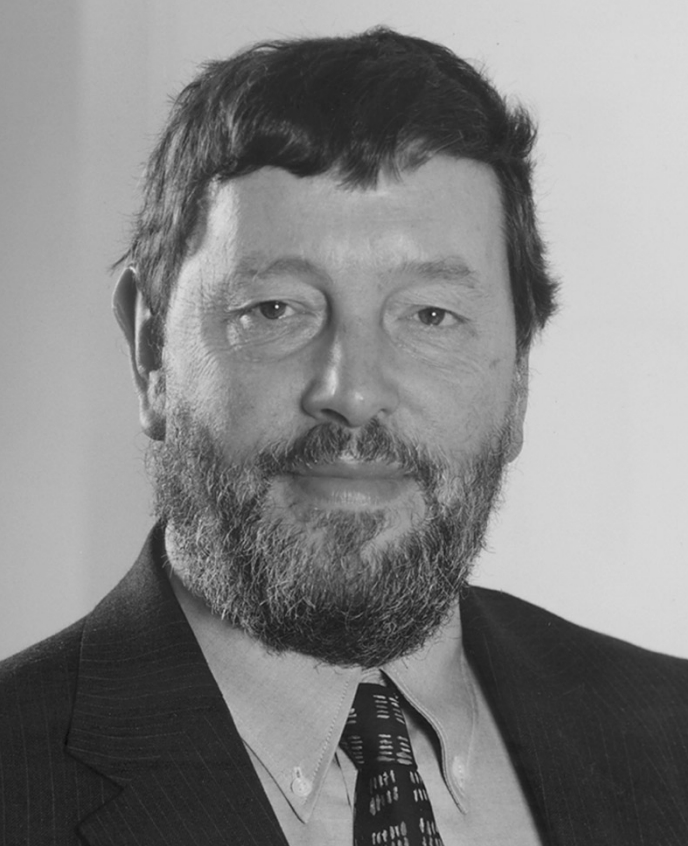
David Blunkett (pictured in 2001 or 2002), who intervened in the case while Home Secretary in 2001

Hoddinott's report was forwarded to the Crown Prosecution Service (CPS) for consideration of charges against the chief officers of Sussex Police for misconduct in public office, but the CPS dropped the case on the grounds of insufficient evidence. Whitehouse was suspended for three weeks while the Sussex police authority considered Hoddinott's report but was reinstated with written advice, in which the authority told him it was "not satisfied that you have not committed a disciplinary offence", and instructed him that "your role as a strong and supportive commander of your force should never be confused with your duty never to mislead or misinform". He resigned in 2001 after the Home Secretary, David Blunkett, wrote to the police authority, instructing them to consider dismissing Whitehouse. Jordan was also suspended after the report and faced internal disciplinary proceedings following the CPS's decision not to pursue criminal charges, but was allowed to retire on medical grounds in 2001. The three middle-ranking officers acquitted of misconduct in public office remained suspended pending internal disciplinary proceedings, which were dropped in 2003. The officers, along with two others involved in Ashley's death, sued the force the following year, claiming it had been negligent in failing to train them properly and that they had suffered psychiatric injury as a result of the shooting and subsequent criminal and disciplinary proceedings. Their case was thrown out at the High Court and an appeal in 2006 was dismissed on the grounds that the damages suffered were too remote from the alleged negligence to be reasonably foreseeable.

The local coroner opened an inquest in the immediate aftermath of Ashley's death but it was adjourned pending the outcome of the police investigations and criminal proceedings. In 2001, the coroner informed the interested parties that the inquest would not be resumed. As a result, the family began campaigning for a public inquiry into the circumstances of Ashley's death and the subsequent investigations. The government considered the request but no such inquiry was held.

Whitehouse's successor as chief constable, Ken Jones, almost immediately introduced changes to the force's policies on conducting armed operations. He also issued an apology on behalf of the force in 2003, travelling to Liverpool to make the apology to Ashley's mother in person. He said "James should not have died but, and this will be of small comfort to his loved ones and friends, his death has resulted in safer firearms procedures for us all". Ashley's family welcomed the apology but, with the backing of their local MP, Louise Ellman, continued to campaign for a public inquiry.

== Civil case ==
Ashley v Chief Constable of Sussex Police
- Court: House of Lords
- Decided: 23 April 2008
- Citation: [2008] UKHL 25
- Transcript: HoL website

Case history
- Appealed from: Court of Appeal ([2006] EWCA Civ 1085)

Court membership
- Judges sitting: Lord Bingham of Cornhill; Lord Scott of Foscote; Lord Rodger of Earlsferry; Lord Carswell; Lord Neuberger of Abbotsbury

Ashley's son and father sued Sussex Police for the torts of negligence (in respect of the planning of the operation and the shooting itself), battery, false imprisonment, and misfeasance in public office. The case was first heard by Mrs Justice Linda Dobbs in the High Court in 2004 as Ashley v Chief Constable of Sussex Police. (Note: The case was brought against the office of the chief constable in his professional capacity for his vicarious liability for the actions of his officers. He would not have been personally liable for any damages awarded.) The police admitted false imprisonment and to negligence in relation to the planning of the raid but denied liability for all other counts (including negligence regarding the shooting itself). They offered to pay the full amount of damages sought by the Ashleys under those causes of action. Mrs Justice Dobbs ruled, on summary judgment, that the police's offer meant that continuing with the other claims would be an abuse of process, and that the action for battery had no realistic prospect of success as the burden of proof was on the claimants, who could not negate Sherwood's self-defence claim from the criminal trial.

The Ashleys appealed the striking out of their claim for battery to the Court of Appeal, where the case was heard in 2006. The Court of Appeal held that the judge had erred in her decision that the battery claim had no realistic prospect of success and in her decision that the burden of proof rested with the claimant to disprove a defence of self-defence in a civil case. The court allowed the family's appeal, holding that—in a civil action for battery—the burden was on the respondent (the police) to prove their claim of self-defence, and that the claim had to be based on both an "honest" and a "reasonable" belief of being in imminent danger, a higher standard than in criminal law. The court (by a majority) also held that continuing the claim for battery would not be an abuse of process, even though the police had offered to pay all the compensation sought by the family under the claims for negligence and false imprisonment (meaning that they would receive no further damages if their claim for battery succeeded). (Note: The Court of Appeal also held that the High Court had been incorrect in striking out the claim of misfeasance in public office in relation to the chief constable's conduct in the aftermath of the shooting, but this point was not appealed.)

The police appealed the decision to the House of Lords, then the United Kingdom's court of last resort. The court considered two main issues, both in relation to the battery claim. The first was the standard for a self-defence claim in a civil case and whether, in a case of a mistaken belief that the defendant was under attack, that belief must be both honest and reasonable, and the second was whether it would be an abuse of process to allow the battery claim to proceed given the police's offer to pay all the damages sought. On the first, the lords unanimously upheld the Court of Appeal's finding that both criteria must be met for a defence of self-defence to succeed in a tort action. Lord Scott noted that "it is fundamental to criminal law ... that, as a general rule, no-one should be punished for a crime he or she did not intend to commit or be punished for the consequences of an honest mistake" but that "the function of the civil law is ... to identify and protect the rights that every person is entitled to assert against, and require to be respected by, others" and that the law "must strike a balance between these conflicting rights". He concluded that "it is one thing to say that if A's mistaken belief was honestly held he should not be punished by the criminal law. It would be quite another to say that A's unreasonably held mistaken belief would be sufficient to justify the law in setting aside B's right not to be subjected to physical violence".

The lords were split on the second point, the minority (Lord Carswell and Lord Neuberger of Abbotsbury) believing allowing the claim for battery to proceed would be an abuse of process given that no further damages were available. Lord Carswell, quoting Lord Justice Auld from the Court of Appeal, opined that "the civil courts exist to award compensation, not conduct public inquiries". The majority (three to two) held that the battery claim was not an abuse of process and that it was for the litigants, not the judiciary, to decide which actions to pursue, noting that the success of the claim would not expose Sherwood to double jeopardy, and noting again the different purposes of tort and criminal law.

The police and the Ashley family agreed damages in 2009. In a statement, Ashley's son said "The police killed my dad illegally. They have now admitted it and apologised, and at last I know everything that happened". While maintaining that the shooting itself was not unlawful, the police issued a statement describing Ashley's death as "a tragedy which should never have occurred" and conceded that it "was caused by a series of failures at levels of Sussex Police in relation to events prior to the raid and its planning and execution ... Sussex Police also acknowledges that there were serious shortcomings in the way in which the aftermath of Mr Ashley's death was handled".

== Impact ==
Although the case merely confirmed existing law, rather than changing it or creating new law, it was still deemed significant for its confirmation that the standard for a claim of self-defence was higher in a civil case than a criminal one, and for Lord Scott's analysis of the differing purposes of criminal and civil law and the confirmation that a "not guilty" verdict in a criminal court did not preclude civil liability.

According to Nick Davies, in an investigation for The Guardian newspaper in 2001, Ashley's death was one of 41 incidents in the preceding decade in which police in England and Wales shot a person who turned out not to have a firearm. Of those shootings, at least 15 proved fatal. In 28 of the 41 cases, the person shot had a replica firearm or some other kind of weapon, and another six were accidental discharges, leaving seven (including Ashley) which Davies described as "disturbing". Davies concluded that "this might look like a ... a licence for police officers to kill. In reality, it indicates something very different but equally disturbing...: police use of firearms is inherently dangerous. The more police are armed, the more they will shoot the wrong people. And the law which surrounds this is inadequate and incapable of fixing the blame when things go wrong".

Davies described Ashley's shooting as "merely the final shot in a volley of error unleashed by just about every rank in Sussex police". Ashley's death has been compared by the media and academics to several other mistaken shootings by police officers in Britain, in particular the 1983 shooting of Stephen Waldorf, the 1985 death of John Shorthouse, the 1999 death of Harry Stanley, and the 2005 death of Jean Charles de Menezes. Waldorf was a film editor shot and seriously injured by police officers in London after he was mistaken for an escaped criminal; he later sued the police and was awarded substantial damages. John Shorthouse was a five-year-old boy who was shot dead during an armed police raid on his parents' home in Birmingham. Stanley was shot dead by a police armed response team who mistook a table leg he was carrying for a firearm; after two inquests, a criminal investigation, and an independent inquiry it was eventually decided that the officers involved would not face criminal or disciplinary proceedings. Menezes was a Brazilian electrician who was wrongly identified as a fugitive terrorist involved in a failed suicide bombing the day before and was shot by counter-terrorism officers when he boarded a London Underground train. A 2005 article in The Independent, following the dropping of charges against the officers who shot Stanley, also drew comparisons with Ashley's case and listed it among 30 fatal police shootings in the preceding 12 years, none of which resulted in a successful prosecution of a police officer.

Maurice Punch, an academic specialising in policing issues, described the ramifications of the Ashley case as "profound" in that an individual police officer was charged with murder for actions taken "in the course of his duty and under the command of superiors" and for Mrs Justice Rafferty's comments regarding upward accountability, a theme Punch compared to the shooting of three Provisional IRA members by the Special Air Service in Gibraltar in 1988 (Operation Flavius).

Among Jones's first actions as the new chief constable was to strengthen Sussex Police's procedures for the deployment of armed officers. In January 2003, a PCA report considered 24 police shootings from 1998 to 2001, including Ashley's. Among its recommendations were that armed police officers also be equipped with non-lethal options, such as tasers, to reduce the chances of further shootings, a recommendation that was endorsed by Ashley's mother. The report also recommended stronger command and control of firearms operations.

== See also ==
- Police use of firearms in the United Kingdom
- List of killings by law enforcement officers in the United Kingdom
