= Anti-terrorist policies of the Metropolitan police =

Tactics of the Metropolitan Police

There are six known secret anti terrorist policies of the Metropolitan Police. They are Operations Clydesdale, Rainbow, Kratos, Trammel, Camion and Lightning. None of them have had the operational details formally disclosed, and as a result, little information is known on these.

== Operations ==
=== Operation Clydesdale ===
Operation Clydesdale has had no publicity within the Metropolitan Police Service (MPS), and must therefore be considered as classified as the better-known Operation Kratos. This deals with a prospective raid against a suicide bomber, and also authorizes officers to shoot-to-kill if they think it is necessary to reduce the threat to themselves and the general public.

=== Operation Rainbow ===
Operation Rainbow was started on 23 May 1995, as a response to the 1993 Bishopsgate bomb that wreaked havoc throughout the city of London. Operation Rainbow is the only currently running overt Anti Terrorist policy of the MPS, and is the longest-running police operation ever. The operation co-ordinates responses to, and provides information about the threat of Terrorism to the city. It has been described as a ‘London success’ that has contributed enormously to the protection of Londoners from terrorist attacks. The main focus that Operation Rainbow is based upon is the viewing of CCTV. The unit constantly maintains a database of recording CCTV areas throughout London, which is available to all officers for use not only in the prevention of terrorism but other investigations, such as anti-social behavior and robberies.

Operation Rainbow is by far the most mentioned policy but the details are still sketchy as contradicting sources confuse the matter. According to some, "This is a team of officers who are constantly updating our contingency plans in relation to vulnerable sites in the Borough". The Rainbow title is also that of a unit, and indeed is known, in another quote, "Staff in the operation Rainbow unit conducted briefings, talks and seminars delivering their message to 1,655 officers and support staff". So, it can be correctly assumed that the Rainbow name applies to the unit and the operation controlled by the unit. "Operation Rainbow continues to organize and develop the overt aspects of the MPS counter-terrorism strategy. This includes routine patrolling, informed awareness…"

=== Operation Lightning ===
Operation Lightning is a national intelligence gathering operation run by SO15 (Counter-terrorism Command) designed to record and analyze suspicious sightings or activity at or near to any prominent buildings or structures. This would include the public transport system throughout the United Kingdom and would include the cooperation of the British Transport Police, in relation to the transport network. It would also probably include the cooperation of SO18 (aviation and airport policing) and SCD10 – Surveillance (covert policing).

=== Operation Trammel ===
Operation Trammel is an operation run by SO13 designed to identify criminals linked with terrorist organizations by the use of 'key indicators'. This would include credit card related fraud and forged documents used to fund terrorism. This policy would not have such a high-profile role, as the results would not be as evident to the press, it would merely be treated as another 'terrorism-related arrest'

=== Operation Camion ===
Operation Camion is designed to identify and deal with individuals who support international terrorist groups linked to the Al-Qaeda network, who are engaged in the theft of vehicles containing hazardous material (material with nuclear, biological or chemical dangers or high explosive capabilities) and theft of marked emergency services vehicles or identifiable military vehicles that would not normally attract suspicion. There have been expressions of incredulity by the public that fully operating emergency vehicles (specifically NHS West Midlands Ambulances and Surrey Police cars) have been found for sale on Internet auction sites such as eBay. The Mirror published an article on this policy on 10 July titled "TERROR ALERT @ EBAY Surplus emergency vehicles could be used as car bombs".

=== Operation Kratos ===
See Operation Kratos for details.

== See also ==
- 7 July 2005 London bombings
- 21 July 2005 London bombings
- Death of Jean Charles de Menezes
- Specialist Firearms Command
- Counter Terrorism Command
