= James Ashley =

James Ashley may refer to:

- James Ashley (politician) (1940–2006), Lord Mayor of Manchester, England
- James Mitchell Ashley (1824–1896), member of the U.S. House of Representatives
- James Ashley (1958–1998), Englishman shot dead by Sussex Police - see Shooting of James Ashley
