= Gonzaga =

Gonzaga may refer to:

== Places ==
- Gonzaga, Lombardy, commune in the province of Mantua, Italy
- Gonzaga, Cagayan, municipality in the Philippines
- Gonzaga, Minas Gerais, town in Brazil
- Forte Gonzaga, fort in Messina, Sicily

== Surname ==
- House of Gonzaga, family that ruled Mantua from 1328 to 1708
- Alex Gonzaga (born 1988), Filipina actress
- Aloysius Gonzaga (1568–1591), Italian aristocrat and member of the Society of Jesus
- Antonio Gonzaga (c. 1875), Argentine chef and cookbook writer
- Chiquinha Gonzaga (1847–1935), Brazilian composer
- Dorothy Gonzaga (born 1973), Filipino lawyer and politician
- Ercole Gonzaga (1505–1563), Italian cardinal
- Federico II Gonzaga, Duke of Mantua (1500–1540), Italian nobleman
- Ferrante Gonzaga (1507-1557), commander-in-chief of the Italian army
- Gabriel Gonzaga (born 1979), Brazilian mixed martial arts fighter
- Giulia Gonzaga (1513–1566), Italian noblewoman
- Ginger Gonzaga (born 1983), American comedian and actress
- Luis Gonzaga (born 1979), Puerto Rican actor
- Luiz Gonzaga (1912–1989), Brazilian musician
- Ruwel Peter Gonzaga (born 1970), Filipino lawyer and politician
- Pirro Gonzaga (cardinal) (1505–1529) Roman Catholic cardinal and Bishop of Modena
- Tomás António Gonzaga (1744–c. 1810), Portuguese-Brazilian poet
- Toni Gonzaga (born 1984), Filipina actress
- Vincenzo Gonzaga, Duke of Mantua (1562–1612), Italian nobleman
- Wélissa Gonzaga (born 1982), Brazilian volleyball player

== Given name ==
- Gonzaga Gonza, one of the Uganda Martyrs
- Mary Gonzaga Barry, Irish–Australian religious sister and educator

== Institutes ==
=== High schools ===
- Gonzaga College in Dublin, Ireland
- Gonzaga College High School in Washington, D.C., United States
- Gonzaga High School in St. John's, Canada
- Gonzaga Preparatory School in Spokane, United States
- Kolese Gonzaga in Jakarta, Indonesia
- St. Aloysius Gonzaga Secondary School in Mississauga, Canada

=== Universities ===
- Gonzaga University, in Spokane, United States
  - Gonzaga Bulldogs, athletic program of Gonzaga University
