= Killing of Jean Charles de Menezes =

2005 wrongful police shooting in London, England

Jean Charles de Menezes
- Menezes in January 2001
- Born: Jean Charles da Silva de Menezes; 7 January 1978; Gonzaga, Minas Gerais, Brazil
- Died: 22 July 2005 (aged 27); Stockwell, London, England
- Cause of death: Gunshots to the head/body
- Parent(s): Matosinhos Otoni de Menezes (father); Maria Otone da Silva (mother)

Jean Charles da Silva de Menezes (Brazilian Portuguese: [ʒeˈɐ̃ ˈʃaʁliz dʒi meˈnezis]; 7 January 1978 – 22 July 2005) was a Brazilian man fatally shot and wrongfully killed by the Metropolitan Police Service at Stockwell Station of the London Underground, after being mistakenly identified as one of the fugitives from the previous day's failed bombing attempts. These attempts occurred two weeks after the first 7 July 2005 London bombings, in which 52 people were killed.

The Independent Police Complaints Commission (IPCC) launched two investigations: Known as Stockwell 1 and Stockwell 2, the findings of Stockwell 1—initially withheld from the public—concluded that none of the officers would face disciplinary charges, while Stockwell 2 strongly criticized the police command structure and its communication with the public.

In July 2006, the Crown Prosecution Service determined that there was insufficient evidence to prosecute any individual police officer, although a criminal prosecution for failing in duty of care towards Menezes was officially initiated against the Commissioner Sir Ian Blair under the Health and Safety at Work etc. Act 1974.

Commissioner Blair was found guilty, and his office was fined. On 12 December 2008, an inquest returned an open verdict.

The death of Menezes led to protests in Brazil and prompted apologies from British Prime Minister Tony Blair and Foreign Secretary Jack Straw. The Landless Workers' Movement demonstrated outside British diplomatic missions in Brasília and Rio de Janeiro. The shooting also led to debate over shoot-to-kill policies adopted by the Metropolitan Police Service after the September 11 attacks.

== Biography ==
Jean Charles de Menezes was born in Gonzaga, Minas Gerais, Brazil, where he grew up on a family farm. His father worked as a bricklayer. Demonstrating an early aptitude for electronics, Menezes left the farm at the age of 14 to live with his uncle in São Paulo and pursue further education. At age 19, he obtained a professional diploma from Escola Estadual São Sebastião (São Sebastião State School).

On 13 March 2002, Menezes travelled to Britain on a six-month visitor visa. Following the visa's expiration, he applied for a student visa, which allowed him to remain in the country until 30 June 2003.

== Shooting ==
Almost all of the facts regarding the Menezes shooting were initially disputed by various parties. Contradictory witness accounts, "off the record" statements from the police, and media speculation all added confusion to the case. An ITV report on 16 August 2005 claimed to contain leaked documents from an IPCC investigation.

=== Hunt for suspects ===
On 22 July 2005, the Metropolitan Police were searching for four suspects in four attempted bombings carried out the previous day; three at London Underground stations and one on a bus in Haggerston. As the perpetrators had not died in the failed suicide bombings, a large police investigation and manhunt began immediately. An address on Scotia Road, Tulse Hill, in south London was written on a gym membership card that was found inside one of the undetonated bags used by the bombers.

Menezes, an electrician, lived in one of the flats with two of his cousins, and had just received a call to fix a broken fire alarm in Kilburn. At around 9:30 am, officers carrying out surveillance saw Menezes emerge from the communal entrance of the block.

An officer on duty in a surveillance van at Scotia Road, referred to as "Frank" in the Stockwell 1 report, compared Menezes' likeness to that of the CCTV photographs of the bombing suspects from the previous day and noticed similarities that he felt warranted attention. As the officer was allegedly urinating into a bottle at the time, he was unable to immediately film the suspect to transmit images to Gold Command, the Metropolitan Police operational headquarters for major incidents. The inquest transcript confirms that "Frank" was a soldier on secondment to the undercover surveillance unit.

=== Misidentification ===
Based on Frank's suspicion, the Operation's Gold Commander, Cressida Dick, then authorized officers to continue pursuit and surveillance, and ordered that the suspect be prevented from entering the London Underground system.

Documents from the independent agency investigation of the shooting later concluded that mistakes in police surveillance procedure led to a failure to properly identify Menezes early on, leading to rushed assumptions and actions later at Stockwell tube station.

=== Pursuit ===
The officers followed Menezes to a bus stop for the number 2 bus on Tulse Hill, where several plainclothes officers boarded. Menezes briefly got off the bus at Brixton station. Seeing a notice that the station was closed due to a security alert because of the previous day's attempted bombings, he made a telephone call and reboarded the bus towards Stockwell.

Unaware the station was closed, the surveillance officers said they believed that Menezes' behaviour suggested that he might have been one of the previous day's failed bomb suspects. Officers claimed that Menezes' behaviour appeared "suspicious". They later stated they were satisfied they had the correct man, noting that he "had Mongolian eyes". During this journey towards Stockwell station, 3.3 kilometres (2.1 mi) away, the pursuing officers contacted Gold Command, reporting that Menezes potentially matched the description of two of the previous day's suspects, including Osman Hussain. Based on this information, Gold Command authorized Operation Kratos tactics and ordered the surveillance officers to prevent Menezes from boarding a train. According to a "senior police source at Scotland Yard", Police Commander Cressida Dick told the surveillance team that the man was to be "detained as soon as possible", before entering the station. Gold Command then transferred control of the operation to Specialist Firearms Command (known as "CO19" or "SO19"), which dispatched firearms officers to Stockwell tube station.

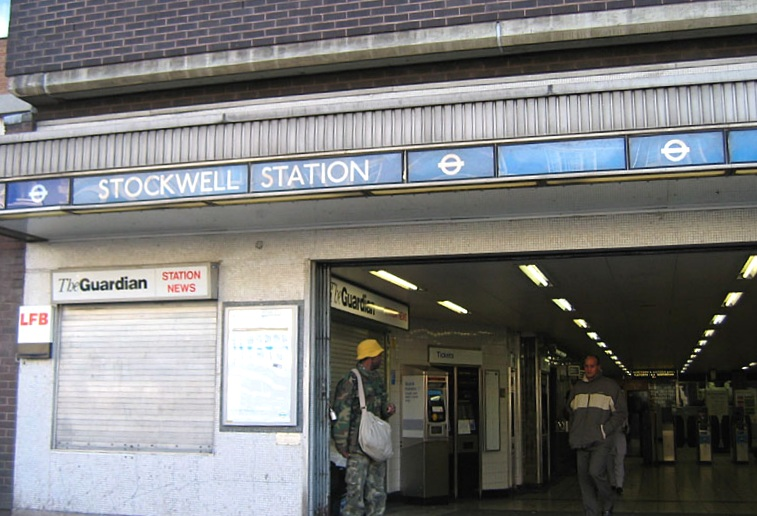
Stockwell tube station entrance

Menezes entered the Stockwell tube station at about 10:00 am, stopping to pick up a free newspaper. He used his Oyster card to pay the fare, walked through the barriers, and descended the escalator. He then ran across the platform to board the newly arrived train. Menezes boarded the train and took one of the first available seats.

Three surveillance officers, codenamed Hotel 1, Hotel 3, and Hotel 9, followed Menezes onto the train. Hotel 3 sat on the left, with two or three passengers between Menezes and himself. According to Hotel 3, Menezes sat down about two seats away, with a glass panel on his right. When the firearms officers arrived on the platform, Hotel 3 moved to the door, blocked it from closing with his left foot, and shouted, "He's here!" to identify the suspect's location.

=== Shooting ===
The firearms officers boarded the train, and it was initially claimed that they challenged the suspect, though later reports indicate that he was not challenged. According to Hotel 3, Menezes then stood up and moved towards the officers and Hotel 3, at which point Hotel 3 grabbed him, pinned his arms against his torso, and pushed him back into the seat. Although Menezes was being restrained, his body was straight and not in a natural sitting position. Hotel 3 heard a shot close to his ear and was dragged away onto the floor of the carriage. He shouted "Police!" and, with hands raised, was dragged out of the carriage by one of the armed officers who had boarded the train. Hotel 3 then heard several gunshots while being dragged out.

Two officers fired a total of eleven shots, according to the number of empty cartridge casings found on the floor of the train afterwards. Menezes was shot seven times in the head and once in the shoulder at close range and died at the scene. An eyewitness later said that the eleven shots were fired over a period of thirty seconds, at three-second intervals. A separate witness reported hearing five shots, followed at an interval by several more shots.

Immediately after the shooting, the Metropolitan Police stated that the shooting was "directly linked" to the investigation of the attempted bombings the previous day. It was revealed that police policy towards suspected suicide bombers had been revised and that officers had been ordered to fire directly at suspects' heads, the theory being that shooting at the chest could detonate a concealed bomb.

The SO19 firearms officers involved in the shooting were debriefed, and drug and alcohol tests were taken as per standard procedure. The officers were taken off duty pending an investigation into the shooting. One security agency source said later that members of SO19 received training from the SAS. He said the operation was not typical of the police and bore the hallmarks of a special forces operation.

It emerged that hollow-point bullets had been employed, and a senior police source said that Menezes' body had been "unrecognisable". These bullets are widely used in law enforcement, where it may often be necessary to quickly stop an armed assailant while minimising the risk of collateral damage posed by the use of full metal jacket ammunition. A full metal jacket bullet is more likely to exit the target while still retaining lethal force. A Home Office spokesman said, "Chief officers can use whatever ammunition they consider appropriate for the operational circumstances."

=== Immediate aftermath ===
The day after the shooting, the Metropolitan Police identified the victim as Jean Charles de Menezes and said that he had not been carrying explosives, nor was he connected in any way to the attempted bombings. They issued an apology describing the incident as "a tragedy, and one that the Metropolitan Police Service regrets".

The Menezes family condemned the shooting and rejected the apology. His grandmother said there was "no reason to think he was a terrorist". Although it was initially reported that they were offered almost £585,000 in compensation, the Menezes family eventually received £100,000 in compensation from the Metropolitan Police.

His cousin, Alex Alves Pereira, said, "I believe my cousin's death was the result of police incompetence." Pereira said that police claims regarding the incident had been conflicting and took issue with their pursuit of Menezes for an extended period and their allowing the "suspected suicide bomber" to board a bus. "Why did they let him get on a bus if they are afraid of suicide bombers?... He could have been running, but not from the police... When the Underground stops, everybody runs to get on the train. That he jumped over the barriers is a lie."

The Brazilian government released a statement expressing its shock at the killing, saying that it looked forward "to receiving the necessary explanation from the British authorities on the circumstances which led to this tragedy." Foreign Minister Celso Amorim, who had already arranged to visit London, said he would seek a meeting with the UK's Foreign Secretary, Jack Straw. He later met ministers and had a telephone conversation with Straw.

The Muslim Council of Britain expressed immediate concern about the apparent existence of a "shoot-to-kill" policy and called on police to make clear their reasons for shooting the man dead.

On 27 July 2005, Menezes' body was flown to Brazil for burial. His funeral took place in Gonzaga on 29 July 2005, exactly one week after the shooting. A public requiem mass for Menezes, attended by Cardinal Cormac Murphy-O'Connor, was held at Westminster Cathedral around the same time.

== Public reaction ==
=== In Britain ===
A vigil at Stockwell station was held with some of the relatives on the Sunday immediately following the shooting and police apology. Another, called by the Stop the War Coalition, was held on 25 July. It was reported that around a thousand people attended and then several hundred people, led by a group of Brazilians (some of whom had been friends with Jean Charles), began an impromptu demonstration.

On 23 August 2005, Dania Gorodi, a Romanian immigrant, the sister of victim Michelle Otto who was killed in the 7 July 2005 London bombings, asked for an end to the criticism of Sir Ian Blair over the Menezes shooting, which she felt had moved the media focus away from the bombings. "People have lost sight of the bigger picture", she said. "We need to support the police right now, not crucify one man. This is unprecedented in British history. He [Sir Ian] is doing the best he can."

When, on 12 September 2006, the Metropolitan Police Authority promoted Commander Cressida Dick to the role of Deputy Assistant Commissioner, the family said they were 'absolutely disgusted'. The family also criticized the awarding of the Queen's Police Medal to Commander Dick in the 2010 New Year's Day honours.

On 29 September 2008, performance artist Mark McGowan "re-enacted" the killing at Stockwell station, to protest against the then-current lack of response. He was quoted as saying "People are distracted by things like The X Factor and Christmas, so I'm doing this as a reaction."

==== Police comments ====
Senior Scotland Yard officer Deputy Assistant Commissioner Alan Given, who had operational responsibilities for the officers who had killed Menezes, said that "when it came to the Stockwell shooting, there was a sense that it was no different from an incident such as police shooting a bank robber".

On the day of Menezes' death, at his mid-afternoon press conference, Sir Ian Blair, stated: "I need to make clear that any death is deeply regrettable".

=== In Brazil ===
The reaction of the Brazilian public was overwhelmingly negative. Protests and demonstrations were held in Brazil. His cousin called Menezes' death a "third-world error". Brazilian newspaper O Globo criticized Home Secretary Charles Clarke for his praise for the Metropolitan Police Service after the shooting, while Jornal do Brasil wrote that "Instead of apologising, the English authorities came out in defence of those responsible for this disastrous [police] action."

== Independent Police Complaints Commission inquiry ==
Several days after the shooting, it was announced that the incident would be subject to an internal investigation by officers from Scotland Yard's Directorate of Professional Standards and would be referred to the Independent Police Complaints Commission (IPCC), as is the case with all fatal police shootings.

Immediately after the shooting, Commissioner Sir Ian Blair telephoned the Chairman of the IPCC and wrote a letter to the Home Office, describing his instruction that "the shooting that has just occurred at Stockwell is not to be referred to the IPCC and that they will be given no access to the scene at the present time." The letter, later released by the Met under the Freedom of Information Act, expressed the Commissioner's intent to protect the tactics and sources of information used in a counter-terrorism operation from the public jeopardising future operations.

=== Controversy between the Met and the IPCC ===
On 18 August, lawyers representing the Menezes family met the IPCC and urged them to conduct a "fast" investigation. The lawyers, Harriet Wistrich and Gareth Peirce, held a press conference where they lamented the "chaotic mess". They stated their desire to ask the IPCC "to find out... how much is incompetence, negligence, or gross negligence and how much of it is something sinister".

On 18 August, the IPCC issued a statement in which it said that the Metropolitan Police was initially opposed to them taking on the investigation. It also announced that the inquiry was expected to last between three and six months. The IPCC announced it took over the inquiry on 25 July; however, the inquiry was not handed over until 27 July.

The police lobbied MPs to try to influence the inquiry into the shooting. Unsolicited emails were sent by Nick Williams, the acting inspector at the Metropolitan Police's Diamond Support Group, to Labour MPs denying that there was a "shoot-to-kill" policy and that the tactics employed were necessary. The Met declined repeated requests by the IPCC to disclose hundreds of pages of internal papers that gave the Met's private assessment of the operation, including discussions about how much compensation the Met thought it should pay to the Menezes family; the risk that individual officers might face murder or manslaughter charges; the vulnerability of Blair and the Met to an action for civil damages; and whether Special Branch officers altered surveillance logs.

In May 2006, the Metropolitan Police Federation, a staff association that represents the interests of police officers, released a 12-page statement which was highly critical of the IPCC in general, and specifically criticized the handling of the "Stockwell inquiry".

=== Leak of inquiry ===
On 16 August 2005, British television network ITV released a report said to be based on leaked documents from the IPCC investigation which conflicted with previous statements by police chief Sir Ian Blair. The Met and the IPCC refused to comment on the allegations while the IPCC investigation was ongoing, though an anonymous "senior police source" claimed that the leak was accurate.

Canadian Lana Vandenberghe, the IPCC secretary who admitted responsibility for the leak, was suspended and subsequently sacked. The IPCC launched an investigation into the leaking of the documents. On 21 September, Leicester Constabulary Serious Crime Unit initiated dawn raids on behalf of the IPCC on one Scottish and two London residential premises, at which time Vandenberghe was arrested. Two more dawn raids took place on 5 October, during which ITN journalist Neil Garrett and his pregnant girlfriend Louise, were arrested.

On 4 May 2006, Leicestershire Police and the Crown Prosecution Service announced that no charges would be filed against Vandenberghe, Garrett, or his partner.

=== Stockwell 1 ===
According to a press release made on 9 December by the IPCC's chairman Nick Hardwick and John Tate, its Director of Legal Services, the inquiry's report would list some of the criminal offences that the commission thought may have been committed by police. Though without having reached any conclusions, they also admitted the commission's judgement would be a "lower threshold" than the standard prosecutors would apply in making any final decision to prosecute.

On 14 March 2006, the IPCC announced that the first part of the inquiry, known as "Stockwell 1" had been completed and recommendations were passed on to the Metropolitan Police Authority and Crown Prosecution Service, but the report "[could not] be made public until all legal processes have concluded".

The report was published on 8 November 2007.

=== Stockwell 2 ===
"Stockwell 2", the second part of the inquiry, focuses on the conduct of Sir Ian Blair and Andrew Hayman following the discovery of Menezes' identity, and was released on 2 August 2007. The allegations were that MPS officers "made or concurred with inaccurate public statements concerning the circumstances of the death. The alleged inaccurate information included statements that Mr. de Menezes had been wearing clothing and behaving in a manner which aroused suspicions."

=== Brian Paddick ===
On 17 March 2006, the Met was threatened with legal action by Deputy Assistant Commissioner Brian Paddick. In evidence to the IPCC, Paddick had stated that a member of Sir Ian's private office team believed the wrong man had been targeted just six hours after the shooting, contrary to the official line taken at the time. When this information became public, Scotland Yard issued a statement that the officer making the claim (Paddick) "has categorically denied this in his interview with, and statement to, the IPCC investigators". The statement continued that they "were satisfied that whatever the reasons for this suggestion being made, it is simply not true". Paddick's interpretation of this statement was that it accused him of lying.

After a statement was released on 28 March by the Met that it "did not intend to imply" a senior officer had misled the probe into the shooting of Jean Charles de Menezes, Paddick accepted the 'clarification' and considered the matter closed.

In a substantial campaigning Daily Telegraph interview (17 November 2007 – "I know how to make Londoners feel safe") which Paddick gave to support his suitability to become Mayor, he said "Policing is a dangerous job, we should trust the professional judgement of officers on the front line. We shouldn't prosecute them or their bosses if they decide to put their lives on the line for the public".

=== Investigation into suppression of evidence ===
On 13 October 2008, at an inquest into the death, a police surveillance officer admitted that he had deleted a computer record of Cressida Dick's instruction that they could allow Menezes to "run on to Tube as [he was] not carrying anything". At the inquest, he told the court that "On reflection, I looked at that and thought I cannot actually say that." The IPCC announced that it would investigate the matter "[at its] highest level of investigation".

== DPP and CPS involvement ==
In July 2006, the Crown Prosecution Service (CPS), which like the IPCC operates independently of the Met, announced that it would not carry forward any charges against any individual involved in the shooting of Jean Charles de Menezes. The decision not to prosecute individuals was made on the grounds of insufficient evidence. The family of Menezes appealed against the decisions of the office of the Director of Public Prosecutions (DPP) on behalf of the Crown Prosecution Service in the High Court.

On 14 December 2006, Lord Justice Richards, Mr. Justice Forbes, and Mr. Justice Mackay unanimously rejected an application for a judicial review into the decision of the office of the DPP on behalf of the CPS to rule out criminal prosecutions of the individual police officers who shot dead Jean Charles de Menezes, ruling that "[I]t was a reasonable decision … on the basis that they were likely to fail". Michael Mansfield, appearing for the Menezes family, had accused the CPS of "usurping the role of a jury".

The Metropolitan Police Commissioner in his official capacity faced criminal charges under sections 3(1) and 33(1)(a) of the Health and Safety at Work etc. Act 1974 for "failing to provide for the health, safety, and welfare of Jean Charles de Menezes".

The legal representatives of the Metropolitan Police Service, on behalf of the office of the Commissioner, pleaded not guilty to the charges, "after the most careful consideration". Commander Moir Stewart, co-ordinator of the MPS, said the service "profoundly questioned" whether health and safety at work legislation was right for evaluating an emergency service's actions "in relation to decisions made during fast-time, life-at-risk anti-terrorist policing operation".

The trial started on 1 October 2007. On 1 November 2007, a jury in the Old Bailey found the Metropolitan Police Commissioner in his official capacity guilty of the above offences, and his office was fined £175,000, together with £385,000 of legal costs. The Met published a terse release about this decision, and Len Duvall, Chair of the Metropolitan Police Authority, asked that the full report on the investigation be published.

== Controversy over police procedure ==
Much discussion following the shooting centered on the rules of engagement followed by armed police when dealing with suspected suicide bombers. Roy Ramm, a former commander of specialist operations for the Metropolitan Police, said that the rules had been changed to permit officers to "shoot to kill" potential suicide bombers, claiming that headshots are the safest way to kill a suspect without risking detonation of explosive devices.

The possibility of a police confrontation with a suicide bomber in the United Kingdom had reportedly been discussed following the September 11 attacks in the United States. Based on this possibility, new guidelines were developed for identifying, confronting, and forcefully dealing with terrorist suspects. These guidelines were given the code name "Operation Kratos".

Based in part on advice from the security forces of Israel and Sri Lanka—two countries with experience of suicide bombings—Operation Kratos guidelines allegedly state that officers should aim at the head or lower limbs when a suspected suicide bomber appears to have no intention of surrendering. This is contrary to the usual practice of aiming at the torso, which presents the biggest target, since a hit to the torso may detonate an explosive belt.

Sir Ian Blair appeared on television on 24 July 2005 to accept responsibility for the error on the part of the Metropolitan Police, and to acknowledge and defend the "shoot to kill" policy, saying:

There is no point in shooting at someone's chest because that is where the bomb is likely to be. There is no point in shooting anywhere else if they fall down and detonate it.

The Met's commissioner Sir Ian Blair, and his predecessor Lord Stevens, had expressed concern about the legal position of police officers who might kill suspected suicide bombers. There is no explicit legal requirement for armed officers to warn a suspect before firing, although guidelines published by the Association of Chief Police Officers say that this "should be considered". A potential suicide bomber is thought to represent a circumstance where warning the suspect may put the public at greater risk because the bomber may detonate his explosives after being warned.

Lord Stevens defended the policy he introduced, despite the error that had been made. Azzam Tamimi of the Muslim Association of Britain was critical, saying: "I just cannot imagine how someone pinned to the ground can be a source of danger." Other leaders of the UK's Muslim community took a similar view. Ken Livingstone, the then Mayor of London, defended the police as having acted in the way they thought appropriate at the time, and with the aim of protecting the public.

Confirmation bias on the part of the Metropolitan Police may have come into play in this case. Disconfirming evidence that Menezes was the suspect may have been present, but interpreted incorrectly. The threat of a suicide bombing on the Underground may have produced stress and time pressures in individuals within the department, which in turn could have affected their decision-making thresholds.

Owing to the controversy surrounding the death of Menezes, the codename of Operation Kratos was dropped from all police lexicon in 2007–08, although the tactics for dealing with a suicide threat remained broadly the same.

During the trial, an allegation was made that the police had manipulated a photo of de Menezes so as to increase his resemblance to a "terrorist", Hussain Osman. A forensic specialist concluded de Menezes' face "appeared to have been brightened and lost definition". However, when asked if there had been any manipulation of any of the primary features of the face he replied "I don't believe there has been any... but making the image brighter has changed the image."

== Jean Charles de Menezes Family Campaign ==
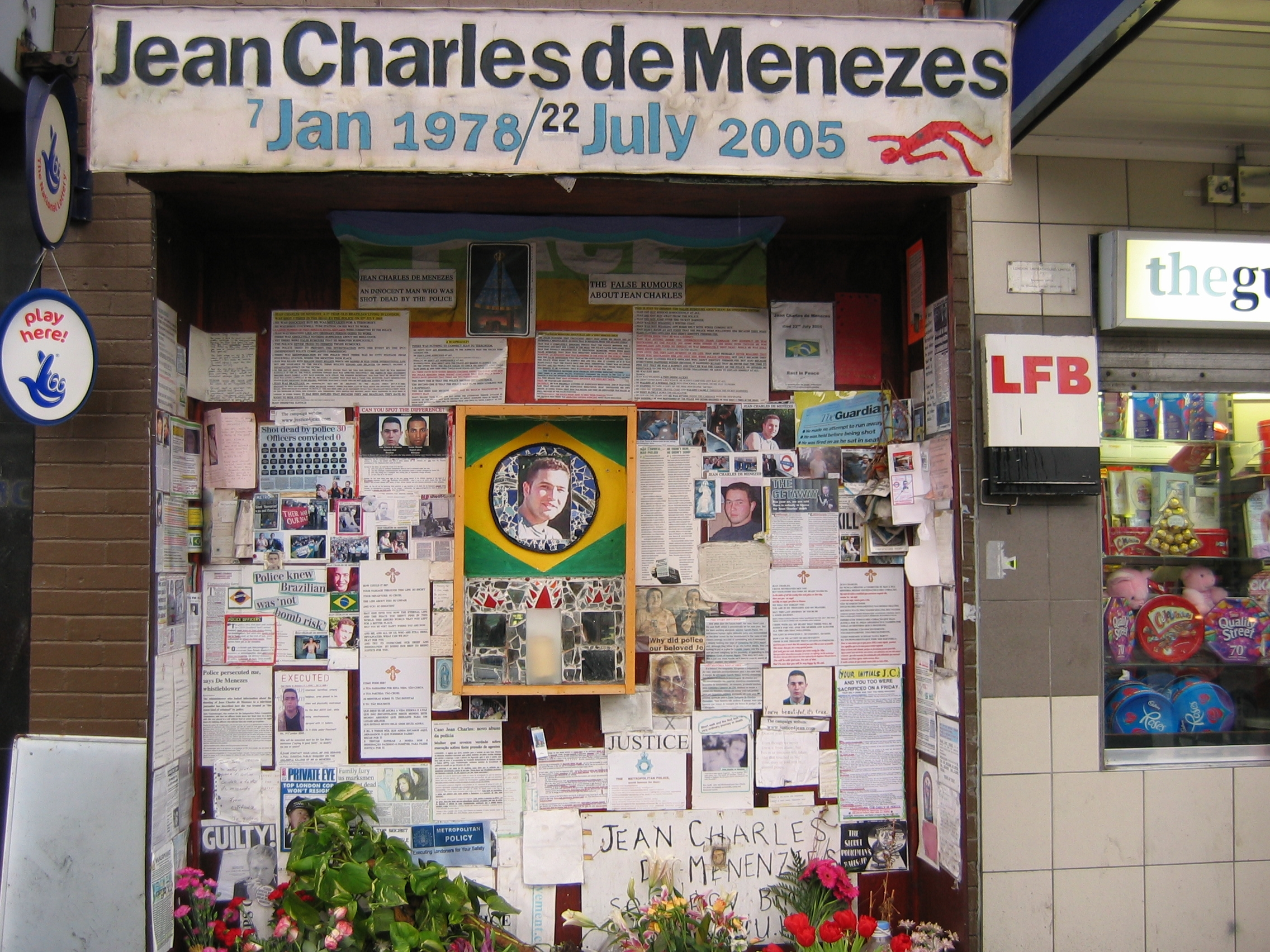
Shrine to Jean Charles de Menezes outside Stockwell Underground Station

On 16 August 2005, the Jean Charles de Menezes Family Campaign, also known as "Justice4Jean", began calling for a public inquiry into the "unlawful killing" of Menezes.

Critics such as Conservative London Assemblyman Brian Coleman have suggested that the involvement of Asad Rehman, a former leader of the Stop the War Coalition and former adviser to Respect politician George Galloway in the campaign shows that the family's campaign had been "hijacked" and the death of Menezes was being used to "advance a political aim". Galloway's secretary said that Rehman had been acting in "a personal capacity, … not in his role as political adviser", and Menezes family members Alessandro Pereira and Vivien Figueiredo denied any manipulation.

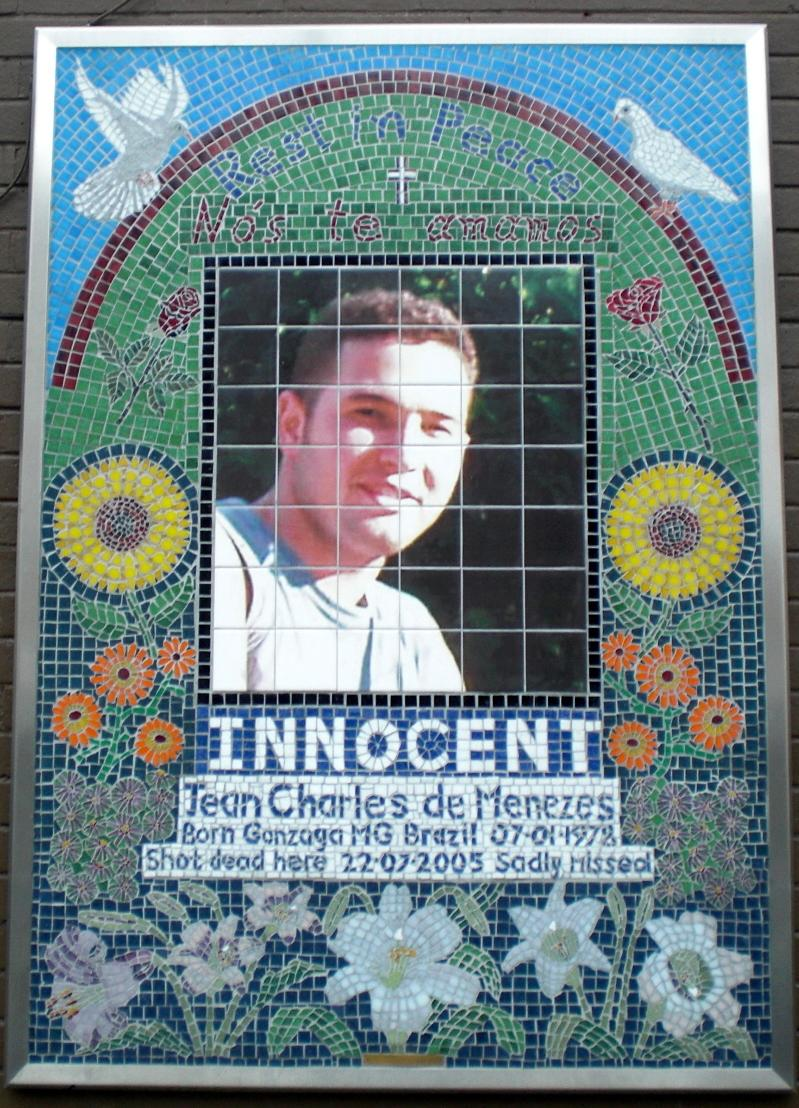
Mosaic outside Stockwell station

The family campaign organized three events in 2005:

- On 29 July, a vigil in Parliament Square and a multi-faith memorial service at Westminster Cathedral were held at the same time as Menezes' funeral in Brazil.
- On 22 August, a petition asking for a public inquiry was delivered to Downing Street by Menezes family member Alessandro Pereira and members of Justice4Jean. The protestors made their way from Downing Street to Scotland Yard, together with the relatives of Paul Coker and Azelle Rodney, individuals who also died in London police incidents in 2005.
- On 10 October, the campaign was launched at the London School of Economics with Menezes' parents, the family lawyer Gareth Peirce, Bianca Jagger, Matthew Taylor MP and Irene Khan from Amnesty International.

The family and their campaign continue to be actively supported by Newham Monitoring Project; on 22 July 2007 they held a minute of silence outside Stockwell tube station to commemorate the second anniversary of Menezes' death. Two days earlier the campaign projected a 20 metre by 30 metre (65' x 100') image of Menezes face with the slogan "Two Years, No Justice" on the walls of the Houses of Parliament. The campaign set up a blog for the duration of the inquest starting on 22 September 2008 and released a pre-inquest briefing.

On 7 January 2010, a memorial was unveiled at Stockwell tube station. It was made by local artist Mary Edwards, with the help of Menezes' cousin, Vivian Figueiredo, and Chrysoula Vardaxi, a member of a group that kept alive the memorial "shrine" to Menezes beginning within the days following his death.

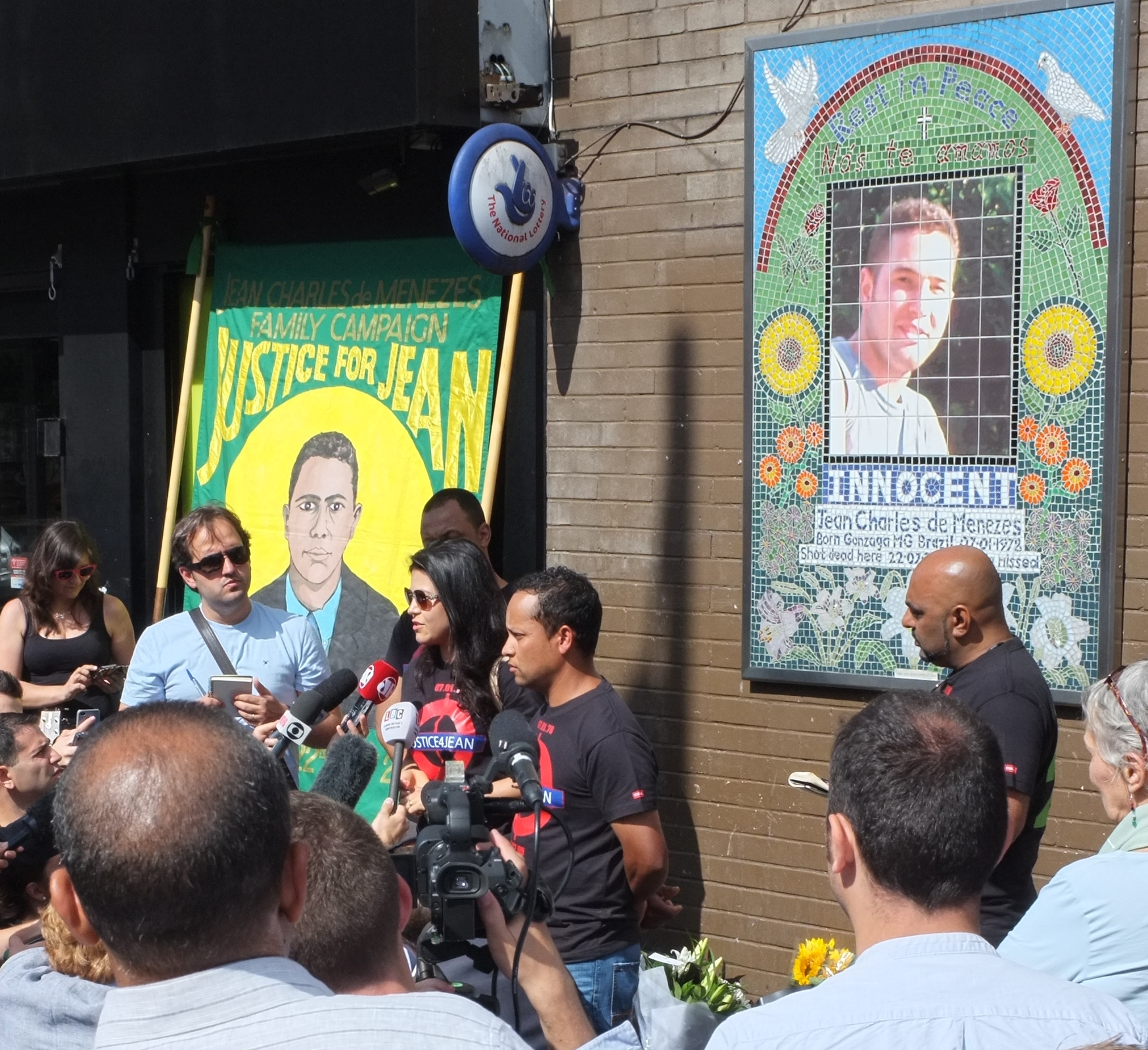
The Campaign commemorates the 10th anniversary of the shooting

=== European Court of Human Rights ===
On 10 June 2015, the Menezes family took the British government to the European Court of Human Rights over the decision not to prosecute anyone involved in the killing of Jean Charles de Menezes. The legal challenge was mounted under Article 2 of the European Convention on Human Rights regarding state deprivation of life and use of force.

On 30 March 2016, the Grand Chamber held—by a majority of 13 to 4—that there had been no violation of Article 2:

…the Court considered that all aspects of the authorities' responsibility for the fatal shooting had been thoroughly investigated […] The decision not to prosecute any individual officer was not due to any failings in the investigation or the State's tolerance of or collusion in unlawful acts; rather, it was due to the fact that, following a thorough investigation, a prosecutor had considered all the facts of the case and concluded that there was insufficient evidence against any individual officer to prosecute.

Dissenting judges highlighted concerns about the objective reasonableness of the "honest belief, perceived for good reasons" justifying the use of force; that officers were permitted to write their notes up together; that the threshold for prosecution was more stringent than in other states; and the incongruity that no individual was subject to disciplinary action despite a finding of institutional criminal responsibility under the Health and Safety Act.

== Inquest ==
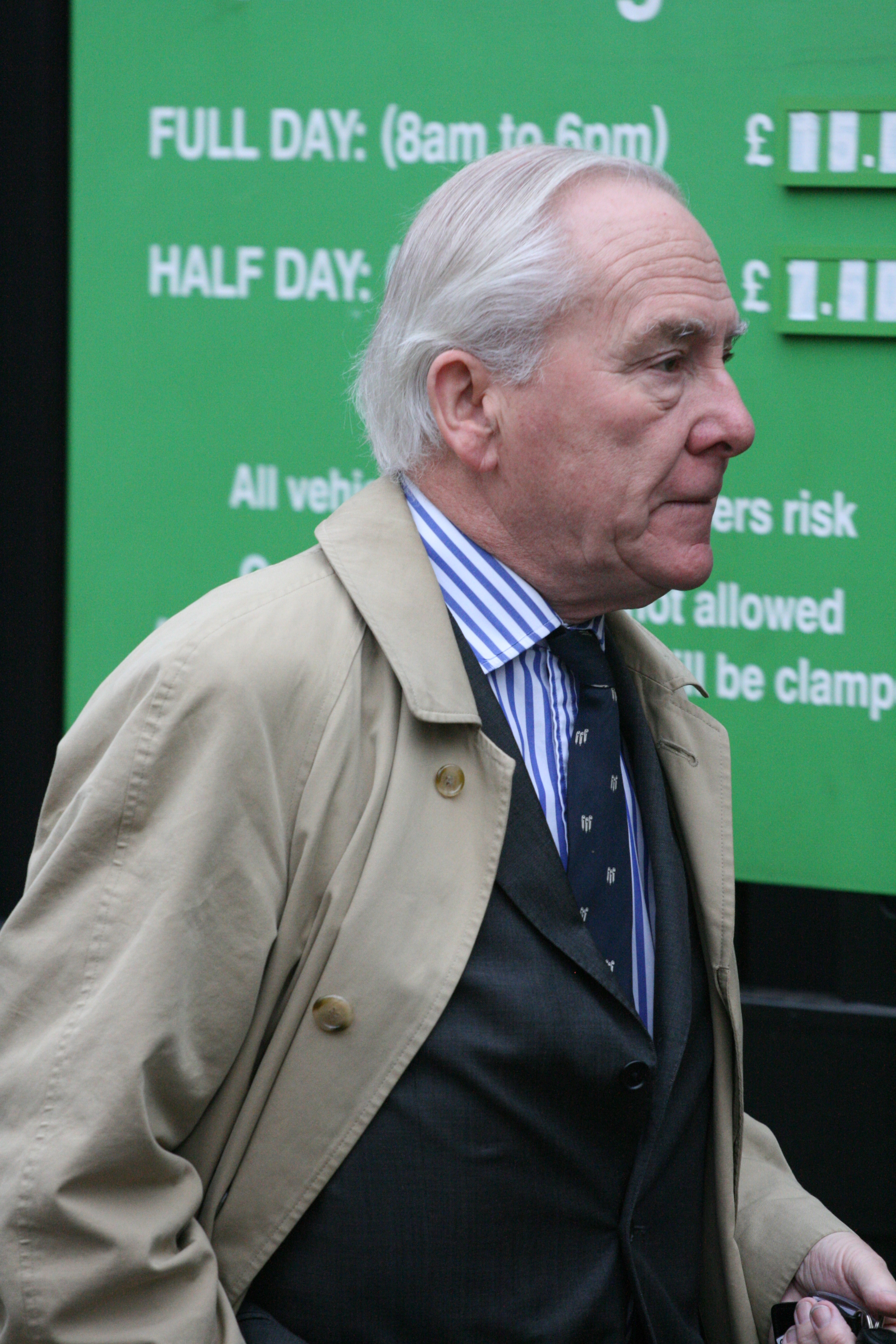
The coroner Sir Michael Wright arriving at The Oval on 5 November 2008

The inquest opened on 22 September 2008 at the John Major conference room at The Oval, Kennington, London. The coroner, Sir Michael Wright, a former High Court judge and assistant deputy coroner for Inner South London, and the jury heard from almost 70 witnesses, including over 40 police officers.

On the first day the inquest heard that the police officers who shot Menezes dead were "convinced" at the time that he was a suicide bomber. In his comments, Sir Michael Wright said that the two officers thought Menezes was about to detonate a "device" on the Tube. He took the inquest jury through the events leading up to Menezes's death, listing a number of occasions where officers were unclear whether or not they thought they were pursuing a bomber. The jury was told of differences between what was being relayed on radio and logged in the Scotland Yard control room and how the officers in the field were interpreting the information.

He said that when Menezes entered the Stockwell Tube station no member of the surveillance team had positively identified him as Hussain Osman. Regarding the decision of the two firearms officers to shoot Menezes, Sir Michael said that they had fired nine rounds between them, seven of which had struck Menezes's head at point blank range. He added that the two officers concerned were convinced that Menezes was a suicide bomber about to detonate a device, and that the only option open was an instant killing.

On 13 October, the IPCC launched an investigation after a Metropolitan police surveillance officer named only as "Owen" admitted that he had altered evidence submitted to the inquest. The officer had deleted one of his own computer notes which quoted deputy assistant commissioner Cressida Dick as concluding that Menezes was not a security threat. The note said "CD – can run on to tube as not carrying anything".

On 24 October the inquest heard that Menezes was initially not considered as a suspect, and that the police wanted unarmed officers to halt and question him in case he had information about the failed terrorist attack of 21 July 2005. Detective Sergeant Piers Dingemans and a four-man squad were tasked with stopping Menezes for intelligence purposes as he travelled to Stockwell station on a bus. Dingemans told the inquest that his car was behind the bus when he was stood down at 09:55, and said he thought this was because Menezes was then considered a suspect.

On 2 December Sir Michael ordered the jury, shortly before they retired to consider their verdict, that they could not return one of "unlawful killing", leaving their options as "lawful killing", or an open verdict. He said that the verdict could not be inconsistent with the earlier criminal trial. As well as the short-form verdict of "lawful killing" or "open", Sir Michael also asked them to respond to three questions of fact, and nine possible contributory factors with simple "yes", "no", or "cannot decide" answers. The Menezes family lodged an immediate application for a judicial review of the decision.

On 4 December, during Sir Michael's summing-up, members of the Menezes family got up and undid their jackets exposing printed slogans on their T-shirts, with the wording "Your legal right to decide – unlawful killing verdict", and left the courtroom after pausing for 30 seconds in front of the jury. The following day, Sir Michael asked the jury to ignore the protest. In his summing-up, Sir Michael stated that to return a verdict of lawful killing, the jury should be "satisfied of two matters on the balance of probabilities":

(a) that at the time they fired, Charlie 2 and Charlie 12 honestly believed that Mr de Menezes represented an imminent mortal danger to them and/or others around them; and

(b) that they used no more force than was reasonably necessary in the circumstances as they honestly believed them to be.

If the jury was not satisfied on both of these, they were to return an open verdict.

On 9 December the jury asked the coroner whether they were required to find unanimity on the short-form verdict and all of the additional questions. Sir Michael instructed them that they should strive for unanimity, but he would accept a 10–1 or 9–2 verdict. Later that day one of the jury was permanently dismissed owing to travel plans, reducing the jury to 10, and the following day Sir Michael said he would now accept a 9–1 or 8–2 verdict.

On Friday 12 December 2008, the inquest into Jean Charles' death returned an open verdict. Their answers to the specific questions and contributory facts were as follows. In the latter portion, the answers "yes", "no", and "can't decide" were determined by the jury while answering the broader question "which of these other factors, if any, contributed to the death".

Jury questions and answers
Questions of fact
"Did firearms officer C12 shout "armed police"?"	No
"Did Mr Menezes stand up from his seat before he was grabbed in a bear hug by officer Ivor?"	Yes
"Did Mr Menezes move towards C12 before he was grabbed in a bear hug by Ivor?"	No
Possible contributory factors
"The pressure on police after the suicide attacks in July 2005."	Cannot decide
"A failure to obtain and provide better photographic images of failed bomber Hussain Osman to surveillance officers."	Yes
"The general difficulty in providing identification of the man under surveillance in the time available."	No
"The fact that the views of the surveillance officers regarding identification were not accurately communicated to the command team and firearms officers."	Yes
"A failure by police to ensure that Mr Menezes was stopped before he reached public transport."	Yes
"The innocent behaviour of Mr Menezes increasing suspicion."	No
"The fact that the position of the cars containing the firearms officers was not accurately known by the command team as firearms teams were approaching Stockwell Tube."	Yes
"Shortcomings in the communications system between various police teams on the ground."	Yes
"Failure to conclude at the time that surveillance officers could have been used to carry out the stop on Mr Menezes at Stockwell."	Yes

The officer identified as "Ivor" was a member of a SO12 Special Branch covert surveillance team who had followed Menezes on the bus and attempted to identify him. He has also been designated as "Hotel 3". The officer identified as "C12" or "Charlie 12" was a member of a CO19 firearms unit who first opened fire and killed Menezes.

== Disputed facts and events ==
=== Clothing ===
With regard to his dress on the day of the shooting The Observer reported that he was dressed in "baseball cap, blue fleece and baggy trousers". Mark Whitby, a witness to the shooting, told Reuters that he observed Menezes wearing a large winter coat, which "looked out of place". Vivien Figueiredo, a cousin of Menezes, was later told by police that Menezes was wearing a denim jacket on the day of the shooting. Anthony Larkin, another eyewitness, told the BBC that Menezes appeared to be wearing a "bomb belt with wires coming out".

Based on these eyewitness reports, press speculation at the time said that wearing such heavy clothing raised suspicions that Menezes was hiding explosives underneath, and was therefore a potential suicide bomber. At the time of the shooting, the temperature in London (at a Heathrow Airport weather station) was about 17 °C (63 °F).

No device resembling a bomb belt was reported as found. Menezes was also not carrying a tool bag, since he had left it with his colleague the previous evening. According to the report on leaked IPCC documents, Menezes was wearing a pair of jeans and a light denim jacket. This was confirmed by a photo of his body on the floor of the carriage after the shooting.

=== Police challenge ===
Police initially stated that they challenged Menezes and ordered him to stop outside Stockwell station. Metropolitan Police Commissioner Sir Ian Blair said in a later press conference that a warning was issued prior to the shooting. Lee Ruston, an eyewitness who was waiting on the platform, said the police did not identify themselves. The Times reported "senior police sources" as saying that police policy would not require a warning to be given to a suspected suicide bomber before lethal action was taken.

The leaked IPCC documents indicated that Menezes was seated on the train carriage when the SO19 armed unit arrived. A shout of "police" may have been made, but the suspect had no opportunity to respond before he was shot. The leaked documents indicated that he was restrained by an undercover officer before being shot.

During the 2008 inquest into Menezes's death, passengers who were travelling in the same carriage also contradicted police accounts, saying that they heard no warnings and that Menezes gave no significant reaction to arrival of the policemen. One passenger said that Menezes appeared calm even as a gun was held to his head, and was clear that the police officers did not shout any warnings before shooting him.

=== Ticket barrier ===
Witnesses stated that up to twenty police officers in plain clothes pursued Menezes into Stockwell station, that he jumped over the ticket barrier, ran down an escalator and tried to jump onto a train. The Menezes family was briefed by the police that their son did not jump over the ticket barrier and used Oyster card to pass through; this was subsequently confirmed by CCTV recordings shown at the Metropolitan Police trial.

Kenneth Shorrock's post-mortem report, which was written five days after the shooting, recorded that Menezes "vaulted over the ticket barriers" and that he "ran down the stairs of the tube station". Shorrock later told the inquest that he had been given this information by police during a "walk-through" with officers at Stockwell Tube Station but he could not remember who had given him this incorrect information, which had also featured in earliest eyewitness reports.

It had been suggested that the man reported by eyewitnesses as jumping over the barrier may have been one of the police officers in pursuit.

=== CCTV footage ===
Initial UK media reports suggested that no CCTV footage was available from the Stockwell station, as recording media had not been replaced after being removed for examination after the previous day's attempted bombings. Other reports stated that faulty cameras on the platform were the reason for the lack of video evidence. An anonymous source confirmed that CCTV footage was available for the ticket area, but that there was a problem with the platform coverage. The source suggested that there was no useful CCTV footage from the platform or the train carriage.

Extracts from a later police report stated that examination of the platform cameras had produced no footage. It said: "It has been established that there has been a technical problem with the CCTV equipment on the relevant platform and no footage exists." The platform CCTV system is maintained by the Tube Lines consortium in charge of maintaining the Northern Line. The company made a statement to The Mail on Sunday insisting that the cameras were in working order.

During the inquest, evidence confirmed that the video tapes had been changed by a station supervisor in three video recorders monitoring the station CCTV at 3:09 am on the morning of the shooting. These machines emit an audible noise if they are not receiving an audio/video signal, but there was no indication the supervisor heard an alarm. Three days later the equipment was tested and it was found that a cable transmitting the CCTV images to the video recorders had been damaged or cut, possibly during refurbishment work (the cable may have been severed when a workman stepped on it); the following day a communications expert confirmed that the alarm was sounding as a result of this loss of signal.

The same police report also reported there was no footage from CCTV in the carriage where Menezes was shot, stating: "Although there was on-board CCTV in the train, due to previous incidents [the 7 July bombings], the hard drive had been removed and not replaced."

CCTV footage from the number 2 bus Menezes took to the station was also shown during the inquest; it too, was incomplete. The IPCC claimed this was due to excessive vibration, which prevented several cameras on the bus from working.

=== Motivations ===
Several reasons were initially posited by media sources and family members for why Menezes may have run from police, as indicated by initial reports. A few weeks earlier, he had been attacked by a gang and may have perceived that he was in a similar situation upon seeing plainclothes officers chasing him. Several sources have speculated that irregularities about his immigration status may have given him reason to be wary of the police; evidence introduced during the course of the criminal trial into the Health and Safety charge showed that Menezes was lawfully in the country on 22 July 2005. This is mentioned in the Stockwell One report, at footnote 4 on page 21. The Sydney Morning Herald reported that a colleague believed that Menezes ran simply because he was late for his job. It was later indicated by the leaked IPCC documents that Menezes may have run across the platform to get a seat on the train, and did not know at the time that he was being watched or pursued.

=== Gunshots ===
It was initially stated by police that Menezes was shot five times in the head. Mark Whitby, a passenger on the train Menezes had run onto, said: "one of [the police officers] was carrying a black handgun—it looked like an automatic—He half tripped… they pushed him to the floor, bundled on top of him and unloaded five shots into him." Another passenger, Dan Copeland, said: "an officer jumped on the door to my left and screamed, 'Everybody out!' People just froze in their seats cowering for a few seconds and then leapt up. As I turned out the door on to the platform, I heard four dull bangs." Menezes's cousin Alex Pereira, who lived with him, asserted that Menezes had been shot from behind: "I pushed my way into the morgue. They wouldn't let me see him. His mouth was twisted by the wounds and it looked like he had been shot from the back of the neck." Later reports confirmed that Jean Charles de Menezes was shot a total of eight times: seven times in the head and once in the shoulder.

The leaked IPCC documents also indicated that an additional three shots had missed Menezes. One witness claimed that the shots were evenly distributed over a timespan of thirty seconds. This has not been substantiated by other witness reports or the leaked IPCC documents.

=== Involvement of special forces ===
Several commentators suggested that special forces may have been involved in the shooting. Professor Michael Clarke, Professor of Defence Studies at King's College London, went as far as to say that unless there had been a major policy change it was likely that it was not the police who had carried out the shooting, but special forces:

To have bullets pumped into him like this suggests quite a lot about him and what the authorities, whoever they are, assumed about him. The fact that he was shot in this way strongly suggests that it was someone the authorities knew and suspected he was carrying explosives on him. […] You don't shoot somebody five times if you think you might have made a mistake and may be able to arrest him. […] Even Special Branch and SO19 are not trained to do this sort of thing. It's plausible that they were special forces or elements of special forces.

On 4 August 2005, The Guardian reported that the newly created Special Reconnaissance Regiment (SRR), a special forces unit specialising in covert surveillance, was involved in the operation that led to the shooting. The anonymous Whitehall sources who provided the story stressed that the SRR was involved only in intelligence gathering and that Menezes was shot by armed police, not by members of the SRR or other soldiers. Defense sources would not comment on speculation that SRR soldiers were among the plainclothes officers who followed Menezes onto the number 2 bus. On 21 August, the Sunday Herald reported that SRR men are believed to have been in the tube train when the shooting occurred.

Stockwell One states, of the SO12 surveillance teams:

During July 2005 each surveillance team had a member of the military attached to them. Those soldiers were unarmed.

In the transcript of the 2008 inquest, some of the soldiers' testimonies are recorded, including that of "Hotel 11" and that of "Frank".

== Legal settlement ==
The four-year legal battle by the family of Jean Charles de Menezes ended when they negotiated a settlement with the Metropolitan Police Service in November 2009. The MPS agreed to pay compensation to the family, who in return agreed to end their legal action. The sum of money involved in the settlement was reported to be just over £100,000; in addition the family's substantial legal costs were paid. In a joint statement with the family, the Metropolitan Police Commissioner made "a further unreserved apology to the family for the tragic death of Jean Charles de Menezes" and reiterated "that he was a totally innocent victim and in no way to blame for his untimely death".

One journalist reacted critically to the level of compensation paid by the Metropolitan Police, comparing the level of payout with awards by employment tribunals, and speculating that "perhaps [de Menezes'] life was worth less because he was poor."

== Similar incidents ==
Comparisons have been made between the death of Menezes and other innocent or unarmed men shot by British police officers in disputed circumstances, including Stephen Waldorf, James Ashley, Harry Stanley, and the Forest Gate raid.

== In media ==
=== Television ===
The Panorama episode "Stockwell – Countdown to Killing", shown on BBC One on 8 March 2006, investigated and partially dramatised the shooting.

The shooting was the subject of an hour-long "factual drama" titled Stockwell, first broadcast on the UK terrestrial channel ITV1 on 21 January 2009.

A two-part documentary titled Shoot to Kill: Terror on the Tube, first broadcast on Channel 4 on 10 and 11 November 2024, seeks to set the shooting in the context of the fear-filled atmosphere in London in July 2005 and includes an interview with the police officer who killed Menezes.

A four-episode dramatised mini-series titled Attack on London: Hunting the 7/7/ Bombers, published on Netflix in 2025, examines events from before the initial bombings, the backgrounds of the perpetrators, and the events that followed, including interviews with Tony Blair, and an MI5 inspector. The show re-enacts the movements of Menezes from his home to Stockwell Underground Station, and the movements within the station and on the train, in addition to interviews with police officers on the scene.

Menezes was played by Edison Alcaide in the Disney+ drama series Suspect: The Shooting of Jean Charles de Menezes (2025). Menezes' parents are among the consultants.

Line of Duty creator Jed Mercurio has said the series, which starts with armed police shooting an unarmed man, was inspired by the shooting of Menezes.

=== Film ===
A film about Menezes's life, titled Jean Charles, was filmed in 2008 and directed by Henrique Goldman. Selton Mello portrays Menezes and Vanessa Giácomo portrays his cousin. Many of the other roles were played by the actual friends and family of Menezes.

=== Theatre ===
The documentary play Stockwell opened in July 2009 at the Landor Theatre in Clapham in London. This play featured actors reading scripts edited by playwright Kieron Barry from transcripts of the inquest.

This Much Is True, written by Paul Unwin (co-creator of the BBC television show Casualty) and Sarah Beck, is a documentary stage play following the journeys of those caught in the wake of the shooting, weaving together testimony from Menezes's family, Justice4Jean campaigners, senior police officers and lawyers. The production ran at Theatre503 in Battersea from 27 October to 21 November 2009.

=== Music ===
"Hollow Point", from the album Handmade Life, a song about the shooting of Jean Charles de Menezes, was written by the English folk musician, songwriter and composer Chris Wood. "Hollow Point" won Song of the Year at the 2011 BBC Radio 2 Folk Awards, where Wood also won Folk Singer of the Year.

"Viisi laukausta päähän", from the album "uudet kymmenen käskyä(2006)", a song about the shooting of Jean Charles de Menezes, written by a Finnish metal band "Stam1na" The song's direct English translation means: "Five shots to the head".

Guillemots named one of their first singles "Trains to Brazil" in reference to the shooting.

During his The Wall Live concert series of 2010–2013, Roger Waters added an acoustic coda to "Another Brick in the Wall (Part 2)" with additional lyrics in honour of Menezes. A performance of the song was recorded and released in Roger Waters: The Wall, the live album and concert film, and called "The Ballad of Jean Charles de Menezes". During the show, an animation is projected onto the wall showing a silhouette of an underground train pulling into a station, The train comes to a stop, and the vocal narrative at the end of "Another Brick in the Wall (Part 2)" finishes with the line "stand still laddie", shots are heard and flashes of light seen in one carriage. The projection on the main circular screen then changes to a photo of Jean Charles de Menezes for the additional coda to the song.

=== Art ===
Since 2010, outside Stockwell Tube station, there has been a mosaic mural of Jean Charles de Menezes. Beneath de Menezes' smiling face is a single word in stark white capitals: "INNOCENT".

=== Poetry ===
"Stockwell Station," a short poem depicting people at Stockwell in the aftermath of the killing of Menezes, was written by Canadian poet Robin Durnford and published in the poetry collection A Lovely Gutting (McGill–Queen's University Press, 2012).

"The death of Jean Charles de Menezes," a poem recreating the moments leading to the killing of Menezes and questioning the right to represent his death, was written by Latinx poet Carlos A. Pittella and published by Frontier Poetry on April 11, 2023. The poem was awarded the 2022 Frontier Poetry Global Poetry Prize for the region of Europe, selected by judge Aria Aber, who commented on the piece: "The speaker moves swiftly, possessed by a kind of duende, lapping me up like debris in the eye of a hurricane. The addendum's lyric reckoning adds a texture of tenderness to the impossible condition of exile and state-sanctioned violence."

== See also ==
- List of killings by police in the United Kingdom
- Police use of firearms in the United Kingdom
- Deaths after contact with the police
