= Police use of firearms in the United Kingdom =

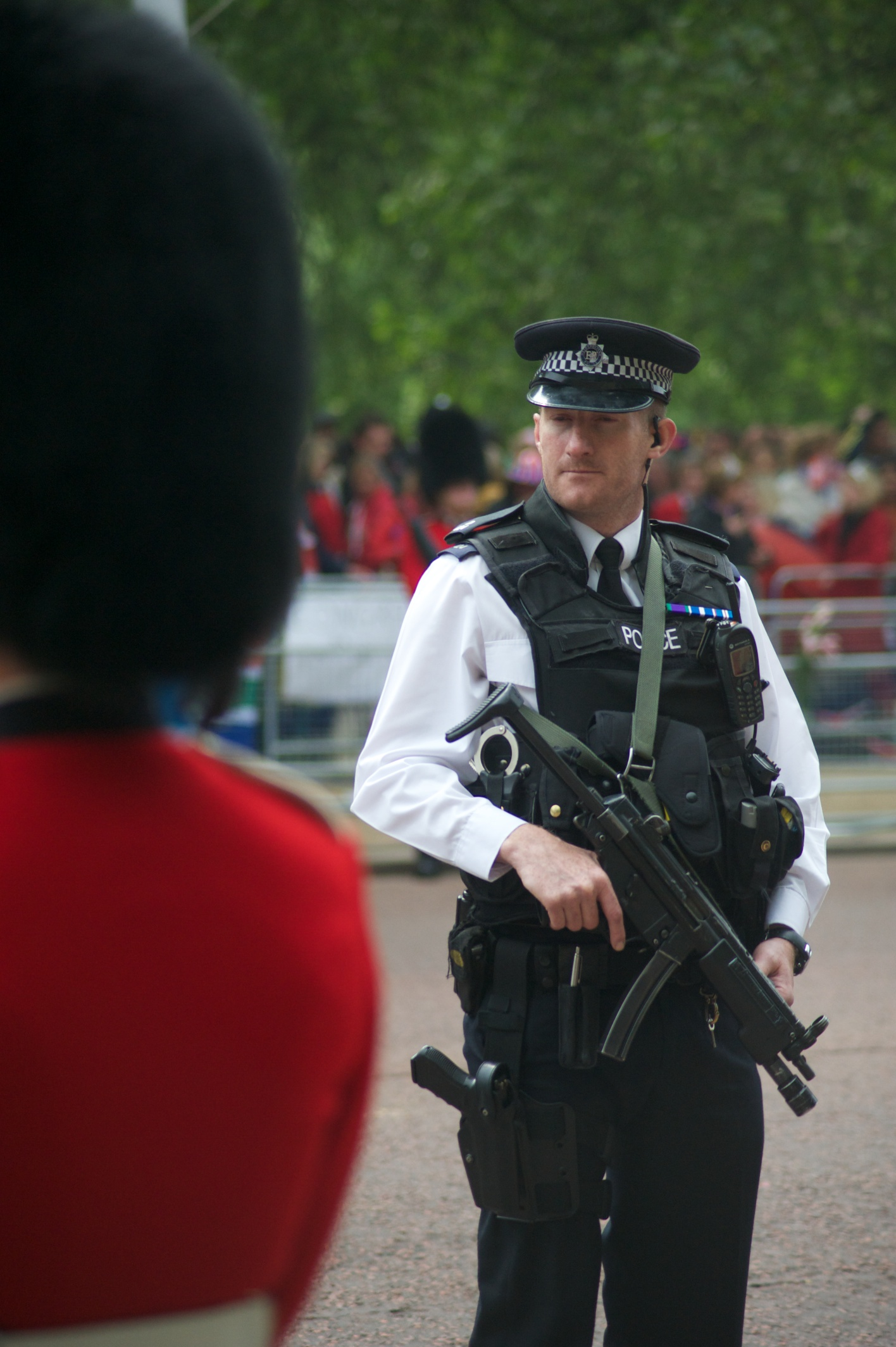
An authorised firearms officer in London, England on 29 April 2011 on duty for the wedding of Prince William and Catherine Middleton

In the United Kingdom, police firearm policy varies by constituent countries. In Northern Ireland, all police officers carry firearms whereas in the rest of the United Kingdom, firearms are carried only by specially-trained firearms officers.

The Police Service of Northern Ireland (formerly the Royal Ulster Constabulary), Northern Ireland Security Guard Service, Ministry of Defence Police, Civil Nuclear Constabulary, Belfast Harbour Police, Belfast International Airport Constabulary, and some of the Specialist Operations units of the Metropolitan Police involved in firearms and counter-terrorism policing are all issued firearms as a matter of routine. Every force also has a firearms unit, with armed response vehicles.

The vast majority of officers are instead issued with other items for personal defence, such as speedcuffs, extendable "ASP" batons, and incapacitant sprays such as PAVA pepper spray or CS spray. While not firearms, incapacitant sprays are subject to some of the same rules and regulations as a projectile firing firearm under Section 5 (b) of the Firearms Act 1968.

Since 2004, police forces have issued Tasers to Authorised Firearms Officers (AFOs) and Specially Trained Officers (STOs) for use against armed assailants which are considered by the authorities to be a less-lethal alternative to conventional firearms.

== History ==
The history of officers not being armed originates from the formation of the Metropolitan Police Service in 1829 and is partly due to public fears and objections of armed enforcers. It had been seen as the responsibility of the British Army to maintain order when needed.

=== Ireland ===
The Irish Constabulary (later known as the Royal Irish Constabulary), the police force in Ireland from 1822 until 1922, when the country was part of the United Kingdom, was a paramilitary force. Its members were armed with carbines and sword bayonets.

=== Northern Ireland ===
Male members of Northern Ireland's police force, the Royal Ulster Constabulary (RUC), were armed from the beginning due to the threat from the Irish Republican Army (IRA). The first female members were armed in 1993. Firearms were used routinely by the RUC during The Troubles, and a number of people were killed by RUC firearms or plastic bullets during that time. In 2001 the RUC became the Police Service of Northern Ireland (PSNI). It remained an armed police force, partly due to the continued threat from dissident Irish republicanism. Today, the PSNI have wide-ranging anti-terrorism powers through various acts of parliament not available elsewhere in the UK. Police officers at PSNI have access to a wide range of weapons, which include firearms, CS spray, water cannon, attenuating energy projectiles and tasers.

Northern Ireland also has a ballistics register, which covers both police and civilian-held firearms. It is mandated that during registration, all weapons undergo test firing and that the fired bullet and cartridge case must be stored by the police for the purpose of forensic examination. This is in the event that the weapon is used in a crime or when determining lawful shooting for police officers.

=== Great Britain ===
Police use of firearms in Great Britain has been tightly limited with senior officers, politicians and the general public preferring forces to retain an approach of policing by respect and consent.

During the Second World War, it was decided that police would provide armed guards at sites deemed a risk from enemy sabotage, such as 10 Downing Street and the Royal Family and to assist the British Armed Forces in the event of an invasion. Metropolitan Police officers were given access to an arsenal of weapons only to be used in case of invasion but were never taken on general patrol. To fire the Webley & Scott revolver, officers were expected to pass an exam consisting of firing six shots at a target with three shots needed to hit the target to pass.

On 1 June 1940, 3,500 Ross Rifles, which were phased out in 1916, and 72,384 rounds of .303 ammunition were distributed among police divisions.

After the Second World War, concerns were aired by the Home Office about the readiness of police forces in case of another war. It was decided that the Ministry of Defence would issue Sten guns, Lee–Enfield No4 Mk IIs, revolvers and ammunition to police divisions around the country. These were stored in secret depots around the United Kingdom, giving every force quicker access to the weapons.

Historically, officers on night patrols in some London divisions were frequently armed with Webley revolvers. These were introduced following the murder of two officers in 1884, although individual officers were able to choose whether to carry the weapons. Armed police were rare by the turn of the century, and were retired formally in July 1936. However, after the Battle of Stepney in 1911, Webley semi-automatics were issued to officers. From 1936, firearms could only be issued by a sergeant with good reason, and only then to officers who had been trained in their use.

The issue of routine arming in Great Britain was raised after the 1952 Derek Bentley case, in which a constable was shot dead and a sergeant severely wounded, and again after the 1966 Massacre of Braybrook Street, in which three London officers were killed. As a result, around 17% of officers in London became authorised to carry firearms. After the deaths of a number of members of the public in the 1980s fired upon by police, control was considerably tightened, many officers had their firearm authorisation revoked, and training for the remainder was greatly improved. As of 2005, around 7% of officers in London are trained in the use of firearms. Firearms are also only issued to an officer under strict guidelines.

To allow armed officers to respond rapidly to an incident, most forces have patrolling armed response vehicles (ARVs). ARVs were modelled on the "Instant Response Cars" introduced by the West Yorkshire Police in 1976, and were first introduced in London in 1991, with 132 armed deployments being made that year.

Although largely attributable to a significant increase in the use of imitation firearms and air weapons, the overall increase in firearms crime between 1998/99 and 2002/03 (it has been decreasing since 2003/04, although use of imitations continued to rise) has kept this issue in the spotlight. In October 2000, Nottinghamshire Police introduced regular armed patrols to the St Ann's and Meadows estates in Nottingham, in response to fourteen drug-related shootings in the two areas in the previous year. Although the measure was not intended to be permanent, patrols were stepped up in late 2001 after further shootings, after which the firearms crime declined dramatically.

In September 2004, the Parliamentary Under-Secretary of State for the Home Office approved the use of tasers throughout England and Wales by Authorised Firearms Officers following a trial. In November 2008, the Home Secretary approved the use of tasers throughout England and Wales for all officers, lifting the Authorised Firearms Officer restriction, with officers who receive training and carry a taser known as 'specially trained units' (STU's).

In 2010, following the serious injury of an unarmed officer in a knife attack, the chairman of the Police Memorial Trust, Michael Winner stated that he had put up memorials to 44 officers and that he believed, "It is almost certain that at least 38 of those [police officers] would be alive had they been armed". In response, chairman of the Metropolitan Police Federation Peter Smyth said, "A lot of police officers don't want to be armed. We don't want a call to arms, I don't think that's necessary."

In relation to specialist firearms officers, in the year 2011–12, there were 6,756 Authorised Firearms Officers, 12,550 police operations in which firearms were authorised throughout England and Wales and five incidents where conventional firearms were used.

In 2013, Police Scotland was formed with the inaugural Chief Constable granting a standing authority for ARV officers to overtly wear handguns, instead of being secured or concealed, and to deploy their weapons without requiring approval and also to be tasked for routine incidents (non-firearms incidents). A survey conducted by the Scottish Police Authority showed that 53% of the public supported sending ARV officers to routine calls and incidents while wearing a visible sidearm.

In May 2014, the Firearms Act 1968 was amended to recognise the British Transport Police (BTP) as a police force under the Act in order to provide BTP a firearms licensing exemption the same as other police forces. BTP had, since armed policing commenced in February 2012, required an Authorised Firearms Officer (AFO) to apply to their local police force in a private capacity for a firearms certificate to enable them to perform the AFO role.

In February 2015, The Times reported that most forces in England and Wales dispatch armed officers to domestic incidents and other routine police call-outs based on information released under Freedom of Information laws; of the 43 police forces sent a request by the Times, half gave only partial information or rejected requests outright.

Surveys by the Police Federation of England and Wales have continued to show police officers' considerable resistance to routine arming. Although in the Federation's most recent (2017) Officer/Arming survey, 66% of respondents were against the routine arming of police compared to 82% in 2006. Furthermore, 42.5% of respondents wanted firearms not to be issued routinely to all officers, but for more officers to receive training and issued firearms as needed.

== Legal status ==
The use of firearms by the police in England and Wales is covered by statute (such as the Police and Criminal Evidence Act 1984 and the Human Rights Act 1998), policy (such as the Home Office Code of Practice on Police use of Firearms and Less Lethal Weapons and the ACPO Manual of Guidance on Police Use of Firearms) and common law.

AFOs may only carry firearms when authorised by an "appropriate authorising officer". The appropriate authorising officer must be of the rank of Inspector or higher. When working at airports, nuclear sites, on Protection Duties and deployed in Armed Response Vehicles in certain areas, 'Standing Authority' is granted to carry personal sidearms. All members of the Police Service of Northern Ireland have authority to carry a personal issue handgun as a matter of routine, both on duty and off. In all forces, use of other weapons such as semi-automatic carbines requires further training and authorisation. Semi-automatic carbines are stored in a locked armoury inside Armed Response Vehicles. Equipping of semi-automatic carbines rests on a judgment of the AFO.

United Kingdom law allows the use of "reasonable force" to make an arrest or prevent a crime or to defend oneself. If the force used is fatal, then the European Convention of Human Rights only allows "the use of force which is no more than absolutely necessary". Firearms officers may therefore only discharge their weapons "to stop an imminent threat to life".

ACPO policy states that "use" of a firearm includes both pointing it at a person and discharging it (whether accidentally or negligently, or intentionally). As with all use of force in England and Wales, the onus is on the individual officer to justify their actions in court.

== Firearms used ==
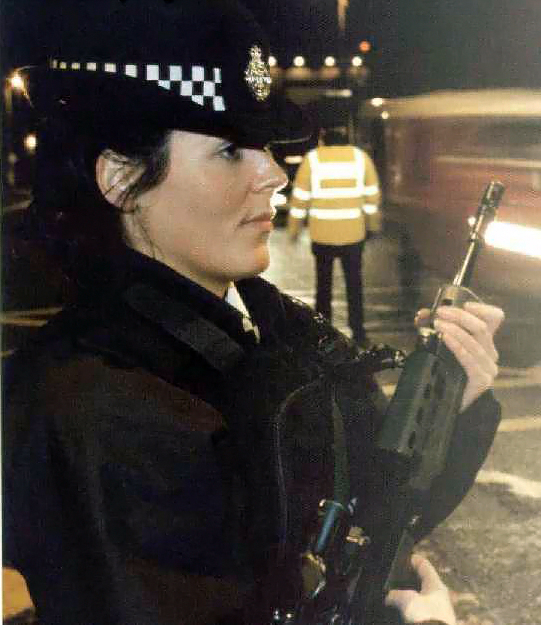
A Ministry of Defence Police officer on duty with an SA80 L85A2 assault rifle

Different police forces use a variety of firearms. Although for forces in England and Wales, guidance is provided from ACPO and the Home Office decisions on what weapons will be employed by an individual force largely rest with the Chief Constable.

In Northern Ireland, the PSNI issues all of its police officers with the Glock 17 pistol, and allows its officers to carry their issue sidearm off-duty.

== Notable incidents ==
According to an October 2005 article in The Independent, in the preceding 12 years, 30 people had been shot dead by police. Many police shootings in the UK were carried out by the Royal Ulster Constabulary (RUC) during the Troubles in Northern Ireland (1960s–1990s). During the conflict, RUC officers killed 56 people in shooting incidents, including at least 30 civilians and at least 20 members of paramilitary groups.

== "Shoot to kill policy" ==
The national media has criticised the policies of police forces which they have deemed "shoot to kill." Police firearms training teaches the use and discharge of firearms to "remove the threat" rather than to kill. Following the 11 September 2001 attacks new guidelines were developed for identifying, confronting, and dealing forcefully with terrorist suspects. These guidelines were given the code name "Operation Kratos".

Based in part on advice from the security forces of Israel and Sri Lanka—two countries with experience of suicide bombings—Operation Kratos guidelines allegedly state that the head or lower limbs should be aimed at when a suspected suicide bomber appears to have no intention of surrendering. This is contrary to the usual practice of aiming at the torso, which presents the biggest target, as a hit to the torso may detonate an explosive belt.

Sir Ian Blair appeared on television 24 July 2005 to accept responsibility for the error on the part of the Metropolitan Police in shooting Jean Charles de Menezes, mistakenly identified as a suicide bomber three days prior, and to acknowledge and defend the policy, saying that "There is no point in shooting at someone's chest because that is where the bomb is likely to be. There is no point in shooting anywhere else if they fall down and detonate it."

== Polling ==
A 2004 poll found that 47% of people supported all police officers being armed, with 48% opposed.

A 2017 Sky News poll carried out two days after the 2017 London Bridge attack and two weeks after the Manchester Arena bombing found that 72% of people supported all police officers being armed, with 20% opposed.

A 2019 YouGov poll that found 31% of people thought that police officers should routinely carry guns, with 55% opposed.

== See also ==
- Anti-terrorist policies of the Metropolitan police
- Police firearm use by country
- Shoot-to-kill policy in Northern Ireland
