= Neil Garrett =

British television producer/director (born 1975)

- Born: 20 September 1975 (age 50)
- Known for: British television producer and director

Neil David Garrett (born 20 September 1975) worked as a British television producer and director.

Garrett began his career in television in 1999, and became a producer for ITV News in 2003. In August 2005, he secured the leak into the investigation of the death of Jean Charles de Menezes. His dossier revealed crucial facts of the case, and police forensic photographs which proved that De Menezes had not jumped the ticket barrier, was not acting or dressed suspiciously. The shooting was the culmination of a catalogue of police surveillance and operational failings which had led to De Menezes death.

This scoop earned ITV News nominations for awards from the British Academy of Film and Television Arts and the Royal Television Society.

Six weeks after ITV news ran the story, Garrett and his pregnant girlfriend Louise, were arrested separately during raids by the Leicestershire Police Serious Crime Unit, who had been commissioned by the Independent Police Complaints Commission to investigate the leak.

He and Louise were detained in a central London police station and questioned over several hours, he also had personal computer and telecoms equipment seized from his home during the execution of a search warrant. Garrett answered bail on four separate occasions. Both he and Louise were eventually cleared of all wrongdoing on 4 May 2006. He wrote an account of his ordeal in a special report for The Guardian newspaper on 15 May 2006.
