= Ken Jones (police officer) =

British former police officer

Sir Ken Jones QPM
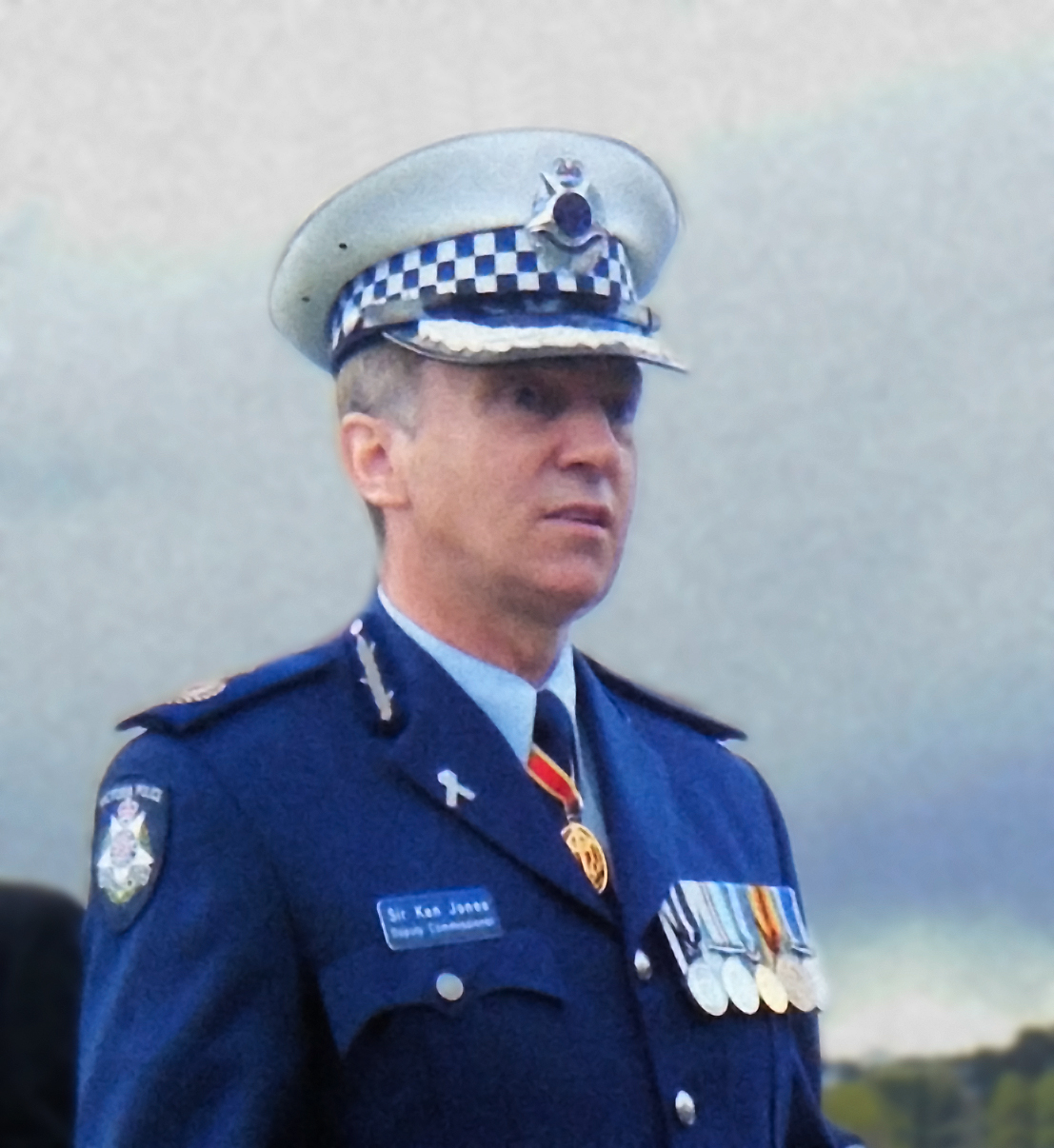
- Born: Kenneth Lloyd Jones; March 1952 (age 74); Wales
- Education: UCLA, University of Sheffield
- Police career
- Country: US; Hong Kong; AUS; UK
- Service years: 1971–2011
- Awards: Queen's Police Medal (2000); Knighted for CT work (2009)
- Other work: Defence and Security Advisor at the British Embassy, Washington DC, USA from 2013 to 2014

Sir Kenneth Lloyd Jones QPM (born June 1952) is a British former police officer. He is a former deputy commissioner of Victoria Police in Australia, a former President of the Association of Chief Police Officers of England, Wales and Northern Ireland in the United Kingdom, and Senior Investigator of Independent Commission Against Corruption (ICAC) in Hong Kong. He is a currently defence and security adviser at the British Embassy in Washington DC. He was awarded the Queen's Police Medal in 2000 and was knighted for services to policing in 2009.

== Early life and education ==
Jones was born in Wales and completed a BA (Hons) degree in 1985. He gained his MBA degree in 1992. In 1996, he won a Fulbright scholarship to study policing in the United States and was an associate professor at UCLA.

== Career ==
With South Yorkshire Police, Jones served in a number of cities including Sheffield, Rotherham, Barnsley and Doncaster, gaining experience with community beat duties, specialist detective work and the use of firearms. While there, he received three Chief Constable's Commendations. He has commanded both rural and urban divisions. He gained experience abroad working as an anti-corruption investigator in Hong Kong and as an election monitor in Zimbabwe. He visited the West Coast of the United States to study the growth of private policing.

Jones has also served in Africa (Zimbabwe-Rhodesia), the United States (as a Fulbright Scholar at UCLA in 1996) and Hong Kong (in the Independent Commission Against Corruption (ICAC)). He was appointed Assistant Chief Constable of Avon and Somerset Constabulary in 1997.

=== Chief constable in Sussex ===
In November 2001, Jones was promoted to Chief Constable of Sussex Police, serving until 2006.

=== President of ACPO ===
In 2006, Jones became the President of the Association of Chief Police Officers (ACPO). He was preceded by Sir Chris Fox (2003–2006) and followed by Sir Hugh Orde.

=== Deputy Commissioner of Victoria Police ===
On 25 May 2009, it was announced that he had been appointed as the Deputy Commissioner (Crime) for Victoria Police in Australia. He assumed the duties of this role on 1 July 2009.

=== Positions held ===
- World Regional Chair of the International Association of Chiefs of Police
- Chief Constable – Sussex Police
- Chief Constable and President – Association of Chief Police Officers of England, Wales and Northern Ireland
- Deputy Commissioner ( Crime ) – Victoria Police, Victoria, Australia
- Chair of the Sussex Criminal Justice Board
- Chair and Member of the ACPO's Terrorism & Allied Matters (TAM), London
- Board Member of National Policing Improvement Agency (NPIA)
- Board Member of National Policing Board (NPB)
- Board Member of the National Criminal Justice Board
- Board Member ( and occasional chair ) of HMIC's Senior Appointment's Panel
- Board Member (represented UK) on IACP in USA ( as well as World Regional Chair )
- Defence and Security Adviser – British Embassy, Washington DC
- Senior Investigator at Independent Commission Against Corruption (ICAC) Hong Kong

== Awards ==

Jones received the Queen's Police Medal in 2001 and was created a Knight Bachelor in the 2009 New Year Honours list.

== Death threats ==
In December 2010, it was revealed that Jones had received a number of death threats, and had been issued with a Glock pistol for protection.

== Media ==
During the time, Jones served Victoria Police Force he became the subject of death threats which came to public light in December 2010.

This signalled the start of the complicated relationship at the top of Victoria Police concerning the integrity of the presentation of crime statistics to the public between Jones and Chief Commissioner Simon Overland. Concerns have been raised about Overland's actions as there is an ongoing investigation into allegations of Overland's own conduct with the former Brumby government, in particular the release of incomplete favorable crime statistics prior to the 2010 election.

Jones had objected to this politicisation of policing. Jones was reportedly the subject of an investigation by the Office of Police Integrity requested by Overland, over Overland's suspicions that he helped media expose the cherry-picked crime statistics. However, these reports were found to be untrue and harmful to Jones' career in a report published by the Ombudsman. IBAC Press release, para 5: "Mr Kellams' review concluded that the evidence available to OPI and set out in OPI's final investigation report to the Ombudsman did not support an allegation that Sir Ken Jones QPM had engaged in serious misconduct by leaking or facilitating leaking to the media of confidential police information". This final report cleared Jones of any wrongdoing during his time at Victoria Police Force.

Police appointments
Preceded by Paul Whitehouse	Chief Constable of Sussex Police; 2001–2006	Succeeded by Joe Edwards
Preceded by Simon Overland	Deputy Commissioner (Crime) for Victoria Police; 2009–2011	Succeeded by Graham Ashton
