= Michael Wright (judge) =

British barrister and judge (born 1932)

Sir Michael Wright
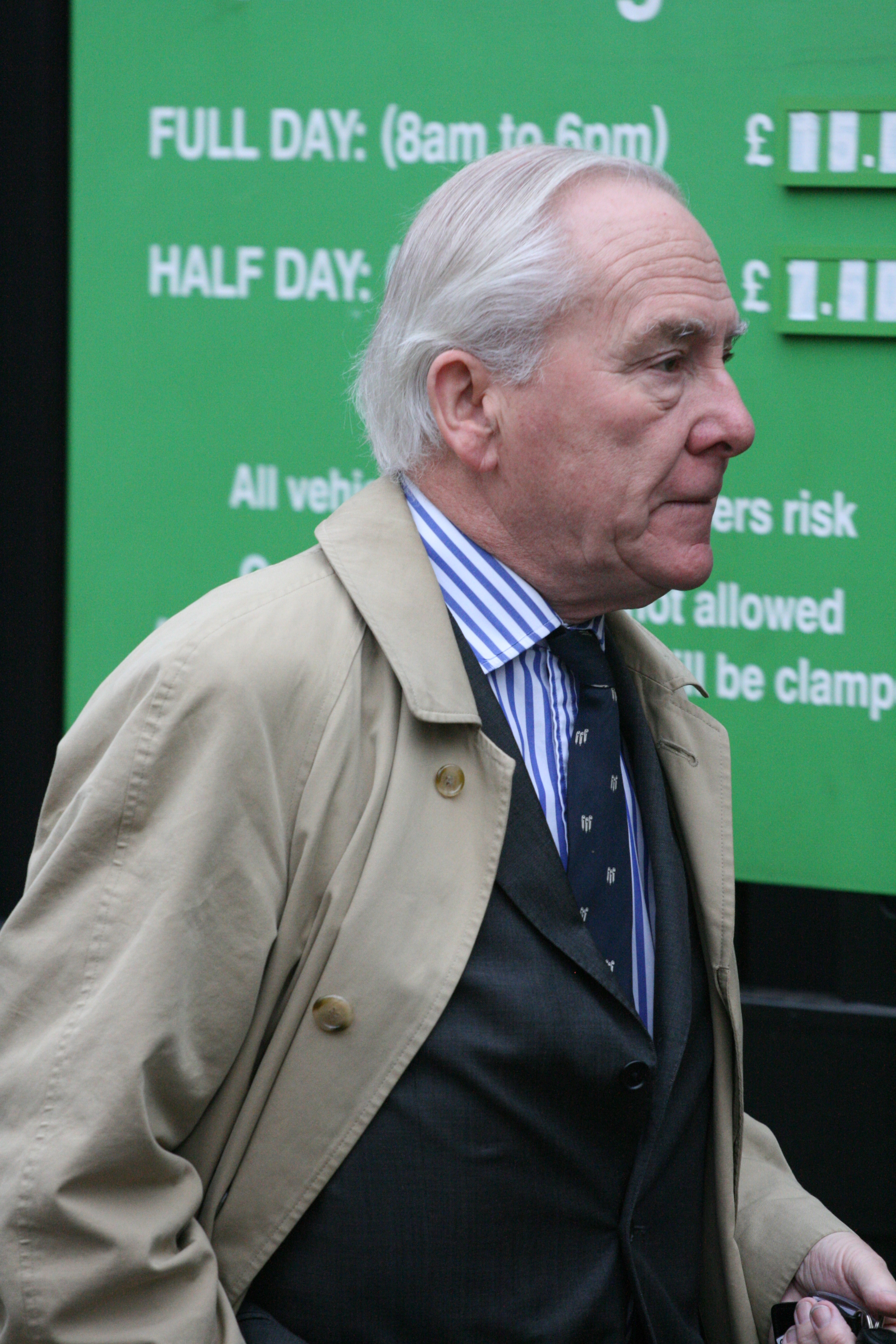
- Sir Michael Wright, Assistant Deputy Coroner for the purposes of hearing the Inquest into the death of Jean Charles de Menezes, arriving at The Oval, 5 November 2008

Justice of the High Court
- In office 1990–2003

Personal details
- Born: John Michael Wright
- Education: Oriel College, Oxford

Sir John Michael Wright (born 26 October 1932) is a retired British barrister and judge who served as a Justice of the High Court of Justice in the Queen’s Bench Division from 1990 to 2003. He is best known for presiding over the controversial inquest into the death of Jean Charles de Menezes.
