= Killing of Harry Stanley =

1999 fatal police shooting in London

On 22 September 1999, Harry Stanley was shot dead by police in South Hackney, London. Someone had called the police alleging that an Irishman carrying a gun in a plastic bag had been seen in the area. Police intercepted Stanley, challenged him and shot him. Stanley was found to be Scottish and in his bag was a table leg which had been repaired by his brother. Initially his death was recorded with an open verdict, before being ruled as unlawful killing by a jury on appeal and finally returned to an open verdict by the High Court.

== Shooting ==
On 22 September 1999, Stanley was returning home from the Alexandra Pub in South Hackney carrying, in a plastic bag, a table leg that had been repaired by his brother earlier that day. Someone had phoned the police to report "an Irishman with a gun wrapped in a bag".

At the junction of Fremont Street and Victoria Park Road in South Hackney, close to his home, Inspector Neil Sharman and PC Kevin Fagan, the crew of a Metropolitan Police armed response vehicle challenged Stanley from behind. As he turned to face them, they shot him dead at a distance of 15 feet (5 m).

== Harry Stanley ==
Stanley was born in Bellshill, near Glasgow, Scotland, where he lived for the first 19 years of his life. He moved to London in the early 1970s in search of work, and married his childhood sweetheart, Irene. They had three children, and grandchildren, and lived in Hackney, east London. He had a previous criminal record, being convicted of armed robbery in 1974, and had served 4 years in prison for grievous bodily harm.

This was unknown to the police officers who responded to the call about "an Irishman with a gun wrapped in a bag".

== Inquests ==
=== Inquest 1 ===
The first inquest took place in 2002 and the jury returned an open verdict. Stanley's family were unhappy with this outcome, particularly as the coroner, Dr. Stephen Chan, had only allowed the jury to return either a verdict of lawful killing or an open verdict.

Stanley's widow, Irene, petitioned the High Court and succeeded in obtaining a judicial review of the first inquest. On 7 April 2003, Mr Justice Silber ordered a fresh inquest after ruling that there had been an "insufficient inquiry".

=== Inquest 2 ===
During the second inquest, which took place in 2004, coroner Dr. Andrew Reid heard that the two officers fired the shots after being given wrong information in a tip-off; they had been told that Stanley was carrying a weapon and had an Irish accent. The jury returned a verdict, in November 2004, of unlawful killing, which resulted in the suspension of the officers involved.

In protest at the suspensions, over 120 out of the 400 Metropolitan Police officers authorised to use firearms handed in their firearms authorisation cards, with Glen Smyth, a Police Federation spokesman saying, "The officers are very concerned that the tactics they are trained in, as a consequence of the verdict, are now in doubt." The officers' suspensions were lifted shortly afterwards.

In May 2005 the High Court decided that there was "insufficient evidence" for the verdict of unlawful killing, overturning it and reinstating the open verdict of the first inquest. Mr. Justice Leveson also decided a third inquest should not be held, but added his weight to calls for reform of the inquest system. Glen Smyth described the ruling as "common sense", but the campaign group Inquest was disappointed, saying the verdict sent "a message that families cannot have any confidence in the system. They feel they cannot get justice when a death in custody occurs."

== Scrutiny of police behaviour ==
On 2 June 2005, the two officers involved in the shooting were arrested and interviewed, following an investigation by Surrey Police involving new forensic evidence. The Crown Prosecution Service decided in October 2005 not to press charges, saying that they "concluded that the prosecution evidence is insufficient to rebut the officers' assertion that they were acting in self defence".

On 9 February 2006, the Independent Police Complaints Commission published their report into the incident, recommending that no further disciplinary action be taken against the officers. Representatives of the Stanley family expressed their "bitter disappointment" and stated the case was a failure of the criminal justice system.

The Metropolitan Police Federation stated, "We are, of course, delighted by the vindication of the officers. But we remain deeply disturbed at the way the whole matter has been handled." The Stanley family issued a press release condemning the vindication of the officers.

== See also ==
- Police use of firearms in the United Kingdom
