= Gonzaga, Minas Gerais =

Municipality in the state of Minas Gerais, in Brazil

Coordinates: 18°49′19″S 42°28′44″W

- Municipality
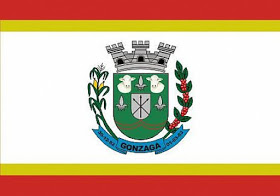
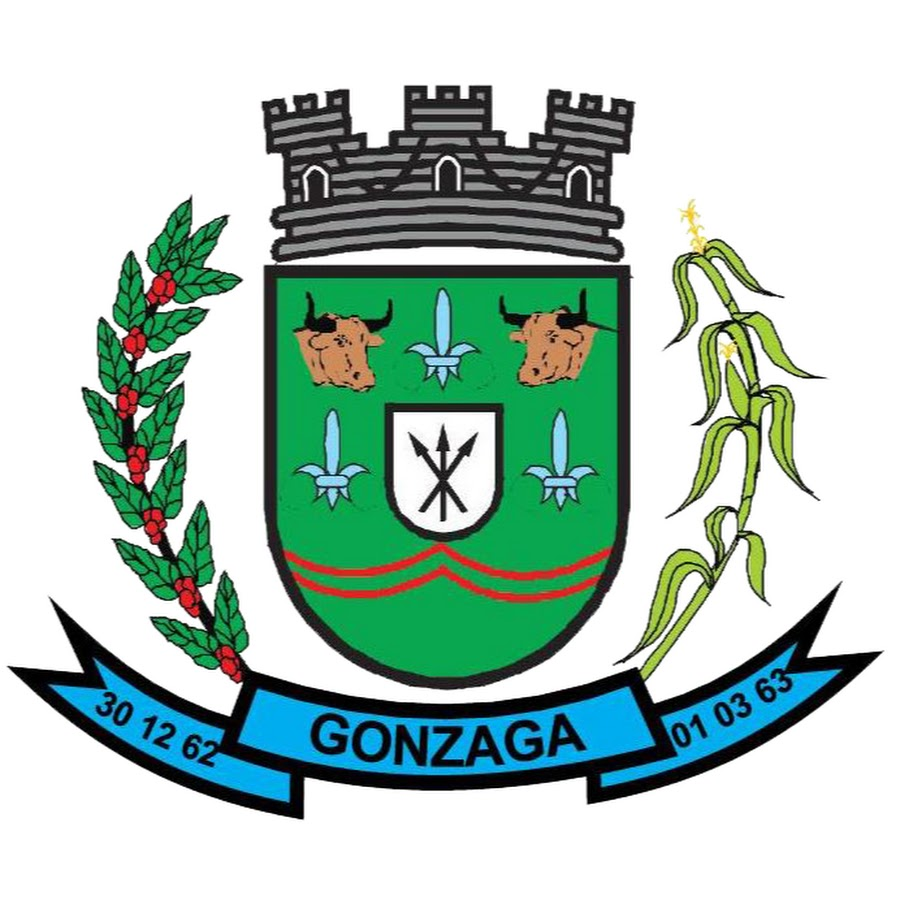
- Flag Coat of arms
- Interactive map of Gonzaga, Minas Gerais
- Country: Brazil
- State: Minas Gerais
- Region: Southeast

Population (2022 Census)
  - Total: 5,230
  - Estimate (2025): 5,235
- Time zone: UTC−3 (BRT)

Gonzaga is a Brazilian municipality in the state of Minas Gerais, in Brazil. It is situated in the Governador Valadares metropolitan area.

Its population was estimated at 5,235 in 2025.

It is Jean Charles de Menezes's native city.

The mayor of Gonzaga is currently Julio Maria de Sousa.

== See also ==
- List of municipalities in Minas Gerais
