= Operation Kratos =

Police tactics for dealing with suicide bombers

Operation Kratos was a set of tactics developed by London's Metropolitan Police Service for dealing with suspected suicide bombers, most notably firing shots to the head without warning. The tactics were developed shortly after the 11 September 2001 attacks, based in part on consultation with Israeli and Sri Lankan law enforcement agencies on how to deal with suicide bombers. Little was revealed about these tactics until after the mistaken shooting of Jean Charles de Menezes on 22 July 2005, in the wake of the 7 July 2005 London bombings. The term is no longer used by the Metropolitan Police, although similar tactics remain in force.

== Development ==
After the 11 September 2001 attacks, many police agencies worldwide began to seriously consider the possibility of suicide attacks in their own home countries and cities. A Metropolitan Police team led by Barbara Wilding, Deputy Assistant Commissioner Specialist Operations, visited Israel, Sri Lanka and Russia, to learn from their experience of suicide attacks. They also consulted UK government scientists.

Key findings were:

- The explosives used by suicide bombers were very sensitive, and were likely to be detonated by the conventional tactic of firing at the chest, as well as by less-lethal weapons.
- Suicide bombers were likely to detonate their devices on realising that they had been identified. Police must act covertly, and tactics must ensure immediate incapacitation to give the bomber no opportunity to detonate the bomb.

New tactics were developed in the first half of 2002 by Wilding and David Veness, Assistant Commissioner Specialist Operations. These were designated Operation Kratos, named after the Greek demi-god Kratos (Ancient Greek: κράτος, lit. 'strength or power'). Work on the policy was taken over by the Terrorism and Allied Matters Committee of the Association of Chief Police Officers (ACPO) in January 2003. A paper entitled Operation Kratos People was circulated among UK police forces, and Operation Kratos became national policy.

== Details ==
Operation Kratos is the collective name for a range of anti-terrorist tactics, specifically:

- Operation Andromeda, "designed to deal with the spontaneous sighting by a member of the public of a suspected suicide bomber."
- Operation Beach, "where there is an intelligence-led covert operation to locate and arrest persons suspected of involvement in acts of terrorism."
- Operation Clydesdale, "where intelligence has been received about a suicide attack on a pre-planned event."

These plans deal with identifying and confronting suicide attackers. Ideally, the confrontation would be arranged in a secluded location to avoid risk to police officers and members of the public. In extreme situations, the policy recommends that covert police officers fire on suspected suicide attackers without warning, aiming multiple shots at the brain stem to minimise the risk of detonation of a bomb. The Metropolitan Police and other forces also issue Kratos officers with hollow-point bullets, but this has not been incorporated into national guidance.

The decision whether to take such drastic action would be made by a Designated Senior Officer (DSO), an officer of Commander or Deputy Assistant Commissioner rank designated for that incident. The Met had previously used an on-site Designated Senior Officer in policing the Notting Hill Carnival, to decide whether to employ baton rounds should a riot develop, but the situation never arose. To deal with the more severe challenge of suicide bombers, Kratos DSOs would be centrally located, and would be available at all times.

== London bombings and the de Menezes shooting ==
After the bombings of 7 July 2005, an internal email was sent to specialised police units reminding them of the secret tactics for dealing with suicide bombers. Operation Kratos was first described publicly in an article in The Scotsman on 15 July 2005. Between 21 July and 5 August, Designated Senior Officers were alerted on 11 occasions, with Armed Response Units deployed to 6 of these incidents. On one of these occasions, they opened fire.

In the evening after the attempted 21 July 2005 London bombings, Specialist Firearms Officers supporting the search for the bombers were issued with hollow-point bullets. When police linked Hussain Osman and another suspect to a block of flats in Brixton, the block was placed under surveillance. Commander Cressida Dick, who would also act as Gold Commander of the operation, was appointed as Kratos DSO. The firearms team were informed that they faced suicide bombers, that a DSO was in place, and that they might be required to use "unusual tactics".

On the morning of 22 July, surveillance officers believed that a man leaving the flats might have been Osman. In fact, the man was Jean Charles de Menezes, a Brazilian immigrant who had no connection to the bombers other than living in the same block as Osman. As the firearms team was not at the site (for unknown reasons), one of the watchers followed him onto a bus. de Menezes's innocent actions were misinterpreted as counter-surveillance measures, and a firearms team was called to intercept him. By the time they had arrived, de Menezes had entered Stockwell tube station and boarded a Tube train. Although no Kratos codeword had been given, the firearms officers believed him to be a suicide bomber. A surveillance officer seized de Menezes in a bear hug, and two plainclothes armed officers fired a total of nine shots, six of which struck his head from distances of 1 to 8 cm (1/2 to 3 in). Menezes died immediately at the scene.

== Reaction to the shooting ==
The manner of the killing was such a departure from previous police practice that observers speculated that it had been carried out by military special forces. Most commentators agreed that the authorities must have been certain of an imminent threat to order such drastic action. After the police admitted that they had shot an innocent man, the Operation Kratos policies came to national and international attention, with some commentators decrying the policies as unnecessarily violent and ineffective, and others supporting the difficult decisions made by the police in fighting terrorism.

An Independent Police Complaints Commission (IPCC) report identified a series of errors on the part of police, and recommended a number of changes. No individual officers were charged, but the Metropolitan Police were later found guilty of breaching the Health and Safety at Work etc. Act 1974 and fined. The inquest into the death of de Menezes made further criticisms of the police, and returned an open verdict.

ACPO reviewed Operation Kratos in March 2006 and declared it still "fit for purpose". The Met made changes to the command structure of Operation Kratos after the shooting. In the future, authorisation of a critical shot would be communicated by a clear English phrase rather than code-words. Authorisation would still come from specially trained officers of Commander rank or higher, but these would now be called Extreme Threat Tactical Commanders rather than DSOs. Despite the high rank of this officer, they would not command the whole operation, but would monitor the operation and take over tactical command when a threat of suicide bombing became apparent. The number of such officers in the Met would be reduced to 12, and they would receive more intensive training. The term Operation Kratos was dropped at the beginning of 2008.

== Wooden Pride ==
After the 2008 Mumbai attacks by a group of highly trained men armed with automatic weapons, the MPS strategic planning team reviewed their planned response to a similar attack on an urban area in the UK. They concluded that the police armed units were inadequate to cope with such a situation and would have to rely on military special forces. Police firearms were upgraded and in a series of exercises over the following years called "Wooden Pride", police counter-terrorism and firearms units practiced a coordinated response with the Special Air Service and Special Boat Service.
