= Paul Whitehouse (police officer) =

British police officer

Paul Chapple Whitehouse (born 26 September 1944) was, between 1993 and 2001, the Chief Constable of Sussex Police, resigning after criticism by the Home Secretary, after a career starting in 1967. He was Chairman of the Gangmasters Licensing Authority from 2005–2011.

In 1972, he founded Starehe UK, a charity which supports boys and girls at the two Starehe schools in Kenya. He was the vice-chairman of Nacro until the end of 2007 when he was appointed Chairman of the Board of Governors of Sidcot School. From November 2011 to February 2014, he was Chair of Trustees at Anti-Slavery International. He is a Director of Friends Trusts Limited, the denominational trust corporation of the Religious Society of Friends, and a Trustee of Tim Field Foundation.

Whitehouse retired to North Somerset in 2007, where having been involved in heritage railways since 1988, he is active on the West Somerset Railway as a signalman and member of the S&T Gang.
