= 1953 Coronation Honours =

Appointments by Queen Elizabeth II to various orders and honours

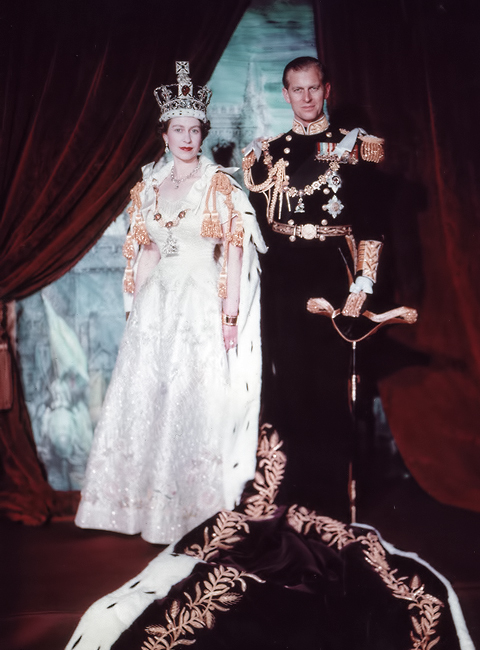
Coronation portrait of Elizabeth II and Prince Philip

The 1953 Coronation Honours were appointments by Queen Elizabeth II to various orders and honours on the occasion of her coronation on 2 June 1953. The honours were published in The London Gazette on 1 June 1953.

The recipients of honours are displayed here as they were styled before their new honour. They are arranged by honour, with classes (Knight, Knight Grand Cross, etc.) and then divisions (Military, Civil, etc.) as appropriate.

== United Kingdom and the Commonwealth ==
=== Peerages ===
==== Viscounts ====
- The Rt. Hon. Frederick Marquis, Baron Woolton CH DL Chancellor of the Duchy of Lancaster since 1952; Minister of Food, 1940–1943; Minister of Reconstruction and member of War Cabinet, 1943–1945; Lord President of the Council, 1945 and 1951–1952; by the name, title and style of Viscount Woolton, of Liverpool in the County Palatine of Lancaster.

==== Barons ====
- Sir Peter Bennett OBE JP MP Unionist Member of Parliament for Edgbaston since 1940. Parliamentary Secretary, Ministry of Labour and National Service, 1951–1952. For political and public services; by the name, style and title of Baron Bennett of Edgbaston, of Sutton Coldfield in the County of Warwick.
- Sir Ralph Glyn Bt MC DL MP Unionist Member of Parliament for Abingdon since 1924 and for Clackmannan and East Stirlingshire, 1918–1922. Chairman, Select Committee of House of Commons on Estimates since 1951. For political and public services; by the name, style and title of Baron Glyn, of Farnborough in the County of Berks.
- Sir Alfred Suenson-Taylor OBE President, London Liberal Party. For political and public services; by the name, style and title of Baron Grantchester, of Knightsbridge in the City of Westminster.

=== Privy Counsellors ===
The Queen appointed the following to Her Majesty's Most Honourable Privy Council:

- Sir Edward Bridges GCB GCVO MC
- Sir Norman Brook GCB
- John Edwards OBE MP
- The Hon. Harold Holt
- The Hon. John McEwen
- Sir Patrick Spens KBE QC MP

=== Baronetcies ===
- Alfred Bossom JP MP
- Sir Percy Mills KBE
- Sir Henry Price
- Major-General Sir Edward Spears KBE CB MC
- Sir Herbert Williams MP

=== Knights Bachelor ===
- Stephen Cecil Armitage CBE Alderman, Nottingham City Council
- John Dunamace Heaton-Armstrong MVO Chester Herald
- Geoffrey Morris Barnett, For political and public services in Leicester.
- Dingwall Latham Bateson CBE MC President of the Law Society
- Alderman John William Bowen CBE JP Chairman of the North East Metropolitan Regional Hospital Board, and the National Health Service General Whitley Council
- John Bevan Braithwaite, Chairman, Council of the Stock Exchange
- Edward Crisp Bullard, Director, National Physical Laboratory, Department of Scientific and Industrial Research
- Sydney Camm CBE Director and Chief Designer, Hawker Aircraft, Ltd.
- Professor David Campbell MC President of the General Medical Council
- George Norman Clark, Provost of Oriel College, Oxford. For services to the study of history.
- Bernard Henry Coode CB Clerk of Committees, House of Commons
- Leonard Lumley Savage Dodsworth JP For political and public services in York.
- Patrick William Donner MP Conservative Member of Parliament for Basingstoke since 1935 and for West Islington, 1931–35. For political and public services.
- Walter James Drummond, Deputy Chairman, National Coal Board
- Edward Brown Ferguson, Chairman, British Insurance Association
- Major John Frederick Ferguson CBE Chief Constable, Kent County Constabulary
- Ernest Wensley Lapthorn Field CBE Director, Scottish Engineering Employers' Association
- Lionel Wray Fox CB MC Chairman of the Prison Commission for England and Wales
- Arthur John Gielgud, Actor
- Colonel Louis Halle Gluckstein QC TD DL Conservative Member of Parliament for East Nottingham, 1931–45. For political and public services.
- Stuart Coldwell Goodwin JP For political and public services in Sheffield
- David Edward Griffiths OBE Vice-Chairman of the Executive Committee, Royal Air Force Cinema Corporation
- Alderman William Josiah Grimshaw JP For political and public services in Middlesex
- Kenneth George Grubb CMG President of the Church Missionary Society
- John Berry Hobbs, For services to cricket.
- The Honourable Francis John Hopwood, Managing Director, Shell Transport and Trading Company, Ltd.
- Harry Hyde JP For political and public services in Lancashire.
- Hugh Nicholas Linstead OBE MP Conservative Member of Parliament for Putney since 1942. For political and public services.
- George Donald Alastair MacDougall CBE Chief Adviser, Statistical Branch, Office of the Paymaster General
- William Neil McKie MVO Organist and Master of the Choristers, Westminster Abbey
- Major Sydney Frank Markham MP Conservative Member of Parliament for Buckingham since 1951; for South Nottingham (National), 1935–1945; and for Chatham (Labour), 1929–31. For political and public services.
- Alderman James Marshall JP DL For political and public services in Croydon.
- Frederick Messer CBE JP MP Chairman, Central Health Services Council. Lately Chairman, North West Metropolitan Regional Hospital Board
- Charles Richard Morris, Vice-chancellor, University of Leeds
- John Spencer Muirhead DSO MC TD DL President of the Law Society of Scotland
- Andrew Naesmith CBE JP General Secretary, Amalgamated Weavers' Association
- James Henry Norritt JP DL Lord Mayor of Belfast
- Lieutenant-Colonel Grismond Picton Philipps CVO For political and public services in Carmarthenshire.
- Alderman Theodore Beal Pritchett MC DL For political and public services in Birmingham.
- Stanley Walter Rawson, Director-General of Machine Tools, Ministry of Supply
- Gordon Richards, For services to horse racing in Great Britain.
- Alfred Road CBE Chief Inspector of Taxes, Board of Inland Revenue
- Francis Martin Rouse Walshe OBE FRCP President, Royal Society of Medicine. Consulting Physician to University College Hospital, London
- George Alexander Williamson DL For political and public services in Aberdeenshire.

==== Queensland, Australia ====
- Raymond Douglas Huish, of Queensland, Australia, president of the Queensland Branch of the Returned Services League.

==== South Australia ====
- The Honourable Shirley Williams Jeffries, of the State of South Australia. For public services.
- The Honourable Geoffrey Sandford Reed, Judge of the Supreme Court, State of South Australia

==== Tasmania ====
- Eric Ernest von Bibra OBE Agent-General in London for the State of Tasmania

==== Southern Rhodesia ====
- Andrew Henry Strachan CBE Secretary to the Treasury, Southern Rhodesia

==== Colonies, Protectorates, etc. ====
- Malcolm Palliser Barrow CBE For public services in Nyasaland.
- Ewen MacGregor Field Fergusson JP For public services in Singapore.
- Mehmed Halid Bey. For public services in Cyprus.
- Donald Edward Jackson, Colonial Legal Service, Chief Justice of the Windward and Leeward Islands.
- Edwin Frank McDavid CMG CBE lately Financial Secretary and Treasurer, British Guiana
- Charles MathewCMG QC Colonial Legal Service, Chief Justice, Federation of Malaya
- Roland Welensky CMG JP For public services in Northern Rhodesia.

=== The Most Honourable Order of the Bath ===
==== Knights Grand Cross (GCB) ====
===== Military Division =====
- Admiral Sir George Elvey Creasy KCB CBE DSO MVO
- General Sir Charles Frederic Keightley KCB KBE DSO late Royal Armoured Corps. Colonel, 5th Royal Inniskilling Dragoon Guards
- General Sir Ouvry Lindfield Roberts KCB KBE DSO ADC late Corps of Royal Engineers. Colonel Commandant, Corps of Royal Engineers
- Air Chief Marshal Sir Hugh William Lumsden Saunders KCB KBE MC DFC MM Royal Air Force

===== Civil Division =====
- The Right Honourable Sir Alan Frederick Lascelles GCVO KCB CMG MC Private Secretary to The Queen
- Sir William Strang GCMG KCB MBE Permanent Under-Secretary of State, Foreign Office

==== Knights Commander (KCB) ====
===== Military Division =====
- Vice-Admiral Edmund Walter Anstice CB
- Air Marshal Sir Francis Joseph Fogarty KBE CB DFC AFC Royal Air Force
- Air Marshal Sir Ronald Ivelaw-Chapman KBE CB DFC AFC Royal Air Force
- General (temporary) Sir Eric Garden Robert Mansergh KBE CB MC late Royal Regiment of Artillery. Colonel Commandant, Royal Regiment of Artillery
- Lieutenant-General (temporary) Harold Redman CB CBE late Infantry. Colonel, The King's Own Yorkshire Light Infantry
- Vice-Admiral Peveril Barton Reiby Wallop William-Powlett CB CBE DSO

===== Civil Division =====
- Sir John Douglas Cockcroft CBE Chairman, Defence Research Policy Committee and Scientific Adviser to the Minister of Defence. Director, Atomic Energy Research Establishment
- Commander (S) Sir Dudley Colles KCVO OBE Royal Navy (Retired), Deputy Treasurer to The Queen and Assistant Keeper of the Privy Purse
- Gilbert Nicolson Flemming CB Permanent Secretary, Ministry of Education
- Sir Robert Uchtred Eyre Knox KCVO DSO Ceremonial Officer, H.M. Treasury
- Sir Owen Frederick Morshead KCVO DSO MC DL Librarian to The Queen, Windsor Castle
- Sir John Armitage Stainton KBE QC Counsel to the Chairman of Committees, House of Lords

==== Companions (CB) ====
===== Military Division =====
- Rear-Admiral Geoffrey Barnard CBE DSO
- The Venerable Archdeacon Frank Noel Chamberlain OBE Chaplain of the Fleet
- Major-General Richard Frank Cornwall CBE Royal Marines
- Rear-Admiral Norman Vincent Dickinson DSO DSC
- Rear-Admiral John Willson Musgrave Eaton DSO DSC
- Rear-Admiral Arthur Gordon Voules Hubback CBE
- Rear-Admiral (E) Alexander Davidson McGlashan DSO
- Commodore Arthur Ian Robertson RD RNR
- Rear-Admiral Robert St. Vincent Sherbrooke VC DSO
- Commodore Courtenay Alexander Rives Shillington VRD RNVR
- Brigadier Alexander Meister Astruther OBE late Corps of Royal Engineers
- Brigadier George Rowley Bradshaw CBE late Royal Regiment of Artillery
- Major-General Edwyn Harland Wolstenholme Cobb CBE late Corps of Royal Engineers
- Major-General Joseph Clinton Collins CBE QHS late Royal Army Medical Corps
- Major-General Ralph Cyril Cruddas DSO late Infantry
- Major-General William James Fitzpatrick Eassie CBE DSO late Royal Army Service Corps
- Major-General Frederick Knowles Escritt OBE QHS late Royal Army Medical Corps
- Major-General Cecil Llewellyn Firbank CBE DSO late Infantry
- Major-General Reginald Peregrine Harding DSO late Royal Armoured Corps
- Colonel Leslie Innes Jacques CBE MC late Corps of Royal Engineers
- Major-General James Mansergh Wentworth Martin CBE late Royal Armoured Corps
- The Reverend Canon Victor Joseph Pike CBE QHC Chaplain-General to the Forces (53409), Royal Army Chaplains' Department
- Major-General (temporary) Walter Henry Dennison Ritchie CBE late Royal Army Service Corps
- Major-General Dennis Charles Tarrant Swan CBE late Corps of Royal Engineers
- Brigadier and Chief Paymaster Frederick Christian Williams CBE MC Royal Army Pay Corps
- Air Vice-Marshal George David Harvey CBE DFC Royal Air Force
- Air Vice-Marshal Walter Hugh Merton OBE Royal Air Force
- Air Commodore Adolphus Dan Davies CBE Royal Air Force
- Air Commodore Hector Douglas McGregor CBE DSO Royal Air Force
- Air Commodore John Marson CBE Royal Air Force
- Air Commodore Thomas Bain Prickman CBE Royal Air Force
- Group Captain David John Pryer Lee CBE Royal Air Force
- Group Captain John Gilbert Davis OBE Royal Air Force

===== Civil Division =====
- John Anderson, Deputy Secretary, Scottish Home Department
- Philip Austin Browne, Chief Inspector, Ministry of Education
- Air Vice-Marshal Willett Amalric Bowen Bowen-Buscarlet CBE DFC DL Chairman, East Lancashire Territorial and Auxiliary Forces Association
- Robert Cockburn OBE Scientific Adviser to the Air Ministry
- George Peter Humphreys-Davies, Under-Secretary, H.M. Treasury
- Martin Teall Flett, Under-Secretary, H.M. Treasury
- Isidore Graul OBE Under-Secretary, Ministry of Food
- John French Greenwood, Undersecretary, Central Land Board and War Damage Commission
- John Hastings James, Under-Secretary, Admiralty
- Eric Malcolm Jones CBE Foreign Office
- Ernest Turner Jones OBE Principal Director of Scientific Research (Air), Ministry of Supply
- Evan Bonnor Hugh-Jones MC Chief Engineer, Highways Engineering Staff, Ministry of Transport
- George Herbert Edmeston Parr CBE Comptroller and Auditor-General, Northern Ireland
- John Edward Pater, Under-Secretary, Ministry of Health
- John Alfred Ralph Pimlott, Under-Secretary, Ministry of Materials
- Jack Stafford, Director of Statistics, Board of Trade
- William Thomas, Under-Secretary, Welsh Office, Ministry of Housing and Local Government
- Brigadier Alfred Cedric Cowan Willway CBE TD DL Lately Chairman, Territorial and Auxiliary Forces Association of the County of Surrey
- Norman Egerton Young CMG MC Comptroller-General, National Debt Office

=== Royal Victorian Chain ===
- His Grace Bernard Marmaduke, Duke of Norfolk KG GCVO
- His Grace Henry Hugh Arthur Fitzroy, Duke of Beaufort KG GCVO

=== Royal Victorian Order ===
==== Dames Grand Cross (GCVO) ====
- Her Royal Highness The Princess Margaret CI
- Her Highness Princess Marie Louise CI GBE
- The Right Honourable Mabell Frances Elizabeth, Dowager Countess of Airlie GBE

==== Knights Grand Cross (GCVO) ====
- Field Marshal the Right Honourable Alan Francis, Viscount Alanbrooke KG DSO
- The Most Reverend and Right Honourable Geoffrey Francis Fisher, Lord Archbishop of Canterbury
- The Most Honourable George Horatio Charles, Marquess of Cholmondeley
- Admiral Sir John Hereward Edelsten GCB CBE ADC
- Air Chief Marshal Sir William Elliot KCB KBE DFC ADC Royal Air Force
- The Right Honourable Sir David Patrick Maxwell Fyfe QC MP
- Colonel Sir Dermot McMorrough Kavanagh KCVO
- Major Sir Arthur Horace Penn KCVO MC
- The Right Honourable Lawrence Roger, Earl of Scarbrough KG GCSI GCIE TD
- Sir Harold Richard Scott KCB KBE

==== Dames Commander (DCVO) ====
- The Right Honourable Dorothy Evelyn Augusta, Countess of Halifax CI
- The Right Honourable Patricia, Viscountess Hambleden
- The Right Honourable Cynthia Elinor Beatrix, Countess Spencer OBE

==== Knights Commander (KCVO) ====
- Sir Arnold Edward Trevor Bax
- The Honourable Sir George Rothe Bellew CVO
- Sir John Reginald Hornby Nott-Bower CVO
- Rear-Admiral Sir Arthur Bromley KCMG CVO
- Lieutenant-General Sir Frederick Arthur Montague Browning KBE CB DSO
- Colonel Geoffrey Ronald Codrington CB CMG CVO DSO OBE TD
- Major The Honourable John Spencer Coke CVO
- Sir Rupert de la Bère JP MP
- Cedric Drewe MP
- The Right Honourable David McAdam Eccles MP
- Sir Harold Corti Emmerson
- Major-General Randle Guy Feilden CB CBE
- Major-General Arthur Guy Salisbury-Jones CMG CBE MC
- Sir Percivale Liesching GCMG KCB
- Edgar William Light CMG MVO OBE
- Major Philip Reginald Margetson CVO MC
- Henry Austin Strutt CB CVO

==== Commanders (CVO) ====
- (William) Godfrey Agnew
- Lieutenant-Colonel Francis Cecil Campbell Balfour CIE CBE MC
- Roderick Edward Barclay CMG
- Eric Bedford
- Lieutenant-Colonel Ralph Charles Bingham DSO
- Major Alastair Campbell Blair TD
- John Dykes Bower
- Commander (S) Richard Colville MVO DSC Royal Navy (Retired)
- Roger John Edward Conant MP
- Captain Oliver Payan Dawnay
- Jean Frances, The Honourable Mrs. Andrew Elphinstone
- The Reverend Maurice Frederic Foxell MVO
- Lady Constance Harriet Stuart Milnes-Gaskell
- Lady Margaret Katherine Hay
- Captain Humphrey Clifford Lloyd MVO MC
- John Nigel Loring MRCS LRCP
- Ivison Stephenson Macadam CBE MVO
- Walter Howard Nevill RD
- Osborne Harold Peasgood
- David Bruce Pitblado
- William George Pottinger
- Alderman Charles Pearce Russell JP
- Henry Gray Studholme MP
- Lawrence Edward Tanner MVO
- Burke St. John Trend
- Lieutenant-Colonel The Honourable Osbert Eustace Vesey CMG CBE
- Anthony Richard Wagner
- Lady Victoria Alexandrina Violet Wemyss

==== Fourth Class ====
- James Lawrence Bunting Ansell MRCS LRCP
- The Reverend Prebendary Edward Harold Williams-Ashman
- William Bishop MVO
- Lieutenant-Colonel The Honourable Martin Michael Charles Charteris OBE
- Eugene John Cruft
- Percival Thorne Fielding MVO
- Norman Bishop Hartnell
- Colonel Sir Edward Philip Le Breton
- Major James Rennie Maudslay MBE
- Major Mark Vane Milbank MC
- Oliver Millar
- Major Robert Alfred O'Brien TD
- Lieutenant-Colonel (Director of Music) Meredith Roberts MBE
- Major Charles Murray Kennedy St. Clair (The Master of Sinclair)
- Norman Leslie Swift MVO
- Lieutenant-Colonel John Riddell Bromhead Walker MC
- Major Charles Ernest Walter MBE

==== Fifth Class ====
- Margaret Barron
- Winifred Maud Bateson
- David Vincent Griffiths Buchanan
- Walter Harry Dobson MBE MC MM TD
- William Frederick Fryer
- Edmund Frank Grove
- William John Hepburn MBE
- Robert George Stegmaun Hoare MBE
- Mary Felicity Colquhoun Irvine
- Victoria Florence Laflin
- Margaret McKay MacDonald
- Cyril Arnett Waud
- Allan Green Wickens

=== Order of Merit (OM) ===
- Walter John De La Mare CH

=== The Most Distinguished Order of Saint Michael and Saint George ===
==== Knights Grand Cross (GCMG) ====
- Major-General Sir John Noble Kennedy KCMG KCVO KBE CB MC Governor and Commander-in-Chief of Southern Rhodesia
- Sir John Gilbert Laithwaite KCMG KCIE CSI High Commissioner in Pakistan for Her Majesty's Government in the United Kingdom
- General Sir Gerald Walter Robert Templer KCB KBE CMG DSO ADC High Commissioner, Federation of Malaya

Honorary Knight Grand Cross

- Sultan Abu Bakar Ri'ayatu'd-Din Al-Mu'adzam Shah ibni Al-Marhum Al-Mu'tasim Billah Al-Sultan Abdullah. His Highness the Sultan of Pahang, Federation of Malaya.

==== Knights Commander (KCMG) ====
- Lieutenant-General Sir James Bennett Hance KCIE OBE Medical Adviser and President, Medical Board, Commonwealth Relations Office
- Harold Graham Vincent CB CVO Secretary, Government Hospitality Fund
- Frederick Crawford CMG OBE Governor and Commander-in-Chief, Seychelles
- Robert de Zouche Hall CMG Governor and Commander-in-Chief, Sierra Leone
- Tom Hickinbotham CMG CIE OBE Governor and Commander-in-Chief, Aden
- Stephen Elliot Vyvyan Luke CMG Comptroller for Development and Welfare in the West Indies and British Co-Chairman of the Caribbean Commission
- Douglas Frederick Howard CMG MC Her Majesty's Ambassador Extraordinary and Plenipotentiary in Montevideo
- Frank Kenyon Roberts CMG Deputy Under-Secretary of State, Foreign Office
- Sir James Wilson Robertson KBE Civil Secretary, Sudan Government
- Geoffrey Arnold Wallinger CMG Her Majesty's Ambassador Extraordinary and Plenipotentiary at Bangkok

Honorary Knight Commander

- Sultan Omar Ali Saifuddin CMG ibni Almerhom Sultan Mohamed Jemalulalam, His Highness the Sultan of Brunei.

==== Companions (CMG) ====
- Major Edward Beddington-Behrens MC For services to the Economic League for European Co-operation
- Amos John Cooke, Head of British Food Mission in the Argentine Republic
- James Durward, Deputy Director, Meteorological Office, Air Ministry
- Robert Ernest Hardingham OBE Secretary and Chief Executive, Air Registration Board
- George Macdonald Professor of Tropical Hygiene, University of London, and Director of the Ross Institute of Tropical Hygiene
- Christopher Thomas Saunders, Deputy Director, Central Statistical Office, Cabinet Office
- Matthew Stevenson, Assistant Secretary, H.M. Treasury
- Colonel Granville Walton OBE JP DL RE (Retired), Oversea Commissioner, Boy Scouts Association
- Kenneth Clinton Wheare, Gladstone Professor of Government and Public Administration, University of Oxford
- Roger Boulton Willmot, Senior Trade Commissioner, New Zealand
- George James Armstrong CBE Government Secretary, Basutoland
- The Honourable George Arthur Davenport, Minister of Mines and Transport, and Minister of Education, Southern Rhodesia
- Brigadier Thomas Charles Eastick DSO ED President of the South Australian Branch of the Returned Sailors', Soldiers' and Airmen's League
- Horace Algernon Fraser Rumbold CIE an Assistant Secretary in the Commonwealth Relations Office and recently Deputy High Commissioner for the United Kingdom in the Union of South Africa
- Eric John Carl Stopp MBE Official Secretary to the Governor, State of Tasmania, for many years
- James Thomson OBE MM Deputy High Commissioner for the United Kingdom in Canada
- Arthur Grenfell Clarke, Colonial Administrative Service, Financial Secretary, Hong Kong
- Robert Herbert Keppel-Compton, Colonial Administrative Service, Provincial Commissioner, Nyasaland
- Walter Fleming Coutts MBE Colonial Administrative Service, Administrator, St. Vincent, Windward Islands
- Arthur Norman Galsworthy. Chief Secretary, West African Inter-Territorial Secretariat
- Ronald Ernest German, Colonial Postal Service, Postmaster General, East African Posts and Telegraphs Department, East Africa High Commission
- Noel Hedley Vicars-Harris, Colonial Administrative Service, Member for Lands and Mines, Tanganyika
- Carruthers Melvill Johnston, Colonial Administrative Service, Provincial Commissioner, Kenya
- Charles Ernest Lalbert, Assistant Secretary, Colonial Office
- Patrick Donald Macdonald, Colonial Administrative Service, Colonial Secretary, Leeward Islands
- Thomas Percy Fergus McNeice OBE Colonial Administrative Service, President, City Council, Singapore
- Lionel Armine Mathias, Colonial Administrative Service, Labour Commissioner, Uganda
- John Archibald Mulhall OBE Colonial Administrative Service, Chairman, Public Service Commission, Gold Coast
- Robert Newton, Colonial Administrative Service, Financial Secretary, Jamaica
- Cecil Rex Niven MC Colonial Administrative Service, Senior Resident, Nigeria
- Geoffrey Walter Nye OBE Deputy Agricultural Adviser to the Secretary of State for the Colonies
- David Charles Watherston, Colonial Administrative Service, Chief Secretary, Federation of Malaya
- Edward Henry Windley, Colonial Administrative Service, Provincial Commissioner, Kenya
- Colonel Arthur Edwin Young. For services as Commissioner of Police, Federation of Malaya
- Richard Hugh Sedley Allen, Minister at Her Majesty's Embassy in Buenos Aires
- Harold Beeley CBE Counsellor at Her Majesty's Embassy in Washington
- John Wheeler Wheeler-Bennett OBE Historical Adviser to the Special Historical Section (Captured German Archives) of the Foreign Office Library
- Henry Norman Brain OBE Inspector of Her Majesty's Foreign Service Establishments
- Rolland Alfred Aimé Chaput de Saintonge, Head of the German Information Department, Foreign Office
- Carlton Griffith Davies MC Sudan Agent in London
- Charles Howard Ellis CBE Foreign Office
- William Harpham OBE lately Head of the General Department, Foreign Office
- Charles Hepburn Johnston, Political Director, Office of the United Kingdom High Commissioner, Wahnerheide
- Richard Geoffrey Austin Meade, Her Majesty's Consul-General at Marseilles
- John Bennet Lorimer Munro, lately Chief Administrative Officer, Control Commission for Germany (British Element)
- Cecil Cuthbert Parrott OBE Counsellor at Her Majesty's Embassy in Brussels
- Ivor Thomas Montague Pink, lately Deputy to the Permanent United Kingdom Representative on the Organisation for European Economic Co-operation in Paris
- Archibald David Manisty Ross, Head of the Eastern Department, Foreign Office
- Sir Horace Anthony Claude Rumbold Bt Counsellor at Her Majesty's Embassy in Paris

Honorary Companion

- Alhaji the Honourable Usuman Nagogo CBE Emir of Katsina, Nigeria.

=== The Most Excellent Order of the British Empire ===
Queen Elizabeth II formally presenting Sultan Mohamoud Ali Shirreh his honors (Aden, 1954)

==== Knights Grand Cross (GBE) ====
===== Military Division =====
- Admiral The Honourable Sir Guy Herbrand Edward Russell KCB CBE DSO
- General Sir Frank Ernest Wallace Simpson KCB KBE DSO ADC late Corps of Royal Engineers. Colonel Commandant, Royal Pioneer Corps
- Air Chief Marshal Sir Hugh Pughe Lloyd KCB KBE MC DFC Royal Air Force

===== Civil Division =====
- Sir Alexander Knox Helm KCMG CBE Her Majesty's Ambassador Extraordinary and Plenipotentiary in Ankara
- Sir Hilary Rudolph Robert Blood KCMG Governor and Commander-in-Chief, Mauritius

Honorary Knight Grand Cross

- Abubakar KBE CMG Sultan of Sokoto, Nigeria

==== Dames Commander (DBE) ====
===== Military Division =====
- Brigadier Mary Frances Coulshed CBE TD ADC late Women's Royal Army Corps

===== Civil Division =====
- Lady Helen Violet Bonham Carter, Past President of the Liberal Party Organisation and of the Women's Liberal Federation. For political and public services.
- Lady Helen Cynthia Colville DCVO JP For social work, including services to the welfare of mothers and children.
- Catherine Fulford MBE For political and public services in London.
- Flora MacLeod of MacLeod. For social and public services in Scotland
- Enid Mary Russell Russell-Smith, Under-Secretary, Ministry of Health

==== Knights Commander (KBE) ====
===== Military Division =====
- Vice-Admiral Charles Thomas Mark Pizey CB DSO
- Vice-Admiral Albert Lawrence Poland CB DSO DSC
- Major-General Cecil Norbury Bednall CB OBE MC Royal Army Pay Corps
- Lieutenant-General John Dane Woodall CB OBE MC late Royal Regiment of Artillery
- Air Marshal Robert Owen Jones CB AFC Royal Air Force
- Acting Air Marshal James MacConnell Kilpatrick CB OBE

===== Civil Division =====
- Robert John Graham Boothby MP Unionist Member of Parliament for East Aberdeenshire since 1924. Parliamentary Secretary, Ministry of Food, 1940–41. A delegate to Consultative Assembly of Council of Europe since 1949. For political and public services.
- John Anthony Carroll, Deputy Controller (Research and Development), Admiralty
- Frank Wyndham Hirst CBE Public Trustee
- The Honourable Arthur Jared Palmer Howard CVO JP DL Chairman of the Teaching Hospitals Association
- Alexander Johnston CB Third Secretary, H.M. Treasury
- Dudley Owen Lumley CB OBE Deputy Director General, General Post Office
- Sir Greville Simpson Maginness, Chairman, Churchill Machine Tool Company, Ltd., Manchester
- Major-General William Godwin Michelmore CB DSO MC TD JP DL Chairman, Territorial and Auxiliary Forces Association of the County of Devon
- Sir Charles Johns Mole MVO OBE Director-General of Works, Ministry of Works
- Sir Frederick Ernest Rebbeck JP DL Chairman and Managing Director, Harland and Wolff, Ltd., Belfast
- John Garnett Lomax CMG MBE MC Her Majesty's Ambassador Extraordinary and Plenipotentiary in La Paz
- Norman Stanley Roberts CMG OBE Minister (Commercial) at Her Majesty's Embassy in Tokyo
- Professor Hugh Stott Taylor, Professor of Chemistry and Dean of the Graduate School at Princeton University, United States of America
- Charles Alexander Innes, President, Bengal Chamber of Commerce and Industry, and the Associated Chambers of Commerce of India, 1952–53
- Hugo Frank Marshall CMG Colonial Administrative Service, Lieutenant-Governor, Western Region, Nigeria
- Clement John Pleass CMG Colonial Administrative Service, Lieutenant-Governor, Eastern Region, Nigeria

Honorary Knights Commander

- Dato Onn bin Ja'afar, Member for Home Affairs, Federation of Malaya
- Raja Uda CMG CBE bin Raja Muhammad, Mentri Besar, Selangor, Federation of Malaya
- Mallam Yahaya CMG CBE Emir of Gwandu, Nigeria

==== Commanders (CBE) ====
===== Military Division =====
- Rear-Admiral (E) Robert Cobb OBE
- Jeannie Kathleen Gillanders RRC Matron-in-Chief, Queen Alexandra's Royal Naval Nursing Service
- Colonel Joseph Thomas Hall OBE ADC Royal Marines
- Captain Roy Carlton Harry ADC Royal Navy
- Captain (E) Phillip Daniel Oliver, Royal Navy (Retired)
- Colonel John Markham Phillips, Royal Marines
- Superintendent Nancy Margaret Robertson OBE Women's Royal Naval Service
- Captain Raymond Maurice Trevelyan Taylor, Royal Navy (Retired) (serving with the Indian Navy as Commodore-in-Charge, Bombay)
- Surgeon Captain Samuel Gerald Weldon Royal Navy
- Captain (S) Albert Stanley Wiggett ADC Royal Navy
- Brigadier (temporary) Richard Hugh Barry OBE late Infantry
- Brigadier George Alexander Bond OBE late Royal Army Service Corps
- Brigadier (temporary) Robert Gilbert Trimingham Collins, Employed List I (late The Gloucestershire Regiment)
- Brigadier Brian Daunt DSO late Royal Regiment of Artillery
- Brigadier Francis Charles Widenham Fosbery, late Corps of Royal Engineers
- Major-General Philip Le Marchant Stonhouse Stonhouse-Gostling, late Royal Regiment of Artillery
- Brigadier (formerly Major-General (temporary)) Cecil Hay Gurney OBE late Infantry
- Brigadier (temporary) John Winthrop Hackett DSO MBE MC late Royal Armoured Corps
- Colonel Richard Clarence Halse OBE
- Brigadier Andrew George Heveningham OBE late Royal Army Veterinary Corps
- Colonel (temporary) Godfrey Pennington Hobbs MBE The Royal Northumberland Fusiliers
- Colonel Hilary Leonard Lewis, late Royal Corps of Signals
- Lieutenant-Colonel (formerly Colonel (temporary)) Temple Morris OBE MC Royal Army Ordnance Corps
- Brigadier Henry Albert Potter, late Royal Army Service Corps
- Colonel (acting) Dudley Gethin Bramley Ridout OBE Army Cadet Force
- Brigadier (temporary) John Michael Kane Spurling DSO late Infantry
- Colonel (temporary) Hugh Penry Whitefoord, Royal Regiment of Artillery
- Colonel Thomas Ernest Williams, late Infantry
- Brigadier (temporary) Reginald Edward Holloway MBE late Corps of Royal Engineers, at present on loan to the Government of India
- Colonel Robert Edward Beaumont Long OBE Southern Rhodesia Military Forces
- The Reverend Alan Stanley Giles OBE QHC Royal Air Force
- Air Commodore Frederick Elvy Lipscomb MRCS LRCP QHP Royal Air Force
- Air Commodore Patrick Brunton Lee Potter OBE Royal Air Force
- Acting Air Commodore Wilfrid Ewart Oulton DSO DFC Royal Air Force
- Acting Air Commodore Walter Allan Stagg OBE Royal Air Force
- Group Captain Cyril Edgar Joseph Baines, Royal Air Force
- Group Captain Vyvian George Anthony Bennett, Royal Air Force
- Group Captain Leslie Crocker, Royal Air Force
- Group Captain Edward Mortlock Donaldson DSO AFC Royal Air Force
- Group Captain Noel Challis Hyde, Royal Air Force
- Group Captain Gwilym Laugharne Sloane Griffith-Jones Royal Air Force
- Group Captain Bruce Robinson, Royal Air Force
- Group Captain Richard Stephen Ryan, Royal Air Force
- Group Captain Edward John Herbert Starling, Royal Air Force
- Group Captain John Arthur Charles Stratton OBE Royal Air Force

===== Civil Division =====
- Alfred Agar, Chairman and Managing Director, Davidson and Company, Ltd., Belfast
- John Russell Willis Alexander, Chairman, Westminster Local Employment Committee
- Jeannette Eleanor Altwegg. For services to amateur skating.
- Hugh Arrowsmith, Independent Member of the Raw Cotton Commission
- Alice Martha Bacon MP Labour Member of Parliament for North-East Leeds since 1945. Chairman of the Labour Party, 1950. For political and public services.
- Richard George Baker, Deputy Chairman, North Eastern Division, National Coal Board
- Edmund Bruce Ball, Managing Director, Glenfield and Kennedy, Ltd., Kilmarnock
- John Garnett Banks JP lately City Treasurer, Edinburgh
- William George Barnard FRCP Professor of Pathology, University of London
- Alderman Albert David Bartlett JP For political and public services in Lewisham.
- Frederick Sherbrooke Barton, Principal Director of Electronic Research and Development, Ministry of Supply
- Harry Bateman. For political and public services in Lincolnshire.
- Edward Fetherstonhaugh Batten OBE For political and public services in Devon.
- Joseph Bell, Chief Constable, Manchester City Police Force
- Alderman William James Bennett JP Chairman, Essex County Council. For services during the recent floods in the Eastern Counties.
- MacAlister Bexon, President, The British Furniture Manufacturers' Federated Associations
- Jack Albert Billmeir. For political and public services.
- Henry John Bostock JP For public services in Staffordshire.
- Herbert William Bowden MP Labour Member of Parliament for South Leicester, 1945–50, and for South-West Leicester since 1950. Opposition Deputy Chief Whip since 1951. For political and public services.
- Alexander Doveton John Brennan, Deputy Chief Veterinary Officer, Ministry of Agriculture and Fisheries
- Major James Parry Brown OBE JP For political and public services in South Wales.
- John Norman Brown, Assistant Comptroller, Patent Office and Industrial Property Department, Board of Trade
- Ralph Waldo Cheseore, Deputy Chief Scientific Officer, Admiralty
- David Kenneth Clarke. For political services.
- Donovan Dennett Wilding Cole, Assistant Controller (Production), Atomic Energy Establishment, Risley, Ministry of Supply
- Brian Eliot Common, Chairman, Tyne Improvement Commission. Director, Common Brothers, Ltd.
- Roger Gresham Cooke, Director, The Society of Motor Manufacturers and Traders, Ltd.
- William Oliver Copeman OBE Chairman, Area Provisions and Grocery Committee for the Counties of Norfolk, Suffolk, Huntingdon, Isle of Ely and Bedford. For services during the recent floods in the Eastern Counties
- Robert Armstrong Corscadden, Chief Crown Solicitor, Northern Ireland
- John Cranna. For political services.
- Moss Dancyger OBE Assistant Secretary, Ministry of Pensions
- Clemence Dane (Miss Winifred Ashton), Author
- William Surrey Dane MC Joint Managing Director, Odham's Press, Ltd. For services to King George's Jubilee Trust.
- Lieutenant-Colonel George Darby OBE MC Head of the Commercial Treaties Branch, Colonial Office
- Gwendolen Florence Davies MVO OBE Assistant Private Secretary to the Prime Minister
- Thomas Morris Davies MRCS LRCP Deputy Director General of Medical Services, Ministry of Pensions
- John Donovan, Member, Docks and Inland Waterways Executive
- Arthur Drewry JP President of the Football League
- William Jolly Duncan, Mechan Professor of Aeronautics and Fluid Mechanics, University of Glasgow
- Harvey John Dunkerley, Controller, Midland Region, British Broadcasting Corporation
- Tom Eatough, Assistant Secretary, Export Credits Guarantee Department, Board of Trade
- Herbert Cecil Ralph Edwards, Keeper, Victoria and Albert Museum
- John Arthur Edwards, Deputy Chief Valuer, Board of Inland Revenue
- Willie Evans, Chairman and Managing Director of Chas. H. Challen and Son, Ltd.
- Edward Henry Everson, Command Secretary, Far East Land Forces, War Office
- Arthur Fage, Superintendent, Aerodynamics Division, National Physical Laboratory, Department of Scientific and Industrial Research
- George Daniel Frazer OBE Director of Savings, General Post Office
- Edward Granville Gordon Fost, Alderman, Cambridgeshire County Council
- Edwin Maxwell Fry, Architect and Town Planner
- Caroline Selina Ganley JP Labour Co-operative Member of Parliament for Battersea South, 1945–51. President, London Co-operative Society, 1942–46. For political and public services.
- Hugh Gardner, Assistant Secretary, Ministry of Agriculture and Fisheries
- Walter Frank Gardner, President of the Institute of Actuaries. General Manager of the Prudential Assurance Company, Ltd.
- Neville Archibald Gass MC a Managing Director, Anglo-Iranian Oil Company
- Harry Percy Gee OBE Chairman, Leicester Savings Committee
- Mary Spencer Revell, Lady Graham. For political and public services in the North West
- John Robert Griffin OBE General Secretary, British Legion
- Arthur Guilford, Director of Audit, Exchequer and Audit Department
- Alderman Grierson James Gully JP Chairman, Kent River Board
- Gerald Francis Gurrin, Handwriting expert. For services to the Home Office
- Richard Lloyd Gwilt, President of the Faculty of Actuaries
- Kathleen Mary Halpin OBE Chief Administrator, Regional Department, Women's Voluntary Services
- John Norman Harmer, Assistant Secretary, Ministry of Labour and National Service
- Major Horace Reginald Haslett OBE Chairman, North Ireland War Pensions Committee
- John Hayward, Critic
- Harold Heady, Assistant Secretary, Ministry of Housing and Local Government
- Tom Hebron MVO Registrar and Chief Accountant, Westminster Abbey
- Evelyn Mary Hews, Alderman. For political and public services in Canterbury
- Jessie Emma Higson. For pioneer work in the field of Moral Welfare.
- Major Morton Hiles OBE Secretary-Treasurer, National Federation of Young Farmers' Clubs
- John Alexander Hillman, Assistant Commissioner of Crown Lands
- Edmund Albert Hogan, Registrar-General for Scotland
- Ernest James Henry Holt OBE lately Honorary Secretary, Treasurer, Amateur Athletic Federation
- George Frederick Thomas Hopkins MVO OBE MC Superintendent, Royal Mews, Buckingham Palace
- Herbert Norman Howells, Composer
- John Francis Huntington, Assistant Secretary, Board of Inland Revenue
- James Edgar Hurst JP President, British Cast Iron Research Association
- Ivor Benjamin Hugh James, Professor of Violoncello, Royal College of Music. For services to Chamber Music.
- Lieutenant-Colonel Frank Nevill Jennings MC DL For political and public services in the Isle of Wight.
- Eric Alfred George Johnson, Chief Engineer, Ministry of Agriculture and Fisheries. For services during the recent floods in the Eastern Counties.
- Percy Marshall Johnson, Assistant Secretary, Ministry of Food
- Barry William Thomas Kay, Regional Controller, Midland Region, Board of Trade
- John Donald Kelly JP DL For political and public services in Glasgow.
- Osbert Lancaster, Cartoonist
- Thomas Alan Lane, Director of Expense Accounts, Admiralty
- Francis Walsham Lawe, General Manager, Harrods, Ltd.
- Thomas Lawrie, General Manager, North of Scotland Hydro-Electric Board
- David Lean, Film Director
- Louis le Couteur, Deputy Chief Inspector of Factories, Ministry of Labour and National Service
- Colonel Bruce Hamer Leeson OBE TD Director of British Electrical and Allied Manufacturers Association, Inc
- William Leslie MC TD JP For political and public services in Cornwall.
- Rhys Gerran Lloyd, Secretary, Royal Commission on Awards to Inventors
- Mervyn Lyster Longhurst, Assistant Legal Adviser, Ministry of Education
- Colonel John George Lowther DSO MC TD DL Lately Chairman, Territorial and Auxiliary Forces Association, Counties of Huntingdon and Northampton
- Harry Lyne OBE Area Secretary, YMCA. Southern Command
- Francis Charles McLean MBE Deputy Chief Engineer, British Broadcasting Corporation
- Lieutenant-Colonel Norman MacLeod CMG DSO JP DL Member, National Executive Council of the British Legion, Scotland
- Eva Marion Maguire OBE Head Superintendent, Sandes Soldiers' and Airmen's Homes
- Keith Cranston Mann, Director of Works (Overseas), Air Ministry
- Carl Marshall MBE Assistant Secretary, National Assistance Board
- Archibald Daniel Marston FRCS lately Dean of the Faculty of Anaesthetics, Royal College of Surgeons
- Arnold Ashley Miles FRCP Director, Lister Institute of Preventive Medicine
- Horace William Minshull OBE Head of the Finance Department, Foreign Office
- John Methven Mitchell MBE Lately County Clerk of Fife
- Gilbert Richard Mitchison QC MP Labour Member of Parliament for Kettering since 1945. For political and public services.
- Allan McLeod Mooney, Deputy Director of Electrical Engineering, Admiralty
- Sholto Douglas Morton, Regional Controller, East and West Ridings Region, Ministry of Labour and National Service
- Charles William Moss, Director, Vickers-Armstrongs, Ltd.
- Colonel Robert Fallows Mottershead. For political and public services in Blackburn.
- Edwin Muir, Author, Warden of Newbattle Abbey College, Midlothian
- Alfred Ross Murison JP President, Educational Institute of Scotland
- The Reverend Valentine Paul Nevill, Headmaster, Ampleforth College, York
- Harry Porter Newman, Member of Council, National Association of Corn and Agricultural Merchants
- Henry Nimmo, Chairman, Southern Electricity Board
- Robert Noble, Regional Controller, East and West Ridings Region, Ministry of National Insurance
- Brigadier Harry Naismith Obbard, Chief Administrative Officer, India, Pakistan and South-East Asia District, Imperial War Graves Commission
- Donald Arthur Oliver, Metals Economy Adviser, Ministry of Supply
- John Nelson Panes, Government Secretary and Treasurer, Isle of Man
- Ernest George Peenman, Assistant Secretary, Ministry of Supply
- Nikolaus Bernard Leon Pevsner, Slade Professor of Fine Art, University of Cambridge
- Margaret Evelyn Popham, Principal, Cheltenham Ladies College
- Henry Charles Quincey MBE Commander, Metropolitan Police Force
- Marie Rambert (Mrs. Ashley Dukes), Founder and Directress of the Ballet Rambert
- Joseph Rawlinson, Chief Engineer, London County Council
- Douglas Norman Rayner, Director of Contracts, Ministry of Supply
- Frank RAayns OBE Director of the Norfolk Agricultural Station at Sprowston, Norwich
- Major John George Grey Rea DSO JP Chairman of the Northumberland Agricultural Executive Committee
- Colonel George Ewart Rhodes, Senior Engineering Inspector, Ministry of Housing and Local Government
- Emile Victor Rieu, Editor of the Penguin Classics
- Edward Charles Smith-Ross OBE Foreign Office
- James Eugene George Ruddin, President, National Federation of Cold Storage and Ice Trades
- Edward Lionel Russell, Chief Education Officer, Birmingham
- Arthur James Ryan, Regional Director, London Postal Region, General Post Office
- Robert Lindsay Scarlett OBE Chairman, Scottish Horticultural Advisory Committee
- Aileen Mona Scorrer, Chief Inspector, Children's Department, Home Office
- Lieutenant-Commander Peter Markham Scott MBE DSC RNVR Director, Severn Wildfowl Trust
- William Goodwin Senior OBE Principal Dental Officer, Ministry of Health
- Harold Edward Sheardown, Chairman of Directors, Cook, Welton and Gemmell, Ltd.
- Albert Theodore Shepherd, Deputy Receiver, Metropolitan Police Office
- Reginald Harry Short MVO OBE Clerk Comptroller of the Household of Her late Majesty Queen Mary
- Alastair Sim, Actor
- William Vernor Squire Sinclair, lately Assistant Procurator General
- William Thomas Charles Skyrme TD Secretary of Commissions of the Peace, Lord Chancellor's Office
- Charles Stanley Smallman, Director of Accounts, Ministry of Civil Aviation
- Dorothy Madge Smith OBE Chairman, General Nursing Council for England and Wales, and Matron, Guy's Hospital
- William Henry Smith, Chairman, Welsh National Opera Company, Ltd.
- Reginald Bradbury Southall, Director and General Manager, National Oil Refineries, Ltd.
- Robert Southern, General Secretary, Co-operative Union, Ltd.
- Reginald Rowland Spears MBE lately Deputy Inspector-General, Royal Ulster Constabulary
- Robert Wilkie Stanton, Comptroller of Stamps and Taxes (Scotland), Board of Inland Revenue
- Freya Madeline Stark (Mrs. Stewart Perowne), Writer and Traveller
- Leslie Gordon Knowles Starke, Principal Actuary, Government Actuary's Department
- Alan Stewart MC Head of Division, Ministry of National Insurance
- Gilbert Lines Strachan FRCS For political and public services; and for services as Professor of Obstetrics and Gynaecology in the University of Wales.
- Joseph Summers OBE Chief Test Pilot, Vickers-Armstrongs, Ltd.
- Henry Richard Thomas, Chairman, Welsh Joint Education Committee
- Francis William Thompson, Librarian and Keeper of Collections, Chatsworth
- James Cyril Townsley. For political and public services in Kingston-upon-Hull.
- Matthew Charles Tozer, Assistant Secretary, Ministry of Fuel and Power
- Richard Robertson Trail MC FRCP Medical Director, Papworth and Enham Alamein Village Settlements for the Tuberculous
- Joseph Tumin, Clerk of Assize, Oxford Circuit, Supreme Court of Judicature
- Captain Robert Ernest Tuearsley Tunbridge DSM RD RNR (Retired), lately Master, s.s. "Chusan", Peninsular and Oriental Steam Navigation Company
- Cecil Francis Turner, Chairman and Managing Director, Stewart and Turner, Ltd. Chairman, the Antique Dealers Fair
- Lieutenant-Colonel Charles Arthur Carr Turner OBE TD Chief Executive, Crawley New Town Development Corporation
- Michael Theodore Waterhouse MC Architect
- Michael Milne-Watson, Chairman, North Thames Gas Board
- Geoffrey Fairbank Webb, Secretary, Royal Commission on Historical Monuments (England)
- Denys Roger Hesketh Williams, Managing Director, John Taylors, Ltd., Huddersfield
- Douglas James Willson MBE TD Assistant Solicitor. Board of Customs and Excise
- Lieutenant-Colonel George Robert Stewart Wilson, Royal Engineers, (Retired), Chief Inspecting Officer of Railways, Ministry of Transport
- George Woodcock, Assistant General Secretary, Trades Union Congress
- Arthur Thomas Worboys JP Chairman, London Brick Company, Ltd.
- Hubert Stanley Young TD Deputy Chief Scientific Officer, Ministry of Defence
- Albert Spencer Calvert OBE Her Majesty's Consul-General at Tunis
- William John Castle, Deputy Economic and Financial Adviser, Control Commission for Germany (British Element)
- Sydney Ernest Henry Daw OBE Counsellor (Commercial) at Her Majesty's Embassy in Vienna
- Captain Christmas David Howell OBE Royal Navy (Retired), British Council Representative in Egypt
- Edward Thomas Lambert, Her Majesty's Consul-General at Geneva
- Henry Brockholst Livingston, lately Her Majesty's Envoy Extraordinary and Minister Plenipotentiary at San Jose
- Edwin Patrick Moxey, British subject resident in the Argentine Republic
- Thomas Richard Hornby Owen, Governor, Bahr-el-Ghazal Province, Sudan
- Stanhope Rowton Simpson, Registrar General and Commissioner of Lands, Sudan Government
- George Frederick Walpole, Director of Lands and Surveys under the Government of the Hashemite Kingdom of the Jordan
- Gilbert Brown of the State of South Australia. For services in the development of Anaesthetics.
- Maxwell Gordon Butcher OBE For public services in the State of Tasmania.
- The Reverend Herbert Carter, General Superintendent of the Methodist Church of Southern Rhodesia
- Louis Samuel Glover OBE Member of the European Advisory Council, Bechuanaland Protectorate, and a former Chairman of the Council
- Bevis Royal Graham OBE President of the Associated Chambers of Commerce of Pakistan
- Major Ernest Sirdefield Harston OBE Honorary Secretary, British Empire Service League
- Air Vice-Marshal Malcolm Henderson CB CIE DSO RAF (Retired), Director-General of the Over-Seas League
- Richard Henry Maclure Lea, General Manager of the Electricity Trust, State of South Australia
- Albert Millin OBE JP Member of the European Advisory Council of Swaziland since 1921
- Charles Kingsley Murphy JP Clerk of the House of Assembly, and Librarian to Parliament, State of Tasmania
- Ivan Herbert Pierce JP a Member of the European Advisory Council of Swaziland since 1921
- Thomas John Rooney, Chairman of the Land and Agriculture Bank, Southern Rhodesia
- Robert Walker OBE a prominent tea planter in South India. For services to the United Kingdom community.
- John Philip Attenborough OBE Colonial Education Service, Director of Education, Tanganyika
- Andrew Gordon Beattie, lately Inspector-General of Agriculture, Nigeria
- Reginald Laing Brooks, Colonial Forest Service, Permanent Secretary to the Ministry of Agriculture and Natural Resources, Gold Coast
- George Cabral. For public services in Trinidad.
- Alan Taylor Howell Colonial Medical Service, Director of Medical Services, Tanganyika
- Kenneth Charles Jacobs OBE Financial Secretary, Sierra Leone
- Percival Henry Jennings, Colonial Audit Service, Director of Audit, Hong Kong
- Rajabali Jumabhoy JP For public services in Singapore.
- The Right Reverend Leonard Stanley Kempthorne, Bishop in Polynesia, Fiji
- Amar Nath Maini OBE For public services in Uganda.
- Andre Lawrence Nairac. For public services in Mauritius.
- Ralph Arthur Nicholson, Colonial Administrative Service, Economic Secretary, Northern Rhodesia
- George William Kelly Roberts. For public services in the Bahamas.
- Peter George Russo OBE JP For public services in Gibraltar.
- Philip Manderson Sherlock, Vice Principal and Director of Extra-Mural Studies, University College of the West Indies
- Alexander Skinner, Director of Marine, Nigeria
- Robert de Stapeldon Stapledon OBE Colonial Administrative Service, Economic Secretary, East Africa High Commission
- Nathaniel Henry Peniston Vesey. For public services in Bermuda.
- Douglas Tremayne Waring. For public services in the Federation of Malaya.
- Lionel Digby Whitfield, Colonial Education Service, Director of Education, Federation of Malaya

Honorary Commanders

- Dato Syed Abdul Kadir bin Mohamed bin Yahya, Mentri Besar, Johore, Federation of Malaya
- Vadake Menokil Narayana Menon OBE For public services in the Federation of Malaya.
- Mallam Ahmadu, Sardauna of Sokoto, Northern Regional Minister of Works, Nigeria

==== Officers (OBE) ====
===== Military Division =====
- Lieutenant-Commander Charles Edward Stuart Basil St. George Beal, Royal Navy
- Lieutenant-Colonel Edward Ashley Brown, Royal Marines
- Commander (L) Albert Edward Chiverton, Royal Navy
- Commander (E) Peter Laurence Cloete, Royal Navy
- Lieutenant-Commander Godfrey Vincent Corbett, Royal Navy
- Commander Charles Edward Eckersley-Maslin, Royal Navy
- The Reverend Edward George Dalton Fawkes, Chaplain, Royal Navy
- Commander (E) John Noel Fisher Haigh, Royal Navy (Retired)
- Commander (E) Trevor Sydney Hayes DSC Royal Navy (Retired)
- Commander (S) Leonard Alphonso Jeffery, Royal Navy
- Instructor Commander Harold John Jessup, Royal Navy
- Lieutenant-Colonel Martin Price DSO Royal Marines
- Surgeon Commander John Mansel Reese MRCS LRCP Royal Navy
- Commander George Frederick Rutter RD RNR (Retired), Captain R.F.A. Service
- Commander Patrick Astor Trier, Royal Navy (Retired)
- Commander (S) John Douglas Trythall, Royal Navy
- Lieutenant-Colonel (temporary) James Harry Allason, 3rd Carabiniers (Prince of Wales's Dragoon Guards), Royal Armoured Corps
- Major Alan Edward Bray MC Royal Regiment of Artillery
- Lieutenant-Colonel (T.O.T.) Albert Henry Britton, Royal Corps of Signals
- Lieutenant-Colonel (temporary) Thomas Richard Broughton, The Royal Scots (The Royal Regiment)
- Major Ian Rupert Burrows MBE The Middlesex Regiment (Duke of Cambridge's Own)
- Lieutenant-Colonel (temporary) Cedric George Buttenshaw DSO MBE Royal Regiment of Artillery
- Lieutenant-Colonel (now Colonel) Archibald Inglis Crawford MC TD Royal Regiment of Artillery, Territorial Army
- Lieutenant-Colonel Gordon John Cruddas, The Royal Northumberland Fusiliers, Territorial Army (now T.A.R.O.)
- Brevet Lieutenant-Colonel Charles Julius Deedes MC The King's Own Yorkshire Light Infantry
- Lieutenant-Colonel Francis Vernon Denton TD The King's Regiment (Liverpool), Territorial Army
- Lieutenant-Colonel (temporary) Anthony Henry George Dobson MC Corps of Royal Engineers
- Lieutenant-Colonel Cecil Bryan Gibbons, Corps of Royal Electrical and Mechanical Engineers
- Lieutenant-Colonel (temporary) Henry Pryce Gillespie, The South Wales Borderers
- Lieutenant-Colonel Charles Henry Pepys Harington DSO MC The Cheshire Regiment
- Lieutenant-Colonel Pierse Francis Hayes, Corps of Royal Engineers
- Lieutenant-Colonel Ronald Edwin Holden DSO MC Westminster Dragoons (2nd County of London Yeomanry), Royal Armoured Corps, Territorial Army
- Lieutenant-Colonel (Quartermaster) Walter George Holden, Employed List II (late Royal Army Service Corps)
- Lieutenant-Colonel Whitaker Austin Holmes MC TD The East Yorkshire Regiment (The Duke of York's Own), Territorial Army
- Lieutenant-Colonel (temporary) David Leonard Powell-Jones MBE 6th Gurkha Rifles
- Major (Quartermaster) James Notman Keil MBE The Seaforth Highlanders (Ross-shire Buffs, The Duke of Albany's)
- Lieutenant-Colonel (temporary) Herbert Alfred Temple Jarrett-Kerr, Corps of Royal Engineers
- The Reverend Canon John Robertson Hardie Knox, Chaplain to the Forces, Second Class (temporary), Royal Army Chaplains' Department
- Lieutenant-Colonel Samuel John Lamplugh, Employed List I (late Royal Regiment of Artillery)
- Lieutenant-Colonel (Director of Music) Albert Lemoine, The Life Guards
- Lieutenant-Colonel (temporary) Godfrey Lerwill MC The Middlesex Regiment (Duke of Cambridge's Own)
- Lieutenant-Colonel (temporary) John Palmer Lloyd DSO TD Royal Regiment of Artillery (now T.A.R.O.)
- Brevet Lieutenant-Colonel Ronald Clarence Macdonald DSO The Royal Warwickshire Regiment
- Lieutenant-Colonel (temporary) Sir Edward William St. Lo Malet, Bt., 8th King's Royal Irish Hussars, Royal Armoured Corps
- Lieutenant-Colonel (O.E.O.) Gerald John Mitchell MBE Royal Army Ordnance Corps
- Brevet Lieutenant-Colonel Charles Harold Arthur Olivier, Royal Regiment of Artillery
- Lieutenant-Colonel John Reginald Henry Orr, Employed List I (late The Royal Welch Fusiliers)
- Lieutenant-Colonel Edgar Claude Manning Palmer TD Royal Regiment of Artillery, Territorial Army (now T.A.R.O.)
- Lieutenant-Colonel Alastair Stevenson Pearson DSO MC TD DL The Parachute Regiment, Territorial Army
- Lieutenant-Colonel Charles William Provis TD DL Royal Regiment of Artillery, Territorial Army
- Lieutenant-Colonel (temporary) Albert Harry Reading, Corps of Royal Engineers
- Lieutenant-Colonel Percy Fergus Ivo Reid, Irish Guards
- Lieutenant-Colonel (acting) Alexander Rennie, Army Cadet Force
- Lieutenant-Colonel Norman William Schenke, Corps of Royal Electrical and Mechanical Engineers
- Lieutenant-Colonel (local) Richard Christopher Sharples MC Welsh Guards
- Lieutenant-Colonel (acting) John Cleave Simmons TD Combined Cadet Force
- Brevet Lieutenant-Colonel William Alexander Stevenson DSO The Queen's Own Cameron Highlanders
- Lieutenant-Colonel Giles Symonds MC TD The Dorset Regiment, Territorial Army
- Lieutenant-Colonel Arthur William Thompson MC TD The Border Regiment, Territorial Army (now T.A.R.O.)
- Honorary Lieutenant-Colonel Leslie Nelson Turner MBE TD Combined Cadet Force (now retired)
- Lieutenant-Colonel Leslie James Walker MBE
- Lieutenant-Colonel (temporary) Noel Montague Harold Wall MC 7th Queen's Own Hussars, Royal Armoured Corps
- Lieutenant-Colonel Henry de Grey Warter TD Royal Regiment of Artillery, Territorial Army
- Lieutenant-Colonel Alfred Hubert Graham Wathen, The Duke of Wellington's Regiment (West Riding)
- Lieutenant-Colonel (temporary) George Witheridge DSO Royal Tank Regiment, Royal Armoured Corps
- Lieutenant-Colonel (temporary) Desmond Patrick O'Brien, Corps of Royal Engineers, at present on loan to the Government of India
- Lieutenant-Colonel George Edward Litchfield Rule, Rhodesian African Rifles, Southern Rhodesia Military Forces
- Major David Burnett MBE The South Lancashire Regiment (The Prince of Wales's Volunteers), attached The Malay Regiment
- Lieutenant-Colonel Alexander Thomson Edgar MBE ED Federation of Malaya Volunteer Force
- Colonel Edward Ward Seymour Jacklin AFC Southern Rhodesia Air Force
- Acting Group Captain Ronald Alan Campbell Barclay AFC Royal Air Force
- The Reverend Gerald William Norris Groves, Royal Air Force
- Wing Commander Ronald Clarke Cobbe DSO Royal Air Force
- Wing Commander Albert Edward Davies, Royal Air Force
- Wing Commander Gordon Hugh Everitt DSO DFC Royal Air Force
- Wing Commander Robert Thomas Frogley DFC Royal Air Force
- Wing Commander James Edward Holliwell MBE Royal Air Force
- Wing Commander Edward Arthur Jackson, Royal Air Force
- Wing Commander David Richard Spencer Bevan-John, Royal Air Force
- Wing Commander Norman Alfred Martin, Royal Air Force Regiment
- Wing Commander William Gordon Oldbury DFC Royal Air Force
- Wing Commander Alan Richardson, Royal Air Force
- Wing Commander Denis Dart Rogers, Royal Air Force
- Wing Commander Walter Smith, Royal Air Force
- Wing Commander Gerald Tate DFC Royal Air Force
- Wing Commander Charles Douglas Tomalin DFC AFC Royal Air Force
- Acting Wing Commander Maurice Swainston Anthony, Royal Auxiliary Air Force
- Squadron Leader Ian Robert Blair, Royal Air Force
- Squadron Leader George Dennithorne Castle, Royal Air Force
- Squadron Leader Frederick Ellison AFC Royal Air Force
- Squadron Leader Joseph Edward Lewis, Royal Air Force
- Squadron Leader Leslie Arthur Popham, Royal Air Force
- Squadron Leader Arthur Weaver, Royal Air Force
- Acting Squadron Leader Eric Robinson, Royal Air Force
- Rab Khaila Zaia Gewergis MBE Royal Air Force Levies, Iraq

===== Civil Division =====
- Frederick William Abraham, Motive Power Superintendent (London Midland Region), Railway Executive
- Captain Marmaduke Johnathan Roland Alderson, Fleet Manager, Comets. British Overseas Airways Corporation
- Thomas Allsop JP, Chairman, Derbyshire Executive Council, National Health Service
- Frederick Victor Ames, Principal, Board of Trade
- Alexander Anderson, Chairman, Wishaw and District Employment Committee
- George Rowland Armstrong, Chief Engineer, M.V. Esso Bedford, Esso Transportation Company, Ltd.
- Sydney George Bailey MBE, Secretary, Cake and Biscuit Alliance, Ltd.
- John Gibb Ballingall, Principal Scientific Officer, Torpedo Experimental Establishment, Greenock
- Andrew Lindsay Barclay MBE, Deputy Controller of Supplies, Ministry of Works
- Brian Basil Philip Barker, Chief Information Officer, Ministry of Works
- John Barker, Member of the Council of the National Farmers' Union
- Joanna Cecilia Barnard, Regional Administrator, South Eastern Region, Women's Voluntary Services
- Albert Edward Barton, Principal Accountant, Mersey Docks and Harbour Board
- Harold Thomas William Bateman, Waterguard Superintendent, Glasgow, Board of Customs and Excise
- Charles Henry Bates, Grade 2 Officer, North Midlands Region, Ministry of Labour and National Service
- Wing Commander Roland Prosper Beamont DSO DFC, Chief Test Pilot, English Electric Company, Ltd.
- Edward Benjamin Bein, Chief Executive Officer, Ministry of National Insurance
- Alfred Charles Best, Principal Scientific Officer, Meteorological Office, Air Ministry
- Harold Hoghton Best MM, Principal, War Office
- Robert Beveridge, Chief Examiner, Estate Duty Office (Scotland), Board of Inland Revenue
- Charles Wright Blasdale, Senior Inspector of Taxes, Board of Inland Revenue
- James Alexander Vazeille Boddy JP, Chairman, Midland Area Council, British Legion
- Fred Booth, Chairman and Managing Director, The Heckmondwike Flock Company, Ltd., Batley, Yorkshire
- William Thomas Boston, Swordbearer, Corporation of London
- Charles Anthony Boucher, Medical Officer, Ministry of Health
- Andrew John Bowron, Managing Director, F.N.F., Ltd. Textile Engineers, Burton-on-Trent
- Stanley Herbert Bright, Chief Executive Officer, Admiralty
- Alderman Richard Browell JP, Vice-Chairman, Newburn Urban District Council
- Colonel Alexander Denis Burnett-Brown MC TD, Secretary, Royal National Lifeboat Institution
- Alfred Willoughby Hope Brown, Deputy Chief Inspector (Planning), Ministry of Housing and Local Government
- George Chadwin Brown MBE, Chief Executive Officer, Ministry of Defence
- William Brown JP Chairman, Huntingdonshire County Council
- William Brown, Chairman, Wigan, Chorley and District War Pensions Committee
- Harry James Browning, Deputy Chief Investigation Officer, Board of Customs and Excise
- Robert Bruce, County Agricultural Officer, Ministry of Agriculture and Fisheries
- William Buckie, Technical Manager, Swan, Hunter and Wigham Richardson, Ltd., Wallsend-on-Tyne
- John Gilby Bullen, General Manager, Highland Reduction Works, British Aluminium Company, Ltd.
- Lieutenant-Colonel Frederick David Harold Burcher. For political and public services in Kidderminster.
- Charles Frederick Burden, Deputy Director, Aeronautical Inspection Services, Air Ministry
- Harry Burdge JP, For political and public services in Belfast.
- Donald Henry Burgess Deputy Trade Director, Ministry of Food
- Arthur Ulick Burke. For public services in Belfast.
- Major Cecil Burnham MS FRCS, lately Commandant, Star and Garter Home for Disabled Soldiers, Sailors and Airmen, Richmond
- Eleanor Mary Beresford Butler MBE, Vice-Chairman, Oxford Savings Committee
- William John Hughes Butterfield MRCP, Member of the Scientific Staff, Medical Research Council
- The Reverend Lewis Legertwood Legg Cameron MBE, Director, Church of Scotland Committee on Social Service
- Charles Stewart Campbell, Director of Sulphur and Sulphuric Acid Supplies, Ministry of Materials
- Sidney Ronald Campion, Principal Information Officer, General Post Office
- Harold James Cartwright, Principal Accountant, Ministry of Works
- Eleanor Rosalie Lancashire Cave. For political and public services in Bristol.
- Charles Chambers. Chief Engineer, Fighter Command, Royal Air Force
- Walter William Chapman TD, Architect, Ministry of Education
- Richard Chatterton, Chief Executive Officer, Home Office
- Philip Boughton Chatwin, Archaeologist. For services to the Ministry of Works.
- John Clancy, Managing Director, J.C. Hotels, Ltd.
- Alexander Morton Clark, Chairman, Scottish Accident Prevention Council
- Andrew Lewis Cochrane, Chairman and Managing Director. Cochrane and Sons, Ltd., Selby
- George Frederick Congdon, Town Clerk, Harwich. For services during the recent floods in the Eastern Counties.
- Reginald Thomas Cook, Principal Inspector, Board of Customs and Excise
- Leslie Charles Coombes MBE, Constructor, H.M. Dockyard, Chatham. For services during the recent floods in the Eastern Counties.
- Lieutenant-Colonel John Morton Vernon Cotterell, Secretary, Territorial and Auxiliary Forces Association, County of Chester
- Alfred Henry Coulter JP, For political services in Northern Ireland
- Robert Cousland, Shipbuilding Manager, J. Samuel White and Company, Ltd., Cowes
- Herbert Maurice Cowell, Assistant Regional Controller, Eastern Region, Ministry of National Insurance
- Thomas Alfred Methuen Croucher, Principal, Ministry of Agriculture and Fisheries. For services during the recent floods in the Eastern Counties.
- Hugh John Curnow, Assistant Director, Aircraft Production Supplies (Materials), Ministry of Supply
- Katharine Hannay Barrs Da Vies. Independent Member of Wages Councils
- William Robert Davies MM, Secretary of the Liberal Party Organisation. For political services.
- John Edward Davis, Chief Technical Officer, South Eastern Gas Board
- Charles Vivian Dawe, Principal Agricultural Economist, University of Bristol
- Seymour Joly De Lotbiniere, Head of Television Outside Broadcasting, British; Broadcasting Corporation
- Daniel Joseph Devlin, Senior Inspector of Taxes, Board of Inland Revenue
- Frank Dickinson. For political and public services in Yorkshire.
- Henry Dinsmore MC, Director of Education, County Down
- Ernest Harvey Doubleday, County Planning Officer, Hertfordshire County Council
- Irene Dowling. For political and public services in London.
- William Henry Nassau Downer, General Secretary, Council for the Encouragement of Music and the Arts (Northern Ireland)
- Frederick Doy, Principal, Board of Trade
- Harry Earnshaw, General Secretary, Amalgamated Association of Beamers, Twisters and Drawers
- Richard Victor Eaton, Superintendent, Royal Naval Propellant Factory, Caerwent, Monmouthshire
- John Charles Newport Eppstein, Director, British Society For International Understanding
- Ida Mary Eugster JP, Regional Administrator, Eastern Region, Women's Voluntary Services
- Raymond Ogier Falla, President States of Guernsey Committee for Horticulture
- Darrell Fancourt (Darrell Louis Fancourt Leverson), Opera singer, D'Oyly Carte Opera Company
- Donald Gordon Farrow, Chief Education Officer, Great Yarmouth. For services during the recent floods in the Eastern Counties.
- Frank Charles Fenton, Chief Commercial Officer, London Electricity Board
- William Ferguson JP, For political services in North Down.
- Horace Philip Finch, Aerodrome Commandant, Grade I. Ministry of Civil Aviation
- Ernest Fleming, lately Chief Executive Officer, Agricultural Research Council
- Percy Howard Ford, lately Works Manager, Guest, Keen and Nettlefolds, Ltd., Birmingham
- Norman William Frederick Fowler, Assistant Chief Constable, Kent County Constabulary. For services during the recent floods in the Eastern Counties.
- Richard Henry French MC, Assistant to the Master in Lunacy, Supreme Court of Judicature
- Albert James Galpest MVO, Assistant Secretary, Lord Chamberlain's Office
- Herbert Washington Gamble, lately President of the Pharmaceutical Society of Northern Ireland
- Frederick Augustus Gear, Assistant Director, Technical and Personnel Administration, Ministry of Supply
- Jane Dorothy Ross Gibson, Matron, Newcastle upon Tyne General Hospital
- Captain Frank Newman Gilbey. For services to the Master of the Horse
- Charles Wilfrid Scorr-Giles, Secretary, Institution of Municipal Engineers
- Mary Gaskell Gillick, Sculptor and Medal Artist
- Ernest Edward Gingell, Principal Collector of Taxes, Board of Inland Revenue
- John Charles Glover, Deputy Director, Oils and Fats Division, Ministry of Food
- Cyril James Goad. Chief Officer, Gloucestershire Fire Brigade
- John Fletcher Go Am An, Senior Marketing Officer, Ministry of Agriculture and Fisheries
- Strathearn Gordon, Librarian, House of Commons
- James Thompson Graham, Employer Vice-Chairman, North Midland Regional Board for Industry
- Kenneth John Grant , Medical Officer of Health, Great Yarmouth. For services during the recent floods in the Eastern Counties.
- Thomas Forgie Gray, Secretary, Bradford Chamber of Commerce
- William Ewart Greenhalgh, Chief Officer, Coventry Fire Brigade.
- Lieutenant-Colonel Ronald Berry Greenwood, Assistant Chief Constable, Lincolnshire County Constabulary. For services during the recent floods in the Eastern Counties.
- Sydney Gordon Griffin, Principal, Ministry of Transport
- Captain Hugh Peary Griffiths, Assistant Commissioner, City of London Police Force
- Francis Walter Grimes, Grade 2 Officer, Midlands Region, Ministry of Labour and National Service
- Harold Charlesworth Grimshaw, Principal Scientific Officer, Safety in Mines Research Establishment, Ministry of Fuel and Power
- William Herbert Grinsted MBE, Chief Engineer, Siemens Brothers and Company, Ltd., Woolwich
- Cecil Brodrick Guthrie. For services to the Home Office.
- Major Eben Stuart Burt Hamilton MC FRCSE, Commissioner, Duke of Lancaster's District, St. John Ambulance Brigade
- Isa Hamilton, lately Superintendent, Queen's Institute of District Nursing
- John Ireland Hamilton, Principal Officer, Ministry of Labour and National Insurance, Northern Ireland
- Henry Frank Hancock, Assistant Shipping Attache, H.M. Embassy in Washington
- Kathleen Irene Hancock, Personal Private Secretary to the Minister of Fuel and Power
- Louis Arthur Hanuy, Assistant Regional Controller, South Western Region, Ministry of National Insurance
- Honoria Eugenie Harford, lately General Secretary, National Association of Girls' Clubs and Mixed Clubs
- Frederick Louis Harris JP, Extramural Tutor, University College of the South-West
- Natalie Muriel Harris, Foreign Office
- James More Wood Harvey, Deputy City Commandant, Ulster Special Constabulary, Londonderry
- Robert William Harvey, Clerk to the Felixstowe Urban District Council. For services during the recent floods in the Eastern Counties.
- George Horace Hatherill MBE, Deputy Commander, Metropolitan Police Force
- Edwin Haward, lately Secretary, the India, Pakistan and Burma Association
- John Ganly Heaslip, Senior Engineer, South Eastern Divisional Road Engineer's Office, Ministry of Transport
- Cedric Hedderwick, Managing Director, Somerset Accredited Breeders Hatchery, Ltd.
- William Heron, Staff Inspector for Further Education, Ministry of Education, Northern Ireland
- James Herbert Hewitt, Principal, Ministry of Labour and National Service
- Anthony Ewart Ledger Hill, Chairman, Hampshire And Isle of Wight Association of Boys' Clubs
- John Hill, Procurator Fiscal of Renfrewshire, Paisley
- Edwin Russell Hooper, Assistant Secretary, Metropolitan Police Office
- George Henry Augustus Hughes, Director, London Master Builders' Association
- Frederick Arthur Hunt, Chief Executive Officer, Board of Trade
- James Hyman, Principal, H.M. Treasury
- Daniel Durnford Ivall, Assistant Chief Officer, Middlesex Fire Brigade
- William Hart MacIndoe Jackson, Employers' Secretary, National Joint Industrial Council for the Electric Cable Slaking Industry
- Robert Ian Johnson, Director of Canning, Ministry of Food
- John Lees-Jones JP, Chairman, National Association of Discharged Prisoners Aid Societies
- Joseph Jones, Labour Director, West Midlands Division, National Coal Board
- Kenneth Latimer Jones, Chairman, Luton Savings Council
- Phyllis Eveline Jones, Personal Assistant to the Secretary of the Parliamentary Labour Party. For political services.
- Major Thomas Ifpr Jones DL, For political and public services in Wales.
- Frederick Joseph Kemp, Honorary Secretary, Association of Collecting Friendly Societies
- The Right Honourable Edith, Viscountess Kemsley, Chairman, Mauritius Bureau
- Wilfred Kershaw, Honorary Secretary of the Textile Institute
- Evelyn Mary Killby. For political services.
- Stanley Edwin King, Chief Executive Officer, Board of Trade
- Harold James Kotch, County Welfare Officer, Warwickshire
- John Privett Langston, Director, Films Division, Central Office of Information
- Frank Harold Lawrence JP, Mayor of Chatham
- Lieutenant-Colonel Reginald Ledingham MC TD, For political services.
- Walter Kelly Wallace Lees, Headmaster, Thornly Park Approved School, Paisley
- Philip Le Feuvre, Senator of the States of Jersey
- Cynthia Combermere Legh JP, For political and public services in Cheshire.
- Thomas James Lester, Chief Executive Officer, Office of the Commissioners of Crown Lands
- Arthur Denis Carrington Le Sueur, Forestry Consultant
- The Reverend Isaac Levy, Senior Jewish Chaplain to H.M. Forces
- Alderman John Henry Lewis MBE JP, For services to the Ministry of Fuel and Power.
- Richard Vincent Lewis, Clerk to the Mablethorpe and Sutton Urban District Council. For services during the recent floods in the Eastern Counties.
- Alexander Logan, Technical Manager, Marine Administration, Anglo-Saxon Petroleum Company, Ltd.
- Janet Isabella Low. For political and public services in Fife.
- Geoffrey Charles Lowry TD, Clerk to the Governors, Imperial College of Science and Technology, University of London
- Anne Hutcheson McAllister, Principal Lecturer, Jordanhill Training College, Glasgow
- James Sanderson McGregor , Medical Superintendent, Saxondale (Mental) Hospital, Radcliffe-on-Trent, Nottinghamshire
- Enid Devoge McLeod MBE, Deputy Controller, European Division, British Council
- James Carnegie McPetrie, Assistant Legal Adviser, Colonial Office
- George Menzie McTurk JP, Chairman, Ayrshire Joint Probation Committee
- Philip Vibert Mauger JP, Chairman, Richmond Local Employment Committee
- Clifford Edmund Mee, Assistant Chief Architect, Ministry of Works
- George Herbert Mysl Miles, Chairman of the Executive Committee. Association of British Aero Clubs and Centres
- Alan Gordon Mitchell, Commandant, Edinburgh Foot Special Constabulary
- Anstace Helen Moore JP, Headmistress, Faringdon County Grammar School for Girls, Berkshire
- Howard Stanley Morrison, Deputy Principal Executive Officer, War Office
- Robert Howell Murphy, Employers' Representative, National Arbitration Tribunal (Northern Ireland)
- Lieutenant-Colonel Clive Needell MC TD, Assistant Secretary (Investments), Church Commissioners
- John Cuthbert Needham, Chairman, Evershed and Vignoles, Ltd., London
- James Lawrie Neill, Grade 2 Officer, Nottingham, Ministry of Labour and National Service
- Alfred Edward Nelson, Chief Engineer, S.S. Kenya, British India Steam Navigation Company, Ltd.
- Harold Aubrey Parker, Principal, Board of Customs and Excise
- John Abel Parkes JP, For public services in Staffordshire.
- Edward Lewis Ellman Pawley, Head of Engineering Services Group, British Broadcasting Corporation
- Douglas Henry Peacock, Member, Manchester Savings Committee
- Stuart Philip Pepin. For public services in Jersey.
- Leonard Lawrence Alfred Wheatley-Perry, Senior District Manager, Navy, Army and Air Force Institutes, Malaya
- Lieutenant-Colonel John Cecil Petherick MC. For political and public services in Kent.
- Major Francis Ashley Phillips DSO JP, lately Clerk to the Wye Board of Conservators
- William Roy Piggott, Principal Scientific Officer, Radio Research Station, Department of Scientific and Industrial Research
- Hubert Percival Lancaster Pitman DL, Chairman, Northern London War Pensions Committee
- John Pollock, Chief Executive Officer, Ministry of Pensions
- Harry Royston Portman MBE, Principal, Foreign Office
- Horace Clifford Potter, Principal, H.M. Treasury
- Henry Ray Powell MBE, Secretary, Capital Issues Committee
- Christopher Jonathan Pridmore, Administration Officer, Maintenance Command, Royal Air Force
- Captain James Harrison Quick, Principal Examiner of Masters and Mates, Mercantile Marine, Ministry of Transport
- Gordon George Ramsay, Sheriff Clerk of Lanarkshire
- George Rankine MC , General Practitioner, Dundee
- Alfred William Rathbone, Assistant Controller, Supplies Department, General Post Office
- Captain Percy Reay MBE MC, Chairman, Lyme Green Settlement for Paraplegics, Macclesfield
- David Morgan Rees JP, Member, Welsh Agricultural Land Sub-Commission
- Robert Charles Reginald Richards, Chief Executive Officer, Welsh Board of Health
- Captain Arthur Victor Richardson, lately Master, S.S. Gothic, Shaw Savill and Albion Company, Ltd.
- The Right Honourable Ursula Ridley, Viscountess Ridley. For public services in Northumberland.
- Archibald Colin Campbell Robertson JP, General Secretary, Oldham Provincial Card Blowing and Ringframe Operatives Association
- Charles Robins, Member, Central Management Committee, National Association of United Kingdom Oil and Oilseed Brokers, Ltd.
- John Arthur Rodwell, Chairman, Durham and Chester-le-Street Local Employment Committee
- Alfred Denys Strickland Rogers TD, For political and public services in Newcastle upon Tyne.
- Philip Docwra Rogers, lately Deputy Assistant Secretary and Clerk to the Council of the Royal Society
- John Rose, Senior Lands Officer, Department of Agriculture for Scotland
- Archibald Hugh Houstoun Ross, Conservator, Forestry Commission
- Dudley Spencer Reeve Ryder, Principal, Admiralty
- Rita Nimmo Sabey. For political and public services in Huntingdonshire.
- Frederick Claude Savage, First Secretary at H.M. Embassy in Dublin
- Bertram Cyril Scott, Chief Executive Officer, Ministry of Pensions, Ministry of Pensions Representative in Australia and New Zealand
- John Thomas Scoulding, Member, Appellate Tribunal under the National Service Acts
- George William Shummacher, Principal Officer, Ministry of Finance, Northern Ireland
- John Simpson, Deputy Secretary to the Commissioners of Northern Lighthouses
- Robert James Simpson, Chief Executive Officer, Civil Service Commission
- Geoffrey Roy Sisson, Head of Department of Mathematics, Royal Military Academy, Sandhurst
- Nelson Sizer MBE MC, Assistant Chief Engineer, Ministry of Works
- Thomas Small, Plant Pathologist to the States of Jersey
- Harold James Smith, Grade 2 Officer, London and South Eastern Region, Ministry of Labour and National Service
- Captain John Joseph Smith, Commodore Captain, Elder Dempster Lines, Ltd.
- Louis Victor Smith MC, For political and public services in Berkshire.
- William Smith BEM Chief Officer, Stoke-on-Trent Fire Brigade
- Robert Henry Smyth, Principal, Ministry of Food
- Edward Lionel Snell, Chief Engineer, Essex River Board. For services during the recent floods in the Eastern Counties.
- Edward Leslie Spencer DSO, Civil Assistant, War Office
- Claude Meyer Spielman MC, Managing Director, Whessoe, Ltd., Darlington
- Constance Spry, Adviser on Floral Decoration
- Leonard Jacques Stein. For political and public services.
- Harold Stevens MBE, Vice-Chairman, Sunderland Savings Committee
- Arthur Gavin Stewart, lately Town Clerk of Motherwell and Wishaw
- Quintin Andrew Stewart, Divisional Veterinary Officer, Ministry of Agriculture and Fisheries
- Cecil Stonelake. For public services in Guernsey.
- Thomas Leonard Sturges, Staff Controller, South West Region, General Post Office
- William Sutherland, Area Secretary, British Legion, Northern Ireland
- John Edward Swain JP, Chairman, Peterborough Local Employment Committee
- The Right Honourable Gladys Helen Rachel, Dowager Baroness Swaythling, President of the Electrical Association for Women
- William Charles Swift, Assistant Director, Engineering, Ministry of Supply
- Frederick Joseph Talbot, Deputy Principal Regional Officer, Leeds, Ministry of Housing and Local Government
- Alderman Edward Taylor MBE, Chairman, Bath Savings Committee
- Matthew Templeton. For services to sheep breeding.
- Commander Edward Terrell, late R.N.V.R. Chairman, General Committee of the Chevrons Club
- Cecil Thomas, Sculptor and Medal Artist
- Basil Duncan Tims MBE, Principal, Commonwealth Relations Office
- Albert Ernest Tombs JP, Alderman, Borough of Abingdon, Berkshire
- Francis Henry Tomes, Chief Engineer, Lincolnshire River Board. For services during the recent floods in the Eastern Counties.
- Ernest William James Towler, H.M. Inspector of Schools, Ministry of Education
- Clement John Tranter, Associate Professor of Mathematics, Royal Military College of Science, War Office
- Ernest Trillwood, Lately Secretary, Jewellery and Silverware Council
- Philip John Owen Trist, County Agricultural Officer, East Suffolk. For services during the recent floods in the Eastern Counties.
- Harold Walker. For political and public services in Somerset.
- Ulric Bertram Walmsley MBE, Chairman, Chelsea Savings Committee
- Bartholomew Walsh. For political and public services.
- Harry Ward MBE, Head of Treaty and Nationality Department, Foreign Office
- Harold Joseph Hughes Wassell, Chief Radar Development Engineer, Marconi's Wireless Telegraph Company, Ltd.
- Oscar Samuel Watkinson, Clerk to the Hunstanton Urban District Council. For services during the recent floods in the Eastern Counties.
- Nita Grace Mary Watts, Economic Adviser, Cabinet Office
- Eileen Alexandra Waugh, lately Commissioner, Irish Division, Girls' Life Brigade
- Lieutenant-Commander Arthur Geoffrey Gascoyne Webb, Royal Navy (Retired), Deputy Secretary and Appeals Secretary, King George's Fund for Sailors
- Arthur Leslie Alabaster West, Treasurer, North-West Metropolitan Regional Hospital Board
- William West, Staff Engineer, Research Station, General Post Office
- Elizabeth Mary Western MBE, County Organiser, Essex, Women's Voluntary Services. For services during the recent floods in the Eastern Counties.
- John Duncan White , Director, Radiodiagnostic Department, Hammersmith Hospital
- Alan Paul Francis Whitworth, Director, Incorporated Society of British Advertisers, Ltd.
- John Henry Wigglesworth, General Secretary, Iron, Steel and Metal Dressers' Trade Society
- Charles Timothy Wilkins, Assistant Chief Designer, De Havilland Aircraft Company, Ltd.
- Major Thomas Macfarlane Wilks MBE TD MRCS LRCP, Area Commissioner, St. John Ambulance Brigade, London. For services during the recent floods in the Eastern Counties.
- Alderman Daniel Thomas Williams JP, For political and public services in Cardiff.
- William Sidney Gwynn Williams. For services to the International Eisteddfod at Llangollen
- Lieutenant-Colonel Clifford Llewellyn Wilson MC DL, County Director, Essex, British Red Cross Society. For services during the recent floods in the Eastern Counties.
- The Right Honourable Ivor Grosvenor, Viscount Wimborne. For political and public services.
- Thomas Arnold Woodcock JP, Headmaster, Ashby-de-la-Zouch Grammar School for Boys
- James Arthur Woodford RA, Sculptor
- Constance Muriel Wyatt, Director, Civilian Welfare Department, British Red Cross Society

Diplomatic Service and Overseas List

- Aaron Abensur, British subject resident in Tangier
- Hubert Thomas Booker, British subject resident in Peru
- The Right Reverend George Alexander Chambers, Chaplain at Her Majesty's Embassy in Paris
- William Thomas Clark, Commissioner, Port Sudan
- Frederick Barber Denham, Acting General Manager in Israel of the Ottoman Bank
- Leonard Henry Dismore, lately Her Majesty's Consul at Medan
- Rudolph Philip Elwes MC Senior Control Officer, Dortmund, Control Commission for Germany (British Element)
- Leonard Arthur Frenken MBE Attached to the United Kingdom Trade Commissioner, Singapore
- Professor Edward Vivian Gatenby, Linguistics Adviser to the British Council in Turkey
- Iain Archibald Gillespie, Senior Veterinary Inspector, Sudan Government
- Conrad Frederick Heron, lately First Secretary (Labour) at Her Majesty's Embassy in Brussels
- John Wynn Kenrick, District Commissioner, Omdurman, Sudan
- Emile Philip Lecours, First Secretary (Information) at Her Majesty's Embassy in Mexico City
- Colonel William Joseph Moody FRCS lately Medical Adviser to the British Political Resident and Chief Quarantine Medical Officer, Persian Gulf
- John Massey Morris MBE Chief Electrical and Mechanical Engineer, Basra Port
- Charles Joseph Plumb, Principal, lately Control Commission for Germany (British Element)
- Henry Richards Assistant Director (Public Health), Sudan Government
- Edward John Roberts, Senior Public Safety Officer, Carinthia, Austria.
- Ina Amelia Strong MBE Her Majesty's Consul at Bergen
- Emrys Cadwaladr Thomas LRCP Director of the Victoria Hospital, Damascus
- Allan Veitch MBE Her Majesty's Consul at Shanghai
- John Thorp Whittaker, Temporary Chief Executive Officer, Control Commission for Germany (British Element)

Colonies, Protectorates, etc

- Ann Frances Ellen Adams, Matron, Lachlan Park Mental Hospital, State of Tasmania
- Thomas Malcolm Arthur, Chairman of the Pakistan Tea Association, 1952–53
- John Henry Belderson, Principal Auditor, Basutoland, the Bechuanaland Protectorate and Swaziland
- John Bishop, Elder Professor of Music 'at the University of Adelaide, State of South Australia
- Ferdinand Hugo Bosman, Director of Agriculture, Bechuanaland Protectorate
- Edgar Esteban Cockram, Vice-Chairman of the Bombay Branch of the United Kingdom Citizens' Association in India
- Mary Cumming. For services rendered under the auspices of the Victoria League in connection with hospitality to visitors from overseas
- Mary Stuart Douglas, President of the Ex-Servicewomen's Association, and State Commissioner for Girl Guides, State of South Australia
- William Llewellyn Garratt, Secretary for Mines and Transport, Southern Rhodesia
- Gladys Ruth Gibson, Inspector, Education Department, and President of the National Council of Women, State of South Australia
- Alfred Arthur Haylbs, Editor of The Mail, Madras. For services to the United Kingdom community in South India.
- John George Maydon King MBE Director of Livestock and Agricultural Services, Basutoland
- Sydney Vernon Lawrenson, Administrative Officer, Staff Grade, Bechuanaland Protectorate
- Henry Gerald Livingston, Secretary of the Beit Trust in Southern Rhodesia
- Alan Campbell Mckay, Chairman of the Exchange Banks Association in Karachi. For services to the United Kingdom community in West Pakistan.
- William Charles Morris, formerly Headmaster of the Launceston High School, State of Tasmania
- Major Cecil John Somerset Paddon, Honorary Secretary and President, Society of the 1893 Column, Southern Rhodesia. For social welfare services, particularly to the pioneers and their families.
- Eric Drew Palmer, Chairman of the Food Production Committee, Southern Rhodesia
- Rex Whaddon Parsons, Principal, School of Mines and Industries, State of South Australia
- Sarah Anderson Jamieson Rankine Medical Officer in charge of St. Margaret's Hospital, Poona, Bombay
- Victor Lloyd Robinson, Attorney General, Southern Rhodesia
- The Reverend Canon James Russel Robson, Priest-in-Charge of St. Paul's School Mission, Scott's Lane, Sealdah, Calcutta, India
- George Robertson Ross Member of the Public Services Board, Southern Rhodesia
- William Wilson JP Council Clerk of the Lilydale Municipality, and formerly Secretary of the Municipal Association, State of Tasmania

Colonial Service

- Robert Patrick Baffour. For public and social services in the Gold Coast.
- William Muir Bissell, Commissioner of Labour, British Guiana
- Frank Stanley Blomfield, Deputy Chief Clerk and Deputy Establishment Officer, Office of the Crown Agents for the Colonies
- Edward Justin Borron, Assistant General Manager, Nyasaland Railways
- Herbert Colling Wood Algernon Bryant, Colonial Administrative Service, Administrative Officer, Western Pacific
- Ratu George Cakobau, Fijian Chief, Fiji
- Channes Gavril Chakarian. For public services in Cyprus.
- Leonard Jan Bruce-Chwatt, Senior Malariologist, Nigeria
- Ena Phyllis Clark, Colonial Education Service, Assistant Director of Education (Women and Girls), Gold Coast
- Richard Alexander Seymour Cory Colonial Medical Service, Senior Medical Officer, Tuberculosis Sanitorium, Jamaica
- Lionel Cresson. For public services in Singapore.
- Maurice Herbert Davis. For public services in St. Kitts, Leeward Islands.
- Anthony Falzon, Manager, Water and Electricity Department, Malta
- Maurice William Ghersie, Director of Produce Disposal, East African Production and Supply Council
- Richard Whalley Gill, Colonial Administrative Service, District Officer, Uganda
- Geoffrey Leicester Gray, Colonial Administrative Service, Deputy Chief Secretary, North Borneo
- Robert William Green. For services to sport in Aden.
- Albert Joseph Hawe FRCP Colonial Medical Service, Senior Specialist, Gold Coast
- Ernest Cranfield Hicks, Colonial Education Service, Senior Inspector of Schools, Perak, Federation of Malaya
- Patrick Hamilton Hutchison, Custodian of Enemy Property, Tanganyika
- Effion Jones, Colonial Engineering Service, Senior Executive Engineer, Nigeria
- Thomas George Clayton Vaughan-Jones, Director of Game and Tsetse, Control, Northern Rhodesia
- Arthur Harry Kneller, Deputy Labour Commissioner, Kenya
- Gordon King FRCS FRCOG Professor of Obstetrics and Gynaecology, University of Hong Kong
- Kwok Chan JP For public and social services in Hong Kong.
- Alistair James Mcintosh, Political Officer, Western Aden Protectorate
- Gabriel Martial. For public services in Mauritius.
- Alexander Mercer, Head of Posts and Telegraphs Department and Member of Executive Council, Falkland Islands
- William Morrissey Milliken, Colonial Administrative Service, Senior District Officer, Nigeria
- Charles Frederick Mummery, Chief Dental Officer, Federation of Malaya.
- George Edward Noel Oehlers. For services to Local Government in Singapore
- Dudley Murray O'Neale, Colonial Engineering Service, Deputy Director of Works and Hydraulics, Trinidad
- John Atta Opoku, Head of the Asantehene's Lands Department, Gold Coast
- Douglas Alexander Pott, Colonial Administrative Service, Administrative Officer, Nigeria
- Anthony Berthon Roche, Controller of Immigration, Federation of Malaya
- Archdeacon Lewis John Rowe, Archdeacon and Rural Dean of Demerara, British Guiana
- Diomedes Michael Skettos, Colonial Administrative Service, Administrative Officer, Cyprus
- Alfred Cecil Smith ED JP For services to planting in the Federation of Malaya.
- Charles Edward Snell. For public services in Nyasaland.
- James Stevenson MBE Colonial Survey Service, Director of Surveys and Lands, Sierra Leone
- Captain George Stivala, Commissioner for Malta in Australia
- John Hollingsworth Tanner, Chief Aviation Officer, Tanganyika
- Captain Leonard Maurice Thompson, Manager and Chief Pilot, Bahamas Airways
- Alexander Hamilton Thomson. For services to Local Government in Northern Rhodesia.
- Samuel Seward Toddings. For public services in Bermuda.
- Ts-o Tsun On. For public services in Hong Kong.
- Harold Maxwell Watson, Colonial Audit Service, Director of Audit, Fiji
- James Kerr Watson, Deputy Director of Public Works, Uganda
- Thomas Edwin Went MBE lately Colonial Engineer, Barbados
- Dennis Charles White, Colonial Administrative Service, Resident, Third Division, Sarawak
- Jane Benyie Williams. For social services in Barbados.
- Donald Bagster Wilson Colonial Medical Service, Director, East Africa Malaria Unit
- Russell Storey Wollen. For services to the Dairy, Coffee and Pig Industries in Kenya.

Honorary Officers

- Lee Ewe Boon, State Financial Officer, Kedah, Federation of Malaya
- Dato Zainal Abidin Bin Haji Abbas, Deputy Chairman, Rural and Industrial Development Authority, Federation of Malaya
- Mohammad, Wali of Bornu, Northern Regional Minister of Natural Resources, Nigeria
- Mallam Aliyu, Makaman Bida, Northern Regional Minister of Education, Nigeria
- Paulo Neil Kavuma, Katikiro, Uganda
- Fazel Nasser Mawji. For public services in Zanzibar.

==== Members (MBE) ====
===== Military Division =====
- Lieutenant Raymond Denzil Andrews
- Lieutenant-Commander (E) Ronald William Brenton, Royal Navy
- Shipwright Lieutenant-Commander Percy Roy Butler, Royal Navy (Retired)
- Lieutenant-Commander Thomas Hayward De Winton RNVR
- Lieutenant (E) Alfred Louis Giordan DSC Royal Navy
- Lieutenant-Commander (Sp.) Stanley Eastman Hills RNVR (serving with the Indian Navy)
- Temporary Senior Commissioned Boatswain Leslie Lawrence Janaway, Royal Navy
- Lieutenant (E) Edgar Jack Johnston DSC Royal Navy (Retired)
- Instructor Lieutenant-Commander Arthur Reginald Jones, Royal Navy
- Captain William Lang, Royal Marines
- Lieutenant Stanley Leonard, Royal Navy
- Lieutenant-Commander (L) Charles Henry Messenger, Royal Navy
- Lieutenant-Commander (S) George William Gundry Midlane BEM Royal Navy
- Acting Lieutenant-Commander (S) Daniel Joseph O'Leary, Royal Navy
- Lieutenant Edgar Osborne, Royal Navy
- Lieutenant (E) Frederick Charles Rowsell, Royal Navy
- Commissioned Recruiter Frederick Henry Rudge, Royal Navy
- Senior Commissioned Wardmaster William Percival Silk, Royal Navy
- Lieutenant-Commander Horace Robinson Spedding, Royal Navy
- Arthur Reginald Winter, Radio Officer RFA Service
- Temporary Acting Commissioned Engineer Albert Edward Wood, Royal Navy (lately on loan to the Government of India)
- Major Charles William James Aldred, General List
- Major (Quartermaster) Harold Vivian Alley, Royal Armoured Corps
- Major (Quartermaster) Edwin Ashley, Royal Army Medical Corps
- Warrant Officer Class II William Ashurst, Royal Army Ordnance Corps
- Major Malcolm Stewart Balmain, 15th/19th The King's Royal Hussars, Royal Armoured Corps
- Captain (acting) Eric Andrew Barnes TD Combined Cadet Force
- Major Richard Thurstine Basset MC The Rifle Brigade (Prince Consort's Own)
- Warrant Office Class II Harry Bell, Royal Army Pay Corps
- Major Marcus Ernest Francis Bell, Corps of Royal Engineers
- Major (Quartermaster) Thomas Benbow, The Devonshire Regiment
- Warrant Officer Class I Albert Sidney Charles Blackshaw, 7th Queen's Own Hussars, Royal Armoured Corps
- Captain Robert Henry Bloomer, The Buffs (Royal East Kent Regiment)
- Major (Quartermaster) Arthur Leonard Bolt, Royal Regiment of Artillery
- Major (now Lieutenant-Colonel) Ernest Laurence Briggs TD Corps of Royal Engineers, Territorial Army
- Major John Bywaters, The Middlesex Regiment (Duke of Cambridge's Own)
- Warrant Office Class H John Cardownie, Royal Regiment of Artillery Territorial Army
- Captain Roland Ferguson Cole, Royal Pioneer Corps
- Warrant Office Class II Norman Coleman, The Royal Ulster Rifles. Territorial Army
- Major (Quartermaster) James Reginald Coles, Employed List II (late Royal Army Service Corps)
- Major (temporary) David Craig. G.M., Royal Regiment of Artillery.
- Warrant Officer Class 1 Clifford Claude Cross, Royal Corps of Signals
- Major (Quartermaster) Thomas William Croucher, Corps of Royal Electrical and Mechanical Engineers
- Captain John Davies MM
- Major (temporary) (now Captain) Frank Alan Day, The Royal Sussex Regiment
- Major (O.E.O.) James Frederick De Grau, Royal Army Ordnance Corps
- Major (D.O.) Arthur William Dell
- Major (acting) William Dickson, Combined Cadet Force
- Lieutenant (Quartermaster) Francis James Dodd, The Royal Scots Greys (2nd Dragoons), Royal Armoured Corps
- Major Alan Stanley Eccles TD Royal Regiment of Artillery, Territorial Army
- Warrant Officer Class I Frederick George Farmer. Royal Army Service Corps
- Major Paul Ernest Archer Folliss, Royal Army Service Corps
- Warrant Officer Class I (acting) Andrew Hepburn Fraser, Royal Tank Regiment, Royal Armoured Corps
- Major The Honourable Ralfe Evans-Freke, The Rifle Brigade (Prince Consort's Own)
- Warrant Officer Class II Harold Douglas French. Royal Army Service Corps
- Major Gary William Fullbrook
- Warrant Officer Class II Frederick John George, Corps of Royal Engineers
- Captain (Quartermaster) Gordon Jack Gillings, Royal Corps of Signals
- Captain Walter Kendal Gott, Royal Pioneer Corps
- Captain (Quartermaster) George Alfred Stuart Graham, 17th/21st Lancers, Royal Armoured Corps
- Warrant Officer Class II Harold Stanley Haden, The Royal Berkshire Regiment (Princess Charlotte of Wales's),
- Major Michael Stephen Hancock
- Warrant Officer Class II Joan Mary Harris BEM Women's Royal Army Corps
- Major (temporary) Alfred Philip Holland Hartley, The Cheshire Regiment
- Major (Quartermaster) John Henry Cornelius Hawkins, Royal Regiment of Artillery
- Major (O.E.O.) Frederick Roy Horne, Royal Army Ordnance Corps
- Major (Quartermaster) William Edgar Hurst, Employed List II (late Royal Army Service Corps)
- Captain Tom Jagger, The Argyll and Sutherland Highlanders (Princess Louise's)
- Lieutenant-Colonel (local) Arthur John Ketley, Royal Regiment of Artillery
- Major Frank Douglas King, The Wiltshire Regiment (Duke of Edinburgh's).
- Major James John Lamb TD Royal Army Ordnance Corps, Territorial Army
- Warrant Officer Class II Frank Larkin, Corps of Royal Engineers, Territorial Army
- Major Anthony David Lewis DSO The Dorset Regiment
- Major (Quartermaster) Leonard Henry Littlejohn, The Queen's Bays (2nd Dragoon Guards), Royal Armoured Corps
- Warrant Officer Class I Charles Black Macdonald MM Corps of Royal Electrical and Mechanical Engineers, Territorial Army
- Major (temporary) John Mackinnon-Little, Corps of Royal Engineers
- Major Alfred Frederick Marich
- Major Thomas Saunders Markham, General List, attached Corps of Royal Electrical and Mechanical Engineers (now retired)
- Major John Fitzgerald May, The Buffs (Royal East Kent Regiment)
- Captain (acting) William John Ferguson McWhor, Army Cadet Force
- Warrant Officer Class I David Benjamin Morris, The Parachute Regiment
- Honorary Major Francis Seward Neale, Combined Cadet Force (now retired)
- Major (acting) Norman McDowell Nevin, Army Cadet Force
- Major (Quartermaster) Francis Herbert Newland, Royal Army Medical Corps
- Major Leonard James Oliver, Corps of Royal Engineers
- Warrant Officer Class I Ralph Reginald Opie, Royal Regiment of Artillery
- Major (temporary) Robert Linnaeus Peat, Royal Pioneer Corps
- Major Edwin Seth Wolfe Perkins, Royal Army Service Corps, Territorial Army
- Major Charles James Phillips, Corps of Royal Electrical and Mechanical Engineers
- Warrant Officer Class I (Artillery Clerk) Albert Joseph Rayner, Royal Regiment of Artillery, Territorial Army
- Major Edgar Lynton Richards MC The Parachute Regiment, Territorial Army
- Warrant Officer Class I (acting) Frank Robb, Corps of Royal Electrical and Mechanical Engineers
- Captain (Quartermaster) Walter John Robertson, Royal Corps of Signals
- Major (temporary) Arthur William Robinson, Royal Tank Regiment, Royal Armoured Corps
- Major Stanley David Sharman, Royal Regiment of Artillery
- Captain James Christopher Shaw, The East Lancashire Regiment
- Major (temporary) Pauline Mary Shilton, Women's Royal Army Corps
- Captain Bertram Donald Newton Siminson, Royal Army Educational Corps
- Major John. Richard Guy Stanton, The Royal Sussex Regiment
- Major Frederick Passmore Stewart, Royal Corps of Signals
- Major George Charles Thompson, Army Catering Corps
- Major (D.O.) Ernest Walter Walford, Royal Regiment of Artillery
- Major (Quartermaster) David Clifford Watson, The South Staffordshire Regiment
- Major (acting) (now Lieutenant-Colonel (acting)) Robert Watson, Army Cadet Force
- Major (temporary) Sidney John Watson, Corps of Royal Engineers
- Warrant Officer Class II (now Colour-Sergeant) Francis William Welch, The Gloucestershire Regiment
- Warrant Officer Class II Frederick Thomas Weller, Corps of Royal Military Police
- Warrant Officer Class II Charles Henry Williams, The Welch Regiment, Territorial Army
- Captain (Quartermaster) George Samuel Thomas Woods, The Welch Regiment
- Major Tom Pickering Salisbury Woods, Royal Regiment of Artillery
- Warrant Officer Class I (acting) Eric Anthony Wright, Royal Army Pay Corps
- Major (Quartermaster) Herbert John Ingle Wright, 4th/7th Royal Dragoon Guards, Royal Armoured Corps
- Major Clarence Bavin Adams, Southern Rhodesia Territorial Forces
- Captain Walter Frederick Smith Belton, Rhodesian African Rifles, Southern Rhodesia Military Forces
- Major Cyril Richard Alick Blackwell ED Southern Rhodesia Territorial Forces
- Warrant Officer Class I Alexander Thomson Robertson, Royal Corps of Signals, until recently on loan to the Government of India
- Major Arthur Nathaniel Braude ED Royal Hong Kong Defence Force
- Major John Charles Michael Grenham, Commanding Officer, Home Guard, Royal Hong Kong Defence Force
- Warrant Officer Class I Mahmud bin Udin, The Malay Regiment
- Major Colin Milton ED Officer Commanding, Singapore Army Service Corps
- Major David Nicholls, Royal Army Service Coups, Adjutant, Federation of Malaya Volunteer Army Service Corps
- Squadron Leader Allan John Laird Craig DSO DFC AFC Royal Air Force
- Squadron Leader Herbert Ernest Hunt, Royal Air Force Regiment
- Squadron Leader Dugald Thomas Moore Lumsden, Royal Air Force
- Squadron Leader Charles Keith Street, Royal Air Force
- Acting Squadron Leader Samuel Gilchrist, Royal Air Force
- Acting Squadron Leader Ronald Charles Instrell DFC Royal Air Force
- Acting Squadron Leader Stanley James, Royal Air Force
- Acting Squadron Leader Cecil Thomas Nixon Moore, Royal Air Force Regiment
- Acting Squadron Leader Robert James Reid, Royal Air Force Volunteer Reserve
- Acting Squadron Officer Mary Hope Shaw, Women's Royal Air Force
- Flight Lieutenant William Sanders Brokenshire, Royal Air Force
- Flight Lieutenant Apostolos Contaris AFC Royal Air Force
- Flight Lieutenant John Carey Cottam, Royal Air Force
- Flight Lieutenant Richard Page Hall, Royal Air Force
- Flight Lieutenant Ernest Walter Hassall, Royal Air Force
- Flight Lieutenant John David Jolly, Royal Air Force
- Flight Lieutenant Henry Frederick Victor Marshall, Royal Air Force
- Flight Lieutenant Roy Parsons, Royal Air Force
- Flight Lieutenant Samuel Waters Pattinson, Royal Air Force
- Flight Lieutenant Harold Coatsworth Robinson, Royal Air Force
- Flight Lieutenant George Wardrop Scott AFC Royal Auxiliary Air Force
- Flight Lieutenant Ronald William Sparkes DFC Royal Air Force
- Flight Lieutenant Richard Arthur Targett, Royal Air Force
- Flight Lieutenant Clifford John Turner, Royal Air Force
- Flight Lieutenant George Edward Veasey, Royal Air Force
- Acting Flight Lieutenant Horace William Gibbons, Royal Air Force Volunteer Reserve
- Flying Officer William Laurence Lawrenson, Royal Air Force
- Warrant Officer William Stanley Carlile, Royal Air Force
- Warrant Officer Ronald Dixon, Royal Air Force
- Warrant Officer Wilfred Edward Elkins, Royal Air Force
- Warrant Officer Archibald Hay Hamilton, Royal Air Force
- Warrant Officer Reginald John Hole, Royal Air Force
- Warrant Officer Sidney Edward Humphries, Royal Air Force
- Warrant Officer John Henry Large, Royal Air Force
- Warrant Officer Samuel Lee, Royal Air Force
- Warrant Officer Alfred John Lewis, Royal Air Force
- Warrant Officer Frederick George Marsh, Royal Air Force
- Warrant Officer Patrick Joseph O'Reilly, Royal Air Force
- Warrant Officer Leslie Sanderson, Royal Air Force
- Warrant Officer Enock Tempest Southorn, Royal Air Force
- Warrant Officer Charley Henry Stanley, Royal Air Force
- Acting Warrant Officer Tom Dawson, Royal Air Force

Honorary Members

- Warrant Officer Class II Abdul Manap bin Abdullah, The Malay Regiment
- Warrant Officer Class II Amat bin Idris, The Malay Regiment
- Captain Ariffin bin Jamail, The Malay Regiment
- Major Ismail bin Tahar, The Malay Regiment
- Captain Khalid bin Hashim, The Malay Regiment
- Warrant Officer Class II Mohamed Shah bin Mohamed Aris, The Malay Regiment
- Warrant Officer Class I Mohammed Arriff bin Ariffin, The Malay Regiment
- NWarrant Officer Class II Mohammed Yassin bin Ahmad, The Malay Regiment

===== Civil Division =====
- John Adams MM lately Adjutant, Ulster Special Constabulary
- Nolan Harris Aldersley, Radio Officer, M.V. Australia Star, Siemens Brothers and Company, Ltd.
- James Lauchland Alexander, Actuary of the Devon and Exeter Savings Bank
- William George Allen, Senior Experimental Officer, Directorate of Electronics Research and Development (Air), Ministry of Supply
- Dorothy Alston, County Secretary, Somerset, Women's Voluntary Services
- Dorothy Lucy Anderson, Centre Organiser, Brentwood, Essex, Women's Voluntary Services. For services during the recent floods in the Eastern Counties.
- John Hay Anderson, Purser, S.S. City of Exeter, Ellerman Lines, Ltd.
- Richard Oakley Andrews JP Member, Bedfordshire Agricultural Executive Committee
- Robert Henry John Angus, Superintendent of Stores, Board of Customs and Excise
- Albert Anslow, Production Manager, Joseph Sankey and Sons, Ltd., Wellington, Shropshire
- Victoria Armstrong, Honorary Secretary and Collector, School Savings Group, Ballymena
- Margaret Rachel Arrowsmith. For political and public services in Ebbw Vale.
- Edward Wilkinson Ashby, Chief Tanker Designer, Joseph L. Thompson and Sons, Ltd., Sunderland
- Thomas McMinn Ashford, Chief Smoke Inspector and Technical Engineer, Glasgow Corporation
- Henry Sidney Atkinson MRCS LRCP Chairman of Committee, No. 135 (Reigate and Redhill) Squadron, Air Training Corps
- John Atkinson. For political and public services in Derbyshire.
- Thomas John Aven DCM Higher Executive Officer, National Assistance Board
- Egon Benedict Babler, Chief of Metallurgic and General Research Laboratory, Allen West and Company, Ltd., Brighton
- Horace Charles Baldwin, Senior Executive Officer, Foreign Office
- Harold Barbrook, Food Executive Officer, Ministry of Food. For services during the recent floods in the Eastern Counties.
- Ronald Renton Barker, Senior Auditor, Exchequer and Audit Department
- Samuel John Barlow, Honorary Secretary, Bridport Savings Committee, Dorset
- Sidney George Barnes, Superintendent, Lincolnshire County Constabulary. For services during the recent floods in the Eastern Counties.
- Elsa Barratt. For public services in Skegness.
- Robert Nathan Bates. For political and public services in Norfolk.
- Lewis George Baum, Superintendent and Deputy Chief Constable, Cumberland and Westmorland Constabulary
- Archibald Baxter, Assistant Manager, Shipbuilding Department, Vickers-Armstrongs, Ltd., Barrow-in-Furness
- Sidney John Bayliss, Senior Executive Officer, General Post Office
- Alderman Ernest George Bearcroft. For political and public services in Yorkshire.
- Edwin Alfred Walter Beasant. For political and public services in Swindon.
- Zoe Daphne Morrison Beaton JP Area Organiser, East Central Lancashire, Women's Voluntary Services
- Charles William Bellerby, Executive Officer, War Office
- Neil Benson, Foreign Office
- Phyllis Mabel Betts, Assistant Establishment Officer, Church Commissioners
- Leslie Alfred Bird MC Senior-Executive Officer, Ministry of Supply
- William George Bird, Senior Executive Offiqer, Ministry of Works
- Margaret Mackenzie Black, Executive Officer, Crown Office, Scotland
- Harold Blackburn, Chairman, Bournemouth Savings Committee
- Arthur Henry Blackwell, Director and Works Manager, David Brown Companies, Meltham, Yorkshire
- Florence Ada Blackwell, Executive Officer, Ministry of Education.
- John Alan Blake. For services as Area Supervisor, Navy, Army and Air Force Institutes, British Army of the Rhine
- Major Henry Rokeby Bond. For services in a civilian capacity in Malaya
- Alfred Edward Booth, District Officer, H.M. Coastguard, Ministry of Transport
- Leslie George Bourne, Convoy Officer, Midland Region Food Flying Squads. For services during the recent floods in the Eastern Counties.
- James McGown Bowes, Honorary Secretary, Rolls-Royce, Ltd., Glasgow, Savings Group
- Grace Mary Darbyshire-Bowles, County Organiser, Norfolk, Women's Voluntary Services. For services during the recent floods in the Eastern Counties.
- Gertrude Lyford Born. For political and public services in Ayrshire.
- Victor Henry Bradley, Deputy Principal, Ministry of Agriculture, Northern Ireland
- Cyril Alfred Brazier, Higher Executive Officer, Ministry of Housing and Local Government
- Frederick Christian Bridges, Senior Executive Officer, Ministry of Supply
- Ann Brooks, Higher Executive Officer, Forestry Commission (Scotland)
- Harry James Brooks, Honorary Secretary, Louth Savings Committee, Lincolnshire
- Walter Frank Brooks, Production Superintendent, Alfred Graham and Company, Ltd., Halifax
- Charles John Brown, Grade 3 Officer, Foreign Office
- Frederick Ernest Francis Brown MM Chief Executive Officer, Ministry of Pensions
- Thomas Brown, lately Forester, Dartington Hall, Totnes, South Devon
- Anna Fullerton Bruce, Head of Young Women's Christian Association Service Centre, Bad Oyenihausen, British Army of the Rhine
- William Sandy Bryant, Senior Architect, Ministry of Works
- James Bryce, Manager, Shipyard Plant Department, Harland and Wolff, Ltd., Belfast
- James Buckley, Works Manager, Thomas Robinson and Son, Ltd., Rochdale
- Nellie Elizabeth Budge, Chief Superintendent of Typists. Board of Trade
- Alan Durtnall Bullock, Senior Executive Officer, Ministry of Housing and Local Government
- Harold James Bullock, Secretary, Bristol Port Area Grain Committee
- Arthur Newman Bunce, Clerical Officer, Admiralty
- Emily Isabel Bunce, Matron, Moss Side Hospital, Ministry of Health
- Harold Francis Burnell, Higher Executive Officer, Board of Trade
- Percy Beard Frank Burr, Inspector of Kitchen Waste Collections, Ministry of Agriculture and Fisheries
- Moses Busby, Chairman, Dungannon Rural District Council, Co. Tyrone
- Charles Paul Byrne, Staff Officer, Board of Inland Revenue
- Cicely Cardew, Voluntary Worker, Wormwood Scrubs Boys' Prison
- Alfred Herbert Carding, Works Director, Smart and Brown (Machine Tools), Ltd., Biggleswade
- Thomas Johnstone Lipton Carmichael, Higher Executive Officer, Ministry of Transport
- Joseph King Carson, General Secretary, Ulster Teachers' Union
- Albert Harry Carter, Assistant Chief Constable, Gloucestershire Constabulary
- William Carter, Departmental Manager, Alfred Dunihill, Ltd.
- Arthur Sidney Cartwright, Director and Secretary, Oak Tanning Company, Ltd.
- William Cater, Executive Officer Cabinet Office
- Augustus Cave, Senior Executive Officer, General Post Office
- Charles Chadwick, Honorary Secretary, Milnrow Savings Committee, Lancashire
- Walter Robert Chamberlain, Chairman, Nuneaton Local Employment Committee
- Claude Edwin Channing, Higher Executive Officer, Government Actuary's Department
- Frederick Charles Chapman, Manager, Beamish Mary, Handen Hold, Twizell Burn and Alma Collieries, Durham Division, National Coal Board
- Marjorie Joan Chenhalls, Civil Assistant, War Office
- Isidore Civval, Inspector of Taxes, Board of Inland Revenue
- Frank Clapham, Trade Union Vice-Chairman, Wolverhampton District Advisory Committee, Midlands Regional Board for Industry
- Duncan Walker Clark. For services to Drama in Falkirk
- Robert Noel Lightfoot Clarke, Plant Manager, Imperial Chemical Industries, Ltd., Alkali Division
- Doris Marian Cleland, Senior Executive Officer, Ministry of National Insurance
- Harold Cocker, Works Manager, Beatson, Clark and Company, Ltd., Rotherham
- Catherine Mary Codling, Senior Clerk, East Lancashire Territorial and Auxiliary Forces Association
- Kenneth Barrett Colam, Chief Officer, Wakefield Fire Brigade
- Llewellyn Lancelot Cole, Senior Executive Officer, Ministry of Works
- Bert Coulson Coles JP Headmaster, Alford Secondary Modern School, Lincoln-shire. For services during the recent floods in the Eastern Counties.
- Charles Stratum Colley, Housing Manager, Ruislip-Northwood Urban District Council
- Dorothy Joan Collihole, Director, Periodicals Department, British Council
- Joseph Walker Collinson. For political and public services in Thornaby-on-Tees.
- Ayleen Finlay Conway, Head of the Probation and Prison Welfare Department, Women's Voluntary Services
- John Herbert Cooke, Chairman, Thornbury Rural District Council, Gloucestershire
- Leslie Arthur Coombs. For political services.
- Denis Edward James Cooper, Chairman, Lochbroom District Council. For services during the hurricane in North-West Scotland
- James Cormack, Superintendent, Society for Welfare and Teaching of the Blind (Edinburgh and South-East Scotland)
- Arthur Edmund Cotton, Deputy Superintendent, Directorate General of Works, Air Ministry
- Kenneth Edgar Cotton, Chief Engineer, East Suffolk and Norfolk River Board. For services during the recent floods in the Eastern Counties.
- Albert Walter Cox, Principal Assistant, Legal and Parliamentary Department, London County Council
- Herbert David Cox, Principal Surveyor, Tithe Redemption Commission
- Vera Cox, Marketing Organiser, National Federation of Women's Institutes
- Frederick John Baker Craighill, Senior Executive Officer. Government Hospitality Fund
- Captain Quentin Charles Alexander Craufurd, Royal Navy (Retired), Honorary Secretary, Dungeness Lifeboat Station
- Ada Gertrude Creegan, Chairman, Lewisham Street Groups Savings Subcommittee
- William Henry John Crees, Higher Executive Officer, Ministry of Transport
- Sidney Cresswell MM Superintendent, Staffordshire Constabulary
- Charles Henry Cribbes, Senior Executive Officer, Ministry of National Insurance
- Harry Critchley, Training Service Officer I, Ministry of Labour and National Service
- Mabel Winifred Cross, Local Representative
- Surbiton. Forces Help Society And Lord Roberts Workshops
- Edith Annie Crossley. For political and public services in Barkston Ash.
- Frederick George Crouch, lately Chief Male Nurse, Tooting Bee Mental Hospital
- Ada Crozier, Personnel Manager, Wm. Ewart and Son, Ltd., Belfast
- Douglas Cruden, Senior Fishery Officer, Scottish Home Department
- Harold Archibald Gray Curtis, Higher Executive Officer. Ministry of National Insurance
- Wilfred John Curtis, Surveyor, City District (London), Board of Customs and Excise
- Herbert John Cutler, Head of Furniture Department, High Wycombe College of Further Education
- William Henry Daniels, Vice-Chairman, Southampton Local Employment Committee
- Arthur Ernest Davies, Musical Director, Luton Girls' Choir
- John Lewis Eavies, Engineer and Surveyor, Leatherhead Urban District Council
- Gertrude Debrit Deave. For political and public services in Lewisham.
- Dorothy Annie Denny, Grade 3 Officer, Foreign Office
- Charles Montagu Dering, Senior Experimental Officer, Admiralty
- Sydney Edgar Devonald, lately Chairman, London and Southern England District, Joint District Scrap Drive Committee, British Iron and Steel Federation
- George Richard Septimus Dixon, Producer, School Broadcasting, British Broadcasting Corporation
- Major John Robert Donnelly, Administrative Secretary, Ex-Services Welfare Society
- Mary Emma Masterton Dougans, Private Secretary to the Permanent Secretary, Admiralty
- Thomas Scatchard Drake, Warden, Queen Elizabeth Home of Recovery for the Blind, Torquay
- Alfred Lever Duggan. For political and public services in Bristol.
- Alderman Thomas Dunn, Chairman, Barn-staple District Committee, Devon Agricultural Executive Committee.
- Squadron Leader William Harry Dunton, Civilian Substitution Officer, Royal Air Force School of Photography
- Alexander Haldon Dykes, Chief Engineer, M.V. Hibernian Coast, Coast Lines, Ltd.
- Catherine Dynes, Night Superintendent, Royal Victoria Hospital, Belfast
- John Goslett Edwards, Assistant Civil Engineer, H.M. Dockyard, Chatham. For services during the recent floods in the Eastern Counties.
- Reginald William Elkins, Regional Collector of Taxes, Board of Inland Revenue
- Jeannie Elliott. For political and public services in Nottingham.
- Albert Wilfrid Ellis. For political and public services in Essex.
- Stanley George Elmer, Executive Officer, War Office
- Albert Josiah Evans, Headmaster, Benfleet Secondary Modern School, Essex. For services during the recent floods in the Eastern Counties.
- Evan Rees Evans, Farmer, Llandyssul, Cardiganshire
- Gladys May Everett, Higher Executive Officer, Ministry of Health
- Charles Henry Exley MM Higher Executive Officer, Ministry of National Insurance
- Basil Grenville Fairbrother, Commissioner for the Church Army with the British Army of the Rhine
- Geoffrey Thomas Berridge Fall, Chief Accountant, Shipping Federation, Ltd.
- Fraser Farquharson, Chief Superintendent, City of Glasgow Police
- Harry Farrer, Skipper of a Fishing Vessel
- Catherine Jeanne Felton, Executive Officer, Cabinet Office
- Daisy Fenwick, Grade IV Clerk, United Kingdom Trade Commissioner's Office, Winnipeg
- William Nicol Forrest, Assistant Director of Supplies, H.M. Stationery Office
- Arnold Percy Forster, Placing Officer, Treforest Trading Estate, Ministry of Labour and National Service
- Marjorie Beatrice Forster, Personal Secretary, Colonial Development Corporation
- Sidney Charles Hudson Fossett, Works Manager, Carriage and Wagon Works, North Eastern Region, Railway Executive
- Donald Max Fountain, Agent, John Mowlem and Company, Ltd.
- Victor Reginald-Fox, Assistant Waterguard Superintendent, Newhaven, Board of Customs and Excise
- Dorothy Violet Franklin, Ward Sister, St. Bernard's (Mental) Hospital, Southall
- Albert Marskell Freeman, Headmaster, 1 Welling Secondary School for Boys, Kent
- Margaret Wilson Frew, Organising Secretary, the Erskine (Paraplegic) Coach and Comforts Fund, Renfrewshire
- William Garner MM Superintendent, Norfolk Constabulary. For services during the recent floods in the Eastern Counties.
- Samuel James Garton, Chief Investigator, Historic Buildings, Ministry of Housing and Local Government
- Minnie Gatenby, Sister Midwife, West Middlesex Hospital, Isleworth
- James Gayler, Chairman, London Regional Schools Advisory Savings Committee
- George Faimilo Gibson JP For public services in Nottinghamshire.
- Grace Gidley, lately Head Assistant, Southern Grove Lodge, London County Council Welfare Department
- Arthur Edgar Gilbert, Local Fuel Overseer for the City of Birmingham
- William Joseph Montague Gladden, Higher Executive Office, Air Ministry
- Joseph James Cecil Goulder, Clerk to the South Kesteven Rural District Council
- Edith Amy Gray. Headmistress, Bisbrooke Church of England School, Rutland
- Victor Gray, Naval Architect, Cochrane and Sons, Ltd., Selby
- William Llewelyn Alexander Gray, Chairman. North-East Wales War Pensions Committee
- Alec Alfred Green, Senior Experimental Officer, Pest Infestation Laboratory, Department of Scientific and Industrial Research
- Leslie William Green, Senior Executive Officer, Ministry of Civil Aviation
- Stephen Herbert Green, G.M|Engineer and Manager, Drainage Department, Thurrock Urban District Council. For services during the recent floods in the Eastern Counties.
- William Henry Green, Senior Executive Officer, Ministry of National Insurance
- Rosalys Joan Griffith, Examiner of Acts, House of Lords
- Jack Griffiths, Clerk to the Sheerness Urban District Council. For services during the recent floods in the Eastern Counties.
- Horace Frederick Griggs, Senior Executive Officer, Ministry of Civil Aviation
- Arthur Thomas Grimer, Senior Executive Officer, Ministry of National Insurance
- George Groves, Manager, Clipsham Stone Quarries, Oakham
- Leonard Arthur Grudgings, Chairman, Regional Schools Advisory Savings Committee, East Midlands Region
- William Joseph Gwilliam JP Alderman, Pembroke Borough Council
- Hubert Charles Langley Hackney, Senior Executive Officer, Ministry of Pensions
- Ernest Nelson Hall, Chief Executive Officer, Ministry of Supply
- Robert Joseph Reed Hancock, Senior Structural Engineer, Ministry of Works
- William Hanke. For political and public services in the West Midlands.
- Captain Thomas Jewitt Hansen, Master, S.S. Cormount, Wm. Cory and Son, Ltd.
- William Hudson Birrell Harley, Finance Secretary, British Broadcasting Corporation
- Ralph Hart, Assistant Regional Food Officer, Northern Region, Ministry of Food
- Hattie Dorinda Hartley. Senior Executive Officer. Ministry of Food
- Thomas George Haughton, Lately Secretary and Director, Churches Youth Welfare Council, Northern Ireland
- George William Haw, lately Secretary-Manager, Pocklington Co-operative Society
- John Allen Hawkins, Grade 3 Officer, Ministry of Labour and National Service
- Winefride Hayes, Chief Superintendent of Typists, Ministry of Works
- Richard Heath, Resident Warden, Claremont Rehabilitation Centre for Dock Workers. National Dock Labour Board
- Peter Henderson JP Area Labour Officer, East Fife Area, Scottish Division, National Coal Board
- Walter Henderson, Executive Officer, London Museum
- Francis Austin Henley, Sales Manager, Reinforced Shuttlecocks, Ltd.
- Constance Habbegell Henry, Higher Executive Officer, Ministry of Transport
- Harold Ernest Henson, Executive Officer, Regional Office, Leeds, Board of Trade
- Joseph Gordon Higgins, lately Superintendent, Carmarthenshire Constabulary
- Joseph Edward Hilder, Manager, Watford Employment Exchange, Ministry of Labour and National Service
- Charles Biglin Hill, Farmer, Easington, Yorkshire. For services during the recent floods in the Eastern Counties.
- Frederick William Hill, Joint Managing Director, F. W. Hill (Bognor Regis), Ltd., Builders and Contractors
- Harry Charles Hill, Superintendent, War Department Constabulary
- Henry Joseph Arthur Hill, Sales Manager, London, British European Airways
- John Frederick Hilton, Secretary, Trade Union Side, Departmental Joint Industrial Council
- Victor Arthur Hinde, Higher Executive Officer, Ministry of Civil Aviation
- Edward Charles Histed, Chief Draughtsman, Admiralty
- Charles Stansfield Kitchen, Resident Geologist, Tanganyika Coalfields and Iron Investigation, Colonial Development Corporation
- Wilfred John Hobbs, Works Manager, Drayton Regulator and Instrument Company, Ltd., West Drayton, Middlesex
- Enid Sidney Hobson, Executive Officer, London Hostels Association, Ltd.
- Albert Edward Hocking, Member, National Executive Council, British Legion
- Brian Holmes, Assistant Constructor, Admiralty. For services during the recent floods in the Eastern Counties.
- Cecil William Hopkins, Inspector of Taxes (Higher Grade), Board of Inland Revenue
- William Watson Hopkinson, Station Engineer, Dartford and Belvedere, South Eastern Gas Board. For services during the recent floods in the Eastern Counties.
- Frederick Alfred Horton, Steward, H.M. Prison, Wandsworth
- William Houghton, lately General Manager, Ipswich Beet Sugar Factory
- Sydney Charles Edward Howard, Higher Executive Officer, Ministry of Transport
- William Roy Howells, Chief Officer, Herefordshire Fire Brigade
- Cyril Frank Howes, Higher Executive Officer, Board of Trade
- Harold Hoyle, Assistant to Operating Superintendent (Freight Trains), Eastern and North Eastern Regions, Railway Executive
- Charles Henry Hudson JP Chairman, King's Lynn and District Local Employment Committee
- Alfred David Hull, Costing Secretary, British Federation of Master Printers
- Noel Kathleen Hunnybun, Senior Psychiatric Social Worker, Child Guidance Department, Tavistock Clinic, London
- Mary Roy Hunter, Production Manager, Ethicon Suture Laboratories, Edinburgh
- Thomas Chalmers Hunter, Distribution Engineer, Fife Sub-Area, South East Scotland Electricity Board
- William Imlach, Skipper of steam trawler Loch Awe. For services during the hurricane in North-West Scotland
- Robert Rhudd Innes. For political services in Edinburgh.
- Morris Isaacs, Supervisor of Factories, Jackson Associated Manufacturers, Ltd., Newcastle upon Tyne
- Ernest Samuel James, Higher Clerical Officer, Admiralty
- Celia Jarratt, Senior Major, Salvation Army. For services during the recent floods in the Eastern Counties.
- Doris Gertrude Jarvis, Clerical Officer, Home Office
- Arthur Ernest Jaynes, lately Chief Clerk, Gloucester District Probate Registry
- Francis Robert Jefford, Chief Sanitary Inspector, Municipal Borough of Cheltenham
- Aileen Machenry Johnston (Lady Fraser-Tytler), lately Chief Officer of the National Institute of Houseworkers
- Alan Edgar Johnston, Senior Executive Officer, Ministry of Transport
- Bessie Patience Johnston, County Director, City of Glasgow Branch, British Red Cross Society
- Anna Jones, School Meals Organiser, Denbighshire
- William Emlyn David Jones, Assistant County Agricultural Officer (Advisory), Pembrokeshire, Ministry of Agriculture and Fisheries
- Wilfred Harold Jupe, Higher Executive Officer, Ministry of Supply
- William George Keable, Higher Executive Officer, Ministry of Supply
- Arthur Stanley Keeling, Midland District Engineer, South Western Division, Docks and Inland Waterways Executive
- Robert Kerr, Deputy Accountant, North Western Gas Board
- Francis William Ernest King, Vice-Chairman, Amersham Rural District Council
- George King, Senior Research Chemist, Albright and Wilson, Ltd.
- Harold Alfred King, Depot Superintendent, Stockport, North Western Road Car Company, Ltd.
- Frank Oliver Kitteringham, Higher Executive Officer, Board of Trade
- Harold Frederick Knell, Sub-Area Manager (Kent), South Eastern Electricity Board. For services during the recent floods in the Eastern Counties.
- Captain William Anthony Kyne, Master, S.S. Ramsay, Bolton Steam Shipping Company, Ltd.
- Mary Marguerite Lace, Regional Organiser, North-Eastern Region, Women's Voluntary Services
- Albert Haynes Laidlaw, Chief Draughtsman, Vosper, Ltd., Portsmouth
- Ralph Thornton Lakin, Chief Engineer, Whiteley Electrical Radio Company, Ltd., Mansfield
- Alfred Dupear Lambert, Chief Engineer, S.S. Gardenia, Stag Line, Ltd.
- David Noble Lang, Area General Manager, South Western Division, National Coal Board
- John Henry Last, Chief Passport Officer, Office of the High Commissioner for the United Kingdom in the Union of South Africa
- Herbert Vincent Laurie, Headmaster, Thorparch Grange Approved School, Boston Spa, Yorkshire
- James Russell Lawrie, Headmaster, Kingsland School, Peebles
- William Leitch JP General Manager, Clydebank Co-operative Society
- Ceridwen Lewis, Matron, Ministry of Pensions Hospital, Rockwood, Llandaff, Cardiff
- Grace Lewis, Senior Adviser in Dairying and Poultry-keeping, North Region, Edinburgh and East of Scotland College of Agriculture
- Mary Dorothy Lewis JP Chairman, Cardiff Street Groups Savings Sub-Committee
- Reginald Gwyn Leyshon, Secretary and Comptroller, Anglo-Celtic Watch Company, Ltd., Ystradgynlais, Swansea
- Richard Henry Linnell, Factory Superintendent, British Thomson-Houston Company, Ltd., Leicester
- Leonard Edmund Reuben Loader, Chief Officer, Anglesey Fire Brigade
- Albert William Lovelock, Development and Production Manager, S. G. Brown, Ltd. Watford
- Reginald Lowen, Establishment Officer, National Maritime Museum
- George Joseph Lunnon, Senior Executive Officer, Colonial Office
- William Arthur McAdam MC Commandant, Metropolitan Special Constabulary
- Anne Montgomery MacArthur, Headmistress, Coleridge Road Secondary Modern School for Girls, Sheffield
- Annie McCallum. For political services in Glasgow.
- Edith Margaret McClintock, Superintendent of Typists, Supreme Court of Judicature, Northern Ireland
- Doris McDonald, Honorary Secretary, Street Savings Group, South Shields, and Chairman, South Shields Street Groups Sub-Committee
- James MacGregor, Works' Manager, Thermotank, Ltd., Glasgow
- Bernard McGuirk, Manager, Liverpool (Leece Street) Employment Exchange, Ministry of Labour and National Service
- Lieutenant-Commander Robert Mckellar RD RNR (Retired), Captain Superintendent, National Sea Training Schools, Gravesend
- Elizabeth Fotheringham Mckie, Principal, Logan and Johnstone Pre-Nursing College, Glasgow
- Thomas McLauchlan MC Chief Traffic Superintendent, North Eastern Region, General Post Office
- Kenneth Macleod, Superintendent and Deputy Chief Constable. Renfrew and Bute Constabulary
- Gordon McLoughlin, Senior Executive Officer, National Debt Office
- Euphemia MacMillan, Matron. Dunclutha Children's Home, Kirn, Argyll
- Norman McNeilly, Principal, Boys' Model Primary School, Belfast
- David Henry McVeigh, District Manager, Lincoln District, Road Haulage Executive. For services during the recent floods in the Eastern Counties.
- Leonard Emile Magnusson, Senior Executive Engineer, General Post Office
- Thomas Walter Marchant, Higher Executive Officer, Ministry of Supply
- Richard Harry Wakeling Marks, Member, Devonport Local Committee of the Royal Naval Benevolent Trust
- Florence Marsden, Member, Hull Savings Committee
- Albert William John Martin, Accountant, Ministry of Fuel and Power
- Frederick Martin, Deputy Clerk of the Crown and Peace, Belfast and County Antrim
- Leonard Frank Martin, Manager, Government Shipping Department, Hogg Robinson and Capel-Cure, Ltd.
- William Martin JP Member, National Union of Agricultural Workers
- Elsie Maskell, Clerical Assistant, Board of Trade
- John Patrick Matthews, Maintenance Master, R.A.S.C. Fleet, Sheerness. For services during the recent floods in the Eastern Counties.
- Florrie Wright Maxim, lately Ward Sister, Birch Hill Hospital, Rochdale, Lancashire
- Herbert George Maybury, Records Officer, Imperial War Graves Commission
- Percy William Bell Mayes JP Chairman, Erith Local Employment Committee
- Florence Mary Mears, Senior Executive Officer, General Post Office
- Francis Arnold Meldrum, Area Engineer, Telephone Manager's Office, Liverpool, General Post Office
- Charles Percival Menday, Food Executive Officer, Ministry of Food
- Alexander Mennie DCM Chairman, Glasgow Central Disablement Advisory Committee
- John Harold Middleton, Secretary of the Civil Service Sports Council
- Robert Headley Miers, Drainage Engineer, Ministry of Agriculture and Fisheries. For services during the recent floods in the Eastern Counties.
- Ronald Mildenhall, Higher Executive Officer, H.M. Treasury
- Celia Blair Miller, Joint Honorary Secretary, Henley and District Housing Trust
- William Alexander Pyper Milne Area Cold Storage Officer, Ministry of Food
- Alderman Henry Rawson Milner, Chairman, Bridlington Youth Employment Committee
- Observer Commander Frank William Mitchell, Deputy Commandant, Southern Area, Royal Observer Corps
- John Christopher Morgan, Chairman, Atcham District Committee, Salop Agricultural Executive Committee
- Percy Morrell, lately Generation Engineer (Operation), Northern Group, British Electricity Authority
- Frank Moss, Maintenance Superintendent, Garringtons, Ltd., Darleston
- John Frederick Michael Mowat JP For political and public services in Wrexham.
- Edward Arthur Moxey, Chief Officer, Great Yarmouth Fire Brigade
- George Frederick Mullinger, Surveyor, Grade I, Ministry of Agriculture and Fisheries
- Robert Charles Mundy, Bulk Contracts Manager, Ericsson Telephones Ltd.
- Margaret Macartney Murray, Matron, Herrison (Mental) Hospital, Dorchester, Dorset
- Captain Alexander Naismtth, Master, M.V. Anshun, China Navigation Company, Ltd.
- John Henry Naylor, District Commercial Engineer, Barnsley District, Yorkshire Electricity Board
- John Rowan Nesbit, Chief Cashier and Head Office Manager, Scottish Omnibuses, Ltd.
- Observer Commander Herbert George Newman, Commandant, No. 15 Group, Royal Observer Corps, Cambridge
- Winifred Curtis Nichols, Senior Executive Officer, Office of the Public Trustee
- William John Northmore, lately General Foreman of Works, Admiralty
- Evelyn Jessie Blackett-Ord, National Vice-Chairman. Women's Section. British Legion
- Edward William James Osborne BEM Chief Superintendent, Metropolitan Police Force
- Joseph Aloysius Vincent O'Shea, Clerical Officer, Board of Trade
- William Kingdon Owen JP Chairman, Neath Juvenile Advisory Committee
- Edith Annie Parker JP For political and public services in Salford.
- Carl Pater Parkinson, Skipper of the Fishing Vessel Apt
- Louis Emanuel Parsons, Senior Experimental Officer, British Museum (Natural History)
- Samuel John Partridge, County Welfare Officer, East Riding of Yorkshire. For services during the recent floods in the Eastern Counties.
- Hubert Newton Peake, Chairman, Banbury Committee, Air Training Corps
- Bertram Wilson Pearce, Temporary Clerk, Grade I, Ministry of Works
- William Donald Pearce, Superintendent of Works, Office of the Receiver for Metropolitan Police
- Frank Pearson, Manager, Heavy Duty Cooking Apparatus Department, Wm. Green and Company (Ecclesfield), Ltd., Sheffield
- William Henry Pearson JP Kent County Organiser, National Union of Agricultural Workers
- Isabella Agnes Pettitt, Assistant Honorary Secretary, Essex, Soldiers, Sailors and Airmen's Families Association. For services during the recent floods in the Eastern Counties.
- Geoffrey Elisha Phillippo, Clerk to the Lincolnshire River Board. For services during the recent floods in the Eastern Counties.
- Melbourne Griffith Phillips, Superintendent, Bristol City Police Force
- Sydney Pitt JP Headmaster, Russell Scott County Primary School, Denton, Lancashire
- Cyril Marks Plowman, Adviser to the Industrial Relations Committee of the Gas Council
- Lilian Alice Plowman, Grade 4 Officer, Ministry of Labour and National Service
- Robert George Pointer, Manager, Mile Cross Silk Mills, Francis Hinde and Sons, Ltd., Norwich
- Aubrey Franklyn Pool, Employer Member, Cornwall District Advisory Committee, South Western Regional Board for Industry
- George Arthur Henry Edward Poole, Factory Manager, Joseph Lucas, Ltd., Birmingham
- James Arthur Porter. For political and public services in Liverpool.
- Isabel Muriel Potts. For political and public services in Middlesex.
- Ernest Baden Powell, Honorary Secretary, Brecon and District Savings Committee, South Wales
- Ronald Rees Powell MRCS LRCP Chairman, Reigate Unit Committee, and Southern Area Representative, Sea Cadet Council
- Stanley Prissick, Director and Secretary, Henry Scarr, Ltd., Hessle, East Yorkshire
- Phyllis Mary Helen Pritchard, County Organiser, Lindsey, Women's Voluntary Services. For services during the recent floods in the Eastern Counties.
- Edith May Hedley-Prole, Centre Organiser, Lambeth, Women's Voluntary Services
- Margaret Joan Pryer, Higher Executive Officer, H.M. Treasury
- John Herbert Quayle, Divisional Engineer, Lincolnshire River Board. For services during the recent floods in the Eastern Counties.
- George Frederick Quilter, Brigade Secretary, St. John Ambulance Brigade
- Joseph Rea, Divisional Officer, Wiltshire Fire Service
- Iden Robert Reed, London Outdoor Representative, Passenger Department, Cunard Steamship Company, Ltd.
- John Reginald Reed, Branch Accountant and Office Manager, English Electric Company, Ltd., Preston
- Harry Hepburn Reid JP Headmaster, St. Helena Boys' Secondary Modern School, Colchester
- James Reid. For political and public services in Dumfries-shire.
- James Ernest Reid, District Inspector, Royal Ulster Constabulary
- Herbert Pinder Reynolds, Head Postmaster, Weymouth, Dorset, General Post Office
- Arthur Richards, Chief Draughtsman, Admiralty
- George Tilghman Richards, Senior Research Assistant, Science Museum
- John William Rigby, Staff Officer, Board of Inland Revenue
- Ernest Armstrong Ritchie, Traffic Superintendent, Belfast Corporation Transport Department
- Chambers Edward Ritson, Member, North West Area Seedcrushers' Committee
- Austin Horace Cecil Roberts, Senior Executive Officer, Charity Commission
- Frank Roberts, Cleansing Superintendent, Birkenhead County Borough
- Thomas Herbert Roberts, Higher Executive Officer, War Office
- Robina Robertson, Superintendent, District Nurses' Association, Londonderry
- Donald Goodall Roper, Higher Executive Officer, Ministry of Agriculture and Fisheries
- Oswald Stafford Rose, Agricultural Development Officer to the British Sugar Corporation
- Alexandrina Ross, Nursing Sister, Casualty Ward and Radiotherapy Ward, Glasgow Royal Infirmary
- Jeannette Susannah Gertrude Rowe, Honorary Secretary, Schools Savings Committee, Belfast
- William Francis Rowland JP For political and public services in Glamorgan.
- Ivor Robertson Roy, Column Officer, South Eastern Area Fire Brigade, Scotland
- Francis Walter Ruzbridge, Chief Clerk, South Eastern Divisional Road Engineer's Office, Ministry of Transport
- Ralph Ernest Sadler, Assistant Engineer (New Works), Eastern Region, Railway Executive
- Reginald Dennis Salmon, Chief Development Engineer, Creed and Company, Ltd.
- Ethel Alice Sampson, Matron, Old People's Home, The Laurels, Oxford
- Mary Bell Sanderson, Honorary Secretary, Women's Voluntary Services, Scotland
- Alice Ada Saville, Technical Nursing Officer, Reading Nursing Appointments Office, Ministry of Labour and National Service
- James Watson Scholes JP Chairman, Dumfriesshire Savings Committee
- Alfred Edward Scott, Assistant Regional Manager, London North-West Regional Office, Central Land Board and War Damage Commission
- Alfred Trotter Scott, Honorary Secretary, Ayr and South Ayrshire Committee, St. Andrew's Ambulance Association
- Dorothy Edith Scott, Chief Superintendent of Typists, Ministry of Materials
- Harry Neill Scott, Manager, Outside Engineering Department. Harland and Wolff, Ltd., Glasgow
- Arthur Richard Sculthorpe, General Secretary, National Deaf-Blind Helpers' League
- Isabel Frances Teresa Shallcrass, Higher Executive Officer, Ministry of Education
- Frank Hamblyn Sharpe, Inspector of Taxes (Higher Grade). Board of Inland Revenue
- William Shaw, Flax Grader, Ministry of Materials
- Francis Ernest Shippobotham, Manager, Claims Department, Western Welsh Omnibus Company, Ltd.
- Mary Elizabeth Short JP Alderman, East Suffolk County Council and Eye Borough Council
- Donald George Henry Simmonds, Principal Cost Officer, War Office
- Abe Simpson, Divisional Officer, Fife Area Fire Brigade
- Margaret Beryl Skelly, Private Secretary to the Rt. Hon. C. R. Attlee OM CH MP For political services.
- Henry Atkinson Slater. For political and public services in Lancashire.
- Beatrice Emma Slocombe. For political and public services in Keighley.
- Madeline Small. For political and public services in Belfast.
- Captain Albert Smedley DCM Secretary, Civil Defence Technical Training School, Taymouth Castle, Perthshire
- Charles Smith, Senior Sales Executive, Cooper and Roe, Ltd.
- Elsie Emma Margaret Smith, Superintendent, Metropolitan Women Police
- Everitt Barnard Smith, Skipper of the Fishing Vessel Sir Lancelot
- Frederick William Stephen Smith, Senior Executive Officer, Ministry of Food
- Jessie Gladys Smith, Assistant Secretary and Treasurer, Fulham and Hammer-smith Division, Soldiers', Sailors' and Airmen's Families Association
- Mabel Georgina Smith, Headmistress, Longford Park Open Air School, Stretford
- Thomas Alfred Smith, Chief Engineer, Alley and MacLellan, Ltd., Glasgow
- Walter Wilson Smith, Chief Technician, Plastic Surgery Department, Ballochmyle Hospital, Ayrshire
- Joseph James John Smythe, Non-Technical Grade I, Royal Ordnance Factory, Swynnerton
- Jeannie Spence, Vice-President, Dundee and District Union of Jute and Flax Workers
- William Harry Spice, Control Officer, Grade I, British Mission to Soviet Occupation Forces in Germany
- Ernest Francis Spillan, Telecommunications Technical Officer I, Ministry of Civil Aviation
- Frank Edward Grant Spokes, Senior Executive Officer, No. 25 Maintenance Unit, Royal Air Force, Hartlebury
- Charles Mervyn Stanford, Executive Officer, Central Office of Information
- Bertram Dean Stanley, Secretary and Accountant. East Kent Road Car Company, Ltd.
- James Dawson Steel, Chief Area Milk Officer, Scotland, Ministry of Food
- Muriel Emia Stephens, Postmistress, Pontnewydd Sub-Post Office (S), Newport, Monmouthshire
- Thomas Stephenson, Senior Executive Officer, Scottish Education Department
- Betty Ellen May Stern, Welfare Member. Women's Voluntary Services, Korea
- Donald Arnott Stewart, Consulting Engineer. For services to the Ministry of Works.
- George Alexander Stewart, Assistant Secretary and Librarian, Royal Society of Edinburgh
- James Ramsay Stirling, Higher Executive Officer, Ministry of Food
- Sarah Story. For political and public services in Newcastle upon Tyne.
- George Burder Stratton, Librarian. Zoological Society of London
- John William Strydom, Cashier, The Vacuum Oil Company, Ltd., Coryton Refinery. For services during the recent floods in the Eastern Counties.
- Nina Edith Sturdee, lately Personal Private Secretary to the Prime Minister
- Margaret Hilda Talbot. For political and public services in Preston.
- Sidney Cyril Tarry, Chairman, St. Dunstan's Physiotherapy Advisory Committee
- Cyril Balfour Taylor. For political and public services in Kingston-upon-Hull.
- Frances Mary Graham-Taylor. For political and public services in Wessex.
- James Ingram Taylor, Deputy Chief Engineer, Kent River Board. For services during the recent floods in the Eastern Counties.
- Samuel Ewart Taylor, Deputy Principal Officer, Ministry of Health and Local Government, Northern Ireland
- Henry Thomas JP Chairman, Barry and Penarth Joint Food Control Committee
- Margaret Louisie Thomas, Alderman, County Borough Organiser, Wakefield, Women's Voluntary Services
- William Albert Thomas, Honorary Secretary, Pontardulais Choral Society, South Wales
- Captain William Evan Thomas JP Member, Pembroke County Agricultural Executive Committee
- Annie Nicol Thompson, Lady Superintendent
- Charles Thompson's Mission, Birkenhead
- George Thompson, District Secretary for Canada and the United States of America, National Union of Seamen
- John Seymour Thompson, Chief Metallurgist and Production Manager, Durham Chemicals, Ltd., Birtley
- Mary Elizabeth Thomson, County Organiser, Fife. Women's Voluntary Services
- William Henry Tichbon, Chief Inspector, British Overseas Airways Corporation
- Augusta Annie Tomlinson, Methodist Welfare Worker, Middle East Land Forces
- Captain Philip Henry Trimmer DSO Royal Navy (Retired), Honorary Secretary, Guildford Unit Committee, Sea Cadet Corps
- Helen Millicent Troup, Social Worker, Edinburgh
- Stanley Christopher Tucker, Higher Executive Officer, Board of Inland Revenue
- David Tudor JP For political and public services in North Wales.
- Raymond Tuft, Divisional Superintendent, Leicester Division, Birmingham and Midland Motor Omnibus Company, Ltd.
- Henry Turner, Foundry Manager, International Combustion, Ltd., Derby
- Nelly Turner, Works Manageress, E. Ulingworth and Company, Ltd., Suttonin-Ashfield
- Janie Tweed, lately Honorary Secretary, Larne Music Festival Association
- Louie Tweedy JP County Borough Organiser, Tynemouth, Women's Voluntary Services
- Francis George Valentine Vincent, Plant Engineer, Supermarine Works, Vickers-Armstrongs, Ltd., Swindon
- James Eric Vine, Intelligence Officer, War Office
- Charles George Vokes, Senior Executive Officer, War Office
- Grace Mary Wacey, Secretary, University of London Institute of Education
- George Benjamin James Wadley, Higher Executive Officer, Admiralty
- Doris Walker, Controller of Typists (Outstations), Air Ministry
- John William Walker, Senior Executive Officer, Air Ministry
- James Wallbey. For public services in Penclawdd, Glamorganshire.
- Fanny Walwyn, Higher Executive Officer, Commonwealth Relations Office
- Catherine Waterhouse, Domiciliary Midwife, King's Lynn, Norfolk
- Doris Prudence Waters, Head of Old People's Welfare Department, Women's Voluntary Services
- Dilys Mary Francis-Watkins, Higher Executive Officer, Office of H.M. Procurator General and Treasury Solicitor
- Fred Akeroyd Watson, Senior Executive Officer, Ministry of Pensions
- John Smith Watson, Chief Sanitary Inspector and Housing Officer, Border Rural District Council
- Stanley Gordon Strange Watts, Accountant, Board of Customs and Excise
- Edwin Webb, Secretary-Manager, Church of England Soldiers', Sailors' and Airmen's Institute, Aldershot
- Charles Thomas Webster, Senior Experimental Officer, Joint Fire Research Organisation, Department of Scientific and Industrial Research
- Edward Marshall Wells, Assistant Principal Clerk, Board of Inland Revenue
- Alba Gladys Ivy Colchester-Wemyss, Borough Organiser, Chesterfield, Women's Voluntary Services
- Francis West, Skipper of the Motor Drifter Honeydew
- Thomas Whalley, Chairman, Northwich Savings Committee, Cheshire
- Vernon Whitaker, Senior Technical Superintendent (Engineer), No. 10 Maintenance Unit, Royal Air Force, Hullavington
- John Thomas Wiggans, Station Master, Manchester (Victoria, Exchange and Salford), Railway Executive
- David Watkin Williams, Chief Executive Officer, Wales Region, Ministry of Fuel and Power
- Frank Williams, Vice-Chairman, Chesterfield and District Local Employment Committee
- George Richard Williams, Clerical Officer, Ministry of National Insurance
- Major Conrad Thomas Wilson, Branch Secretary, Officers' Association
- Esther Wilson, Honorary Assistant Secretary, Carlisle Savings Committee
- Frank Baxter Wilson, Technical Adviser, Guest, Keen and Nettlefolds (Midlands), Ltd., Darlaston
- Arthur Edgar John Wood, Higher Executive Officer, Ministry of Fuel and Power
- Dorothy Rose Wood, Assistant, Music Department, British Broadcasting Corporation
- Frederick George Wood, Headmaster, South Benfleet Primary School. For services during the recent floods in the Eastern Counties.
- Gwendolin Blanche Wood, lately County Officer, St. John Ambulance Brigade, Nottinghamshire
- Frank Cecil Woolcott, Senior Executive Officer, Office of H.M. Procurator General and Treasury Solicitor
- Leopold Adrian Worswick, Vice-Chairman, Barnstaple Local Employment Committee
- Charles Cowley Worters, Secretary, Hire Purchase Trade. Association
- Ernest Wright, Higher Executive Officer, Scottish Home Department
- Daniel Llewelyn Wynn, Slaughterhouse Agent, North Eastern Area, Ministry of Food

Diplomatic Service and Overseas List

- Syed Sager Ali, Accountant at Her Majesty's Embassy in Bangkok
- Harold Blood, Deputy Assistant Civil Secretary (Personnel), Sudan Government
- Ernest Thomas Castro, lately British Pro-Consul at Malaga
- John Christie, British subject resident in Uruguay
- Leslie Clarke, lately Temporary Assistant, Control Commission for Germany (British Element)
- Robert Arthur Clarke, Superintendent of Police, Tripoli, Western Province, Libya
- Charles Levinge Clayton MC Travel Officer at Her Majesty's Consulate-General at New York
- Judith Mary Cotton, Personal Secretary to Her Majesty's Ambassador in Athens
- Norman Matthew Darbyshire, Attached to the British Middle East Office
- Walter Victor Deacock, Second Secretary at Her Majesty's Embassy in Paris
- Arthur George Dovey, British subject resident in Chile
- John Spenser Ritchie Duncan, Deputy Assistant Civil Secretary (Political), Sudan Government
- Edward George Dunckley, Executive Officer, Control Commission for Germany (British Element)
- Henry Fletcher Ellis, British subject lately resident in Egypt
- Jack Evans, Acting Director General of Forestry, Iraq Government
- Hector Ernest Floridia, British subject resident in Egypt
- Samuel Fullman, Senior Temporary Assistant, Information Services Division, Control Commission for Germany (British Element)
- Ada Louisa Gulliver, Medical Missionary of the Bible Churchmen's Missionary Society resident in Burma
- Jessie Harvey, British subject resident in Denmark
- Arthur Cyril Walter Hayday, lately Trade Officer, Department of Economics and Trade, Sudan Government
- Barbara Hayes, Head of the Speakers' Section, British Information Services, New York
- Margaret Kate Henry, Archivist at Her Majesty's Embassy in Santiago
- Arthur Jean Janssens, Her Majesty's Vice-Consul at Antwerp
- Miriam Jennings, British subject resident in the Argentine Republic
- Mannfield Blanche Johnston, Typist at Her Majesty's Embassy in Peking
- Albert Thomas Lamb DFC lately Third Secretary at Her Majesty's Legation in Bucharest
- Federigo Lelli, British Pro-Consul at Florence
- John Lumsden, Her Majesty's Vice-Consul at Casablanca
- The Reverend Father Michael Joseph Mceleney, lately Senior Roman Catholic Chaplain to the Control Commission for Germany (British Element)
- Elizabeth Susan Olive Parsons, lately Clerical Officer at Her Majesty's Embassy in Tehran
- Major Eric Pritchard, Superintendent of Prisons in Tripolitama, Libya
- Frederick Ricks, lately Inspector of Water Supply, Public Works Department, Sudan Government
- Lucy Hilda Rowcliffe, British subject resident in France
- Charles Bertram Longmore Ryland, General Manager of the Western Telegraph Company Limited, Porto Alegre
- Thomas Albert Frederick Savile Stamper, Secretary, Sudan Government Agency in London
- Onslow Joseph John Tuckley, Functional Officer, British Council, Egypt
- Kenneth Douglas Whitmarsh, Senior Temporary Assistant, Control Commission for Germany (British Element)

Colonies, Protectorates, etc

- George Patten Adams, of Westbury, State of Tasmania. For services to philanthropic and charitable movements.
- Isobel Mary Carter, Secretary of the Three Services Entertainment Committee in Calcutta, India
- Alexander Cave, Officer in Charge of the Fire Rescue Services attached to the Kolar Gold Field Mining Companies in Southern India
- Lionel Deary, General Secretary, Mine Workers' Union, Southern Rhodesia
- Frank Robert Dowse, Superintendent of Reserves, Launceston City Council, State of Tasmania
- Margaret Bryden Fearn. For services to women's welfare organisations in Umtali, Southern Rhodesia.
- George Dennis Augustine Fitzgerald, Honorary Treasurer, Karachi Branch. United Kingdom Association in Pakistan
- Kenneth Harold Greager, Chief Engineer, Central African Airways, Southern Rhodesia
- George Louis Harvey. For services to the United Kingdom community in Bangalore, India.
- Josie Herbst. For social welfare services in Fort Victoria, Southern Rhodesia.
- Rachel Hlazo. For social welfare services to the African women of Southern Rhodesia.
- Christine Barclay Hoole. For services to the Red Cross Society in Southern Rhodesia.
- Helen Louisa Hubbard. For services to the Memorable Order of Tin Hats Women's Association (Mothwas) in Southern Rhodesia
- Enid Frances Jones, Secretary of the Church of England Advisory Council of Empire Settlement
- Katherine Isabel Kewley, Matron of the Lady Victoria Buxton Girls' Club, State of South Australia
- Johanna Sophia Klopper, a school teacher in the Bechuanaland Protectorate
- Mary Evangelist Lamp, of Launceston, State of Tasmania. For social welfare services.
- Mary Julia Lawes. For services to the Red Cross in the State of South Australia.
- Raymond Bernhard Leonard. For services rendered under the auspices of the Bombay European Relief Association.
- Juliet Kathleen Maccaw. For services rendered in Calcutta under the auspices of the East India Charitable Trust.
- Mabel Gertrude MacGowan, Confidential Secretary to the Director-General, and the Chairman of the Central Council, of the Over-Seas League
- Catherine McLaren. For social welfare services to the United Kingdom community in Lahore and elsewhere in the Punjab.
- Philadelphia Margaret Noakes, Commissioner for Training, Girl Guides Association, Southern Rhodesia
- Ida Josephine Isabell Norton. For social welfare services, especially to the Royal Hobart Hospital, State of Tasmania
- Samuel Alexander Bernard Polglase, Chairman of the East Pakistan Branch of the United Kingdom Association m Pakistan
- The Reverend David Leslie Scott, Principal of Murray College, Sialkot, Pakistan
- Leslie Hart Stewart, Secretary, Natural Resources Board, Southern Rhodesia
- Albert Baden Thompson, a prominent Trade Unionist, and a member of the Board of Management of the State Bank, in the State of South Australia
- Henry John Ranger Tyrrell. For services to charitable organisations in Southern Rhodesia.
- Benjamin Watkins. For public and philanthropic services in the State of Tasmania.
- Cecil Hobart Webster. For services to patriotic and philanthropic organisations in the State of Tasmania.
- Ernest Kynaston Weeden. For services to the National Youth Council and the Holiday Association, Southern Rhodesia.

Colonial Service

- Albert Robert Allen, Emergency Administrative Officer (Resettlement Officer), Federation of Malaya
- James Robert Norton-Amor, Clerk to the Justices, Registrar of Births, Deaths and Marriages, Gibraltar
- Rupert Stanley Bastin, lately Chief Wireless Officer, Gilbert and Ellice Islands
- Henry Herbert Brazier, Chief Computer, Directorate of Colonial Surveys
- Frederick James Broadway. For public services in St. Helena.
- Dillet Hartman Burrows, Commissioner, Georgetown, Exuma, Bahamas
- Mona Eileen Byer. For services to the Girl Guide Movement in the Windward Islands
- Ruth Camplin. For nursing services in Uganda.
- Terence Ashton Dupont Clarke, Headmaster, Wesley Hall Junior School, Barbados
- The Reverend Erasmus William Benjamin Cole. For services to education in Sierra Leone.
- James Walter Collins, Water Superintendent, Public Works Department, Kenya
- Alfred Curmi, Executive Officer, Malta
- Wallestine Godwin Dako, Senior Collector of Customs and Excise, Gold Coast
- Victor Akintunde Davies, Accountant, Public Works Department, Nigeria
- Dorothy Delbridge For medical services in Fiji.
- Patrick Joseph Dominique, Senior Agricultural Assistant, Trinidad
- Edward John Downes, Superintendent of Public Gardens, Jamaica
- Philippe Dupavillon, Manager and Secretary to the Tobacco Board, Mauritius
- Bessie Mary East. For services to education in Tanganyika.
- Claude Anthony Eber, Architect, Federation of Malaya
- Edwin Edgar Eusey. For public services in Belize, British Honduras.
- Doris Mary Evans, Queen Elizabeth's Colonial Nursing Service, Principal Matron, Nigeria
- Rosamond Arorunkah Fowlis, Domestic Science Organiser, Gambia
- Douglas Francis Fromings. For services to the Tobacco industry, Nyasaland
- Percy Richard Fuller, Establishment Officer, Northern Rhodesia
- William Peter Gaskell. For services to the Boy Scout Movement in Nigeria
- Leslie Francis Gill. For public services in the British Solomon Islands.
- Major Goh Guan Hop, E.D. For public services in the Federation of Malaya.
- Christoffel Goosen. For services to the Trade Union Movement in Northern Rhodesia
- Eleanora Minnie Hall, Queen Elizabeth's Colonial Nursing Service, Matron, Tanganyika
- Jessie Cameron Hallett. For public services and social work in Bermuda.
- James Martin Hallpike, Chief Sanitary Inspector, Antigua, Leeward Islands
- Keith Jefferson Henderson, Colonial Administrative Service, Secretary for Chinese Affairs, Penang, Federation of Malaya
- Major Sydney William Kenwood, Director of Music, British Guiana Militia Band
- Osmond John Ward-Horner, Postmaster, Seychelles
- Ramadan Jemil. For public services in Cyprus.
- Albert Jillott, Superintendent of Prisons, Hong Kong
- Edward Jones, Chief Inspector of Works, Nigeria
- William Bertram Arnold Joost Keppel, Operations Officer, Department of Civil Aviation, Nigeria
- Hubert Forrester Knowles, Superintendent, Bahamas General Hospital
- Ahmed Abdulrasul Mohamed Lakha Kanji. For public services in Zanzibar.
- Costas Charalambus Lap As, Inspector of Elementary Schools (Greek), Cyprus
- James Wilfred Leach, Colonial Administrative Service, Assistant District Officer, Nigeria
- Leung Fung Ki, Education Officer, Hong Kong
- Li Chik-Nung, Assistant Social Welfare Officer, Hong Kong
- Kenneth Denham Lloyd, Education Officer, Somaliland
- Edward Jackson McCormack, Assistant Master and Registrar, Supreme Court, Sierra Leone
- Joseph Darnley Maloney, Administrative Officer and Magistrate, Anguilla, Leeward Islands
- Lieutenant-Colonel Ernest Marston. For public services in Kenya.
- Clare Elizabeth Lumsden Milne, Headmistress, Government English Preparatory School, Muar, Federation of Malaya
- Clarence Michael Miranda, Telephone Engineer, Posts and Telephones Department, Aden
- Albert Edward Monteiro, Chief Clerk, Chief Accountant's Department, Singapore Harbour Board
- Marjorie Helen Murray. For services to education in Kenya
- James Stevenson Nelson, Establishment Officer, East African Posts and Telecommunications Administration
- Ambrose Michael Ofafa. For public services in Kenya.
- Alfred Olajide, Assistant Secretary, Nigeria
- Henry Arthur Oliver, Colonial Administrative Service. Administrative Officer. Gambia
- Anthony Pape. For public services in Kenya.
- Chaturbhai Khushalbhai Patel. For public and welfare services in Tanganyika.
- William Oliver Petrie Colonial Medical Service, Medical Officer, Nyasaland
- William Durham Petty, Fire Chief, Hamilton Volunteer Fire Brigade, Bermuda
- Albert Russell Games Prosser, Assistant Director (Mass Education and Community Development), Gold Coast
- Sanmugan Ramalingam, lately Technical Assistant, Survey Department, Singapore
- Ramjuttan Ramdass, Assistant Commissioner of Income Tax, Mauritius
- Christina Agnes Séguin. For services to education in Northern Rhodesia.
- Joseph Kenneth Shepherd, Superintendent, Buildings, Prisons Department, Uganda
- Soo Hoy Mun Honorary Medical Officer, Chinese Maternity Hospital, Federation of Malaya
- Arthur Dudley Soutar JP Principal Assistant Secretary, Secretariat, Jamaica
- Annette Irene Greer Spence, Colonial Education Service, Education Officer, Nigeria
- Myra Annie Elizabeth-Spurr. For services to education in Uganda.
- Charles Payne Sutcliffe, Colonial Police Service, Assistant Superintendent of Police, Tanganyika
- Datu Abang Abu Talip-bin Datu Abang Haji Buassan. For public services in Sarawak.
- William Richardson Tatem JP For public services in the Turks and Caicos Islands.
- Eileen Urich. For social welfare work in Trinidad.
- Elizabeth Affuah Vanderpuye, Health Officer, Red Cross Society, Gold Coast
- John Voon Yin Kui, lately Chief Clerk, Resident's Office, Jesselton, North Borneo
- Vythilingam Sithambaram V'Thaver, lately Financial Assistant, Medical Headquarters, Penang, Federation of Malaya
- Claude Hamilton Walcott, Harbourmaster, British Guiana
- Florence Mary Walker. For services to education in Nyasaland.
- Wallace Wynter Warden JP For public services in Fiji.
- Ernest Philip Wharton, Deputy Inspector of Stores, Office of the Crown Agents for the Colonies
- Herbert Whittaker, Assistant Engineer, Civil Engineering Department, Office of the Crown Agents for the Colonies
- Dunstan Matthew William, Telegraph Inspector, North Borneo
- Vincent Bpwen Williams. For social services in Barbados.
- Gerald Hugh Wilson, Director, Northern Rhodesia and Nyasaland Publications Bureau
- Leonie Mary Wright. For public and social services in British Honduras.
- Felix Durocher-Yvon, lately Director of Agriculture, Seychelles, now Agricultural Officer, Northern Rhodesia
- Haji Zahwi Bin Haji Musa, Headman in Mukah and Chairman, Mixed Local Authority, Sarawak
- Elias Zammit. For public services in Malta.

Honorary Members

- Seiyid Umar Al Mihdhar Bin Alawi Al Kaf. For public services in the Aden Protectorate.
- Thong Jin Hin. For public services in the Federation of Malaya.
- Dato Kamaruddin Bin Haji Ibrahim, Territorial Chief, Ulu Selangor, Federation of Malaya
- Mohamed Yusoff Bin Ahmad. For public services in the Federation of Malaya.
- Abdul Majid Bin Haji Mohamed Shahid, Assistant Conservator of Forests, Federation of Malaya
- Ahmadu, Emir of Misau, Nigeria
- The Reverend Amos Sodunola Solarin. For social and welfare services in Nigeria.
- Jacob Maduegbunam Onyechi, Assistant Secretary (Finance), Nigeria
- Effiong Etim Ekeng, Health Superintendent, Nigeria
- Ignatius Alexander Arudimma Idigbe, Administrative Assistant, Nigeria
- Chief Henry Ekpo Enyenihi, Chairman, Eket County Council, Nigeria
- Michael Eledumo Ojomo, Senior Registrar, Supreme Court of Nigeria
- Afotanju Ogedegbe, lately Auditor, Nigeria
- James Theophilus Ayodele Dixon, Assistant Superintendent of Police, Nigeria
- Bai Koblo, Paramount Chief, Marampa, Sierra Leone
- Mohamoud Ali Shirreh, Senior Akil of the Warsangeli tribe, Somaliland
- Haji Bahanan Hersi. For services to the Local Government in Somaliland.
- Besweri Kisalita Mulyanti, lately Saza Chief of Kyaggwe, Uganda
- Alexander Kironde, Saza Chief of Buddu County, Uganda
- Zefania Nabikamba, County Chief, Bugabula, Busoga, Uganda
- Matayo Lamot, Lawirwodi, Uganda
- Yovani Kiwanuka, Clerk of Works, Kigezi African Local Government, Uganda

=== Order of the Companions of Honour (CH) ===
- Edward Benjamin Britten, Composer
- The Right Honourable James Chuter Ede JP DL MP, Labour Member of Parliament for Mitcham, 1923, and for South Shields, 1929–31 and since 1935. Secretary of State for the Home Department, 1945–51; Leader of the House of Commons, March–October 1951. For political and public services.
- Lieutenant-Colonel Sir (William Jocelyn) Ian Fraser CBE MP, Unionist Member of Parliament for Morecambe and Lonsdale since 1950; for Lonsdale, 1940–50; and for North St. Pancras, 1924–29 and 1931–36. Chairman, Executive Council of St. Dunstan's since 1921. National President of British Legion since 1947. For political and public services.
- The Right Honourable Thomas Johnston. For public services in Scotland.

=== Royal Victorian Medals ===
==== Silver ====
- Richard Clement Allenby
- Percival Frank Ash
- George Henry Bignell
- Robert Bissett
- Charles Henry Brown
- Leopold Isaac Noah Brown
- Alfred James Cole
- Thomas Fraser
- Edward Victor Greener
- Stanley Edgar Hooks
- Stanley William Lionel Rivers Lucking
- Ernest George Moffat
- Jessie Wilson Massie Robertson
- William Robson
- Joseph Charles Shefford
- Sidney Albert Spong
- Edwin Stuart
- William Urquhart
- Inspector Ronald Douglas Wells, Metropolitan Police
- Beatrice Anne Williams

=== Queen's Commendations for Valuable Service in the Air ===
- Captain Richard Rymer, Training Captain, Viscount Flight, British European Airways
- Acting Group Captain Richard Irvin Knight Edwards DFC AFC Royal Air Force
- Wing Commander John Barraclough DFC AFC Royal Air Force
- Squadron Leader Derek Clare DFC Royal Air Force
- Squadron Leader Harold Cecil Flemons, Royal Air Force
- Squadron Leader Stanley Richard Hodge, Royal Air Force
- Squadron Leader Henry William Lamond, Royal Air Force
- Squadron Leader Alastair Cavendish Lindsay Mackie DFC Royal Air Force
- Squadron Leader William John McLean DSO DFC AFC Royal Air Force
- Squadron Leader Philip Richard Robinson, Royal Air Force
- Acting Squadron Leader Kenneth Barnes, Royal Air Force
- Acting Squadron Leader Robert Anthony Carson MC Royal Air Force
- Flight Lieutenant Barry Nigel Byrne, Royal Air Force
- Flight Lieutenant Arthur Frederick Carvosso, Royal Air Force
- Flight Lieutenant James Leslie Stuart Crawford, Royal Air Force
- Flight Lieutenant William Snowdon Douglas, Royal Air Force
- Flight Lieutenant William Edwards, Royal Air Force
- Flight Lieutenant John Horrobin Elliott, Royal Air Force
- Flight Lieutenant Thomas Philip Fargher DFC Royal Air Force
- Flight Lieutenant Mane Feldman, Royal Air Force
- Flight Lieutenant Ernest Derek Glaser DFC Royal Air Force
- Flight Lieutenant Caryl Ramsay Gordon, Royal Air Force
- Flight Lieutenant James Nicoll Gracie, Royal Air Force
- Flight Lieutenant Robert McConnell Hamilton, Royal Air Force
- Flight Lieutenant Robert Herrick, Royal Air Force (Deceased)
- Flight Lieutenant Paul Albert Hunt, Royal Air Force
- Flight Lieutenant Ian Richard Iddison, Royal Air Force
- Flight Lieutenant Justin Michael McCann, Royal Air Force
- Flight Lieutenant Thomas Walter Monaghan, Royal Air Force
- Flight Lieutenant Horatio Ogilvie, Royal Air Force Reserve of Officers
- Flight Lieutenant James Ernest Petty, Royal Air Force
- Flight Lieutenant Eric Phillips DFC Royal Air Force
- Flight Lieutenant Wladyslaw Jan Potocki DFC Royal Air Force
- Flight Lieutenant Rex David Roe, Royal Air Force
- Flight Lieutenant Kenneth William Rogers, Royal Air Force
- Flight Lieutenant David Rankin Scott DFC Royal Air Force
- Flight Lieutenant Denis John Thomas Sharp DFC Royal Air Force
- Flight Lieutenant Jack Alan Shelley, Royal Air Force
- Flight Lieutenant John Stephen, Royal Air Force
- Flight Lieutenant William Notman Trimble, Royal Air Force
- Flight Lieutenant Frederick John Wheeler DFC Royal Air Force
- Flying Officer John Bruce, Royal Air Force
- Flying Officer Bedrich Froehlich, Royal Air Force
- Master Engineer Eric Russell Mears, Royal Air Force
- Master Engineer Master Signaller Raymond Edward Drake, Royal Air Force
- Flight Sergeant Ian Robertson Craig, Royal Air Force
- Flight Sergeant Hugh Edward Henry Wood, Royal Air Force
- Sergeant Raymond Arthur Barnes, Royal Air Force
- Sergeant Christopher David Humphreys, Royal Air Force
- Sergeant Ronald Sidney Jackson, Royal Air Force
- Sergeant Harry Watt Mackenzie, Royal Air Force

=== Royal Red Crosses ===
==== First Class (RRC) ====
- Kathleen Violet Chapman ARRC Principal Matron, Queen Alexandra's Royal Naval Nursing Service
- Major Nancy Hope Hodgman, Queen Alexandra's Royal Army Nursing Corps
- Major Edith Adrienne Horrocks, Queen Alexandra's Royal Army Nursing Corps
- Wing Officer Emily Martha Marfleet ARRC Princess Mary's Royal Air Force Nursing Service

==== Second Class (ARRC) ====
- Marjorie Smith, Senior Nursing Sister, Queen Alexandra's Royal Naval Nursing Service
- Margaret Gallagher Bonar, Supervising V.A.D. Nursing Member
- Major Ruth Constance Davis, Queen Alexandra's Royal Army Nursing Corps
- Major Carrie Trahair De Rouffignac, Queen Alexandra's Royal Army Nursing Corps
- Major Eva Thorpe, Queen Alexandra's Royal Army Nursing Corps
- Flight Officer Olwen Cecilia Rees, Princess Mary's Royal Air Force Nursing Service
- Flight Officer Annie Laura Greenwell Robertson, Princess Mary's Royal Air Force Nursing Service

=== Air Force Crosses (AFC) ===
- Wing Commander George Hubert Newbourne Shiells DFC Royal Australian Air Force
- Acting Wing Commander Konrad Bazarnik Royal Air Force
- Squadron Leader John Hanbury Smith-Carington, Royal Air Force
- Squadron Leader Lionel Harwood Casson DFC Royal Auxiliary Air Force
- Squadron Leader Henry Moresby Chinnery, Royal Air Force
- Squadron Leader Ernest Leonard David Drake DFC Royal Air Force
- Squadron Leader Terence Helper DFC Royal Air Force
- Squadron Leader Donald Ridgewell Howard DFC Royal Air Force
- Squadron Leader Denis Seymour Leete, Royal Air Force
- Squadron Leader Sidney James Perkins, Royal Air Force
- Squadron Leader Dunham Hodgson Seaton DFC Royal Air Force
- Acting Squadron Leader James Leslie Barlow, Royal Air Force
- Acting Squadron Leader Frederick Clark Barter, Royal Air-Force
- Acting Squadron Leader John Gascon Claridge DFC Royal Air Force
- Acting Squadron Leader David John Fowler, Royal Air Force
- Acting Squadron Leader Clifford Laurence Godwin, Royal Air Force
- Acting Squadron Leader John Miller DFC Royal Air Force
- Acting Squadron Leader Anthony Archibald Smafles, Royal Air Force
- Acting Squadron Leader Leslie Morris Whittington, Royal Air Force
- Flight Lieutenant Brian Spencer Adlington, Royal Air Force
- Flight Lieutenant George Brooks Bell, Royal Air Force
- Flight Lieutenant John Beaumont Blackett, Royal Air Force
- Flight Lieutenant John Anthony Brown, Royal Air Force
- Flight Lieutenant Roland Louis Ernest Burton, Royal Air Force
- Flight Lieutenant Ronald Desmond Campbell DFC Royal Air Force
- Flight Lieutenant Josef Hugo Cermak, Royal Air Force
- Flight Lieutenant Peter George Coulson, Royal Air Force
- Flight Lieutenant Henry Silvester Horth, Royal Air Force
- Flight Lieutenant Thomas Lawrie Kennedy, Royal Air Force
- Flight Lieutenant David Langford, Royal Air Force
- Flight Lieutenant John Gilbert Matthews, Royal Air Force
- Flight Lieutenant Charles John Morgan, Royal Air Force
- Flight Lieutenant Jaroslav Muzika, Royal Air Force
- Flight Lieutenant Kendall Cecil Douglas Nixon, Royal Air Force
- Flight Lieutenant Trevor Winston Oakey, Royal Air Force
- Flight Lieutenant John Stanley Owen,.Royal Air Force
- Flight Lieutenant John Douglas Price, Royal Air Force
- Flight Lieutenant Keith Bernard Rogers DFC Royal Air Force
- Flight Lieutenant Maldwyn Roy Sisley, Royal Air Force
- Flight Lieutenant Michael Clement Nevil Smart, Royal Air Force
- Flight Lieutenant Charles Michael Stavert, Royal Air Force
- Flight Lieutenant George Stephenson DFC Royal Air Force
- Flight Lieutenant Charles Donald Thieme, Royal Air Force
- Flight Lieutenant Anthony Philip Trowbridge, Royal Air Force
- Flight Lieutenant Geoffrey Victor Wadams, Royal Air Force
- Flight Lieutenant Kelly Aerial Whynacht DFC Royal Air Force
- Flight Lieutenant John Robert Wilcock, Royal Air Force
- Flight Lieutenant Richard Thomas Glyndwr Williams, Royal Auxiliary Air Force
- Flight Lieutenant David Wright, Royal Air Force
- Flying Officer Ivan Cardwell, Royal Air Force
- Flying Officer Maurice Arthur Joseph St. Pierre, Royal Air Force
- Flying Officer Jindrich Petr Skirka, Royal Air Force
- Master Pilot George Henry Owen, A.F.M Royal Air Force
- Lieutenant Commander Cecil Ernest Price, Royal Navy
- Lieutenant Frank Cawood, Royal Navy
- Lieutenant Thomas Guy Innes, Royal Navy
- Lieutenant Robert Wooton Jaggard, Royal Navy

==== Awarded a Bar to the Air Force Cross (AFC*) ====
- Squadron Leader Jim Lomas DFC AFC Royal Air Force
- Squadron Leader Leslie George Press AFC Royal Air Force
- Flight Lieutenant Neil Currie Thorne AFC Royal Air Force

=== Air Force Medals (AFM) ===
- Flight Sergeant Benjamin Roy Bradley, Royal Air Force
- Flight Sergeant James Dougan, Royal Air Force
- Flight Sergeant Alfred John Fairbairn, Royal Air Force
- Flight Sergeant Alistair Bruce Fraser, Royal Air Force
- Flight Sergeant Kazimierz Gorny, Royal Air Force
- Flight Sergeant Terence Maxwell Hamer, Royal Air Force
- Flight Sergeant (now Master Signaller) William Frederick Joseph Hills, Royal Air Force
- Flight Sergeant Austen Brian Howes, Royal Air Force
- Flight Sergeant Thomas McHugh DFC Royal Air Force
- Flight Sergeant Alexander Henry Shelton, Royal Air Force
- Flight Sergeant Henry Frederick John Thorpe, Royal Air Force
- Sergeant Zivan Atanackovig, Royal Air Force
- Sergeant Richard Eric Bowler, Royal Air Force
- Sergeant Geoffrey Ashwell Hall, Royal Air Force
- Sergeant William Sidney Jones, Royal Air Force
- Sergeant John Patrick McCarthy, Royal Air Force
- Sergeant Daniel Victor Sutton, Royal Air Force
- Sergeant Richard Thomas Vane, Royal Air Force

=== British Empire Medals (BEM) ===
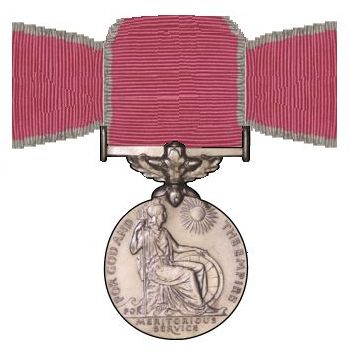
The British Empire Medal for meritorious service

==== Military Division ====
- Sergeant (acting) Isabella Galder Arbuthnot, Women's Royal Army Corps
- Sergeant Thomas Albert Ash, Corps of Royal Electrical and Mechanical Engineers, Territorial Army
- Staff-Sergeant (acting) William Baxter, Corps of Royal Electrical and Mechanical Engineers
- Staff-Sergeant Harold Edward Berry, Royal Army Service Corps
- Warrant Officer Class II (acting) Dorothy Mary Bisson, Women's Royal Army Corps
- Colour Sergeant (acting) John Arthur Charles Britnell, The Royal Berkshire Regiment (Princess Charlotte of Wales's)
- Staff-Sergeant Malcolm Burns, Corps of Royal Electrical and Mechanical Engineers, Territorial Army
- Warrant Officer Class I (acting) George Leonard Walter Carrington, Corps of Royal Electrical and Mechanical Engineers
- Staff-Sergeant (acting) George Henry Smith-Carter, Corps of Royal Engineers
- Sergeant Edward Thomas Chapman VC The Monmouthshire Regiment, Territorial Army
- Sergeant Thomas Henry Chapman, Corps of Royal Engineers
- Warrant Officer Class II (acting) (Artillery Clerk) Thomas Victor Childs, Royal Regiment of Artillery
- Warrant Officer Class II (acting) Daniel Comrie, The Argyll and Sutherland Highlanders (Princess Louise's)
- Sergeant Edwin Cookey, The Nigeria Regiment, Royal West African Frontier Force
- Staff-Sergeant (acting) Steven Frederick Cotterill, Corps of Royal Electrical and Mechanical Engineers
- Sergeant Walter Albert Dawkins, Army Catering Corps
- Warrant Officer Class II (acting) John Densham, Corps of Royal Engineers
- Warrant Officer Class I (acting) William Edward Dimond, Corps of Royal Military Police
- Sergeant Frederick Alfred Dodd, Corps of Royal Military Police
- Warrant Officer Class II (acting) Reginald Percival Fisher, Royal Regiment of Artillery
- Regimental Sergeant-Major Araba Fulani, The Gold Coast Regiment, Royal West African Frontier Force
- Charles Sidney Gayler, Corps of Royal Electrical and Mechanical Engineers
- Colour-Sergeant Robert Gibson, Scats Guards
- Staff-Sergeant Anthony Bruce Gillmore, Corps of Royal Military Police
- Sergeant Alan George Harfield, Royal Corps of Signals
- Corporal Audrey Alice Harris, Women's Royal Army Corps, Territorial Army
- Sergeant Ernest Harris, London Irish Rifles, Royal Ulster Rifles, Territorial Army
- Battery Quartermaster-Sergeant Albert Herbert, Royal Regiment of Artillery, Territorial Army
- Warrant Officer Class II (acting) (now Substantive) Douglas Lloyd Hill, Royal Army Ordnance Corps
- Sergeant William Hopkinson, Royal Regiment of Artillery, Territorial Army
- Warrant Officer Class II (acting) (now Substantive) James Thomas Hutson MM Royal Army Ordnance Corps
- Sergeant James Hyndman, 8th King's Royal Irish Hussars, Royal Armoured Corps
- Regimental Sergeant-Major Ali Kanjarga, The Gold Coast Regiment, Royal West African Frontier Force
- Staff-Sergeant (acting) Jack Keighley, Royal Army Service Corps
- Sergeant George Edward Kirk, The South Staffordshire Regiment, Territorial Army
- Sergeant (acting) William Knights, Army Catering Corps
- Staff-Sergeant (Instructor) William Francis Lane, Army Physical Training Corps
- Staff-Sergeant (acting) Alfred Gordon Littlewood, Royal Army Pay Corps
- Warrant Officer Class II (acting) William MacDonald, Royal Army Service Corps
- Battery Sergeant-Major Ngomoli Malombe, East Africa Artillery
- Lance-Corporal (acting) Alfred William Marshall, Royal Army Service Corps
- Warrant Officer Class II (acting) (now Substantive) Robert Sydney Martin, Royal Regiment of Artillery
- Sergeant Charles Edward Meacham, Corps of Royal Engineers
- Sergeant (acting) Samuel Alfred Moore, Royal Regiment of Artillery
- Sergeant William Thomas Morris, Army Catering Corps
- Sergeant William Moses, The Border Regiment
- Sergeant (Artillery Clerk) Norman Pass, Royal Regiment of Artillery
- Staff-Sergeant (acting) Reginald Frederick Patten, Royal Army Pay Corps
- Staff-Sergeant (now Warrant Officer Class II) (Artillery Clerk) Joseph Edward Pearson, Royal Regiment of Artillery
- Warrant Officer Class II (acting) David Radin, The Seaforth Highlanders (Ross-shire Buffs, The Duke of Albany's)
- Sergeant Walter Rathbone, The Royal Welch Fusiliers, Territorial Army
- Warrant Officer Class II (acting) Edward Robeson Rodger, Royal Army Medical Corps, Territorial Army
- Sergeant Dennis Harold Rose, Royal Army Service Corps
- Warrant Officer Class II (acting) John Russell, Royal Army Medical Corps
- Staff-Sergeant Johnson Scott, Royal Army Medical Corps, Territorial Army
- Warrant Office Class II (acting) George Everard Slater, The King's Royal Rifle Corps, formerly attached The Kenya Regiment, Territorial Army
- Corporal (acting) Linnette Adelie Small, Women's Royal Army Corps
- Sergeant James Alfred Smith, North Irish Horse, Royal Armoured Corps, Territorial Army
- Staff-Sergeant Marguerite Sylvia Smith, Women's Royal Army Corps
- Staff-Sergeant (Artillery Clerk) James Neil Tierney, Royal Regiment of Artillery, Territorial Army
- Warrant Officer Class II (acting) George Frederick Trodd, The Dorset Regiment
- Colour-Sergeant John Voce, The Queen's Own Cameron Highlanders, Territorial Army
- Staff-Sergeant George John William Walter, Royal Army Service Corps
- Sergeant (Bugle Major) Harold Ewart Wiltshire, The Somerset Light Infantry (Prince Albert's), Territorial Army
- Sergeant Alfred George Young, Royal Corps of Signals.
- Flight Sergeant John Dennis, Royal Air Force
- Flight Sergeant William Lockwood Gardner, Royal Air Force
- Flight Sergeant Geoffrey Fairweather Hankinson, Royal Air Force
- Flight Sergeant Ronald Heather, Royal Air Force
- Flight Sergeant Thomas Arthur William Kinzett, Royal Air Force
- Flight Sergeant William Frederick Lane, Royal Air Force
- Flight Sergeant Leonard Mallinson, Royal Air Force
- Flight Sergeant Joseph O'Rourke, Royal Air Force
- Flight Sergeant Ronald Palin, Royal Auxiliary Air Force
- Flight Sergeant Robert Richard Livesy Peers, Royal Air Force
- Flight. Sergeant Frederick Norman Ratliff, Royal Air Force
- Flight Sergeant David William Sarbutt, Royal Air Force
- Flight Sergeant Henry Schofield, Royal Air Force
- Flight Sergeant Andrew Cooper Scott, Royal Air Force
- Flight Sergeant Leslie Frank Vanderson, Royal Air Force
- Flight Sergeant Isaac Christmas Webb, Royal Air Force
- Flight Sergeant Henry William Wright, Royal Air Force
- Flight Sergeant Leslie Gordon Young, Royal Air Force
- Acting Flight Sergeant Graham Briggs, Royal Air Force
- Acting Flight Sergeant Leonard James Cross, Royal Air Force
- Acting Flight Sergeant Laura Elizabeth Lee, Women's Royal Air Force
- Acting Flight Sergeant John William Warren, Royal Air Force
- Sergeant Frederick William Brie Day, Royal Auxiliary Air Force
- Sergeant Alfred Samuel Huggett, Royal Air Force
- Sergeant Walter Lippiatt, Royal Air Force
- Sergeant Gilbert Noel Lipscomb, Royal Air Force
- Sergeant Duncan Reid Macintosh, Royal Air Force
- Sergeant Frank Albert Monks, Royal Air Force
- Sergeant Albert Edward Nash, Royal Air Force
- Sergeant Frank Todman Spencer, Royal Air Force
- Acting Sergeant Frederick Braggs, Royal Air Force
- Acting Sergeant Leonard Jenkins, Royal Air Force
- Acting Sergeant Arthur Francis Gabriel Phillips, Royal Air Force
- Acting Sergeant Wilfred Edmond Thompson, Royal Air Force
- Chief Technician Donald Thompson, Royal Air Force
- Corporal Frederick Bennett, Royal Air Force
- Corporal Philip George Bowerman, Royal Air Force
- Corporal Eric Chatt, Royal Air Force
- Corporal Arthur Swail, Royal Air Force
- Acting Corporal Keith Ashmore, Royal Air Force
- Senior Aircraftman Clive Alfred Bates, Royal Air Force
- Senior Aircraftman John Francis Smith-Woodward, Royal Air Force
- Chief Petty Officer Telegraphist John George Adamson
- Chief Petty Officer Cook (O) Salvatore Agius
- Radio Electrician (Air) Geoffrey George Barker
- Chief Petty Officer Writer Richard William Beamish
- Regimental Sergeant Major Leslie John Boote, Royal Marines
- Ordnance Artificer 1st Class William Brown
- Quartermaster Sergeant Albert James Brunsdon, Royal Marines
- Chief Petty Officer Joseph Chircop
- Chief Petty Officer Stoker Mechanic Leonard Reginald Christopher
- Chief Petty Officer Walter Samuel Clements
- Petty Officer Harold Robert Cook
- Chief Petty Officer William George Cosens
- Aircrewman I Sidney Craig
- Petty Officer Wren Steward (G) Nellie Crawford, Women's Royal Naval Service
- Radio Electrician (Air) Herbert Crossley
- Sick Berth Chief Petty Officer Alfred Thomas Davies
- Chief Petty Officer Alfred Jeffrey Dobson
- Quartermaster Sergeant Frederick Farrar, Royal Marines
- Chief Petty Officer Stoker Mechanic Henry Charles Fletcher
- Mechanician 1st Class Loder Offord Alfred Forsdyke
- Chief Electrician Bethuel Henry Griffiths
- Chief Engine Room Artificer Frank Ernest Vincent Harris
- Chief Yeoman of Signals Charles Dennis Hollett
- Chief Engine Room Artificer Frank Howells
- Petty Officer Wren Irene Ivy Jeffery, Women's Royal Naval Service
- Quartermaster Sergeant William George Jenkins, Royal Marines
- Leading Seaman Frederick James Johnson
- Chief Electrician Henry James Justice DSM
- Colour Sergeant Herbert Roy Kent, Royal Marines
- Master-at-Arms William Terence Littleford
- Stores Chief Petty Officer (V) Frederick George Albert Lloyd
- Chief Engine Room Artificer Albert Douglas Mcmillan
- Chief Wren Jean Love Maltman, Women's Royal Naval Service
- Chief Petty Officer Writer Archibald William Charles Parfitt
- Chief Petty Officer George Dobson Procter RNVR
- Chief Petty Officer William Thomas Randall
- Chief Airman Fitter (A) Keith Walter Bancroft Robertson
- Chief Radio Electrician (Air) George Henry Routleff
- Sick Berth Chief Petty Officer Abdul Ghani Bin Mohamed Sheriff, Royal Malayan Naval Volunteer Reserve
- Chief Petty Officer Albert Victor Smith
- Colour Sergeant James Taggert, Royal Marines
- Chief Engine Room Artificer Albert Henry Charles Taylor
- Master-at-Arms Alfred George Rex Tucker
- Chief Engine Room Artificer John Charles Warham DSM
- Sick Berth Attendant Donald Wilson

==== Civil Division ====
United Kingdom

- Alfred John Abbott, Foreman, Rotax Ltd. (South Harrow, Middlesex)
- Arthur Adkins, General Yard Foreman, Litchurch Gasworks, East Midlands Gas Board (Derby)
- Elizabeth Allard, Commandant, Jay-wick Detachment, British Red Cross Society (Clacton-on-Sea, Essex). For services during the recent floods in the Eastern Counties.
- Thomas Edward Allen, Working Burner and Machine Caulker, Vickers-Armstrongs, Ltd., Walker-on-Tyne (Wallsend-on-Tyne)
- Herbert James Emmanuel Andrews, Electrician, Littlebrook Power Station, British Electricity Authority, South Eastern Division (Dartford, Kent). For services during the recent floods in the Eastern Counties.
- Lilian Mary Armstrong, Senior Chief Supervisor, Birmingham Trunk and Toll Exchange (Tipton, Staffordshire)
- William Ashford, Site Foreman, Steel Scaffolding Company Ltd. (Worcester Park, Surrey)
- Stanley Victor Attewell, Temporary Technical Assistant, Ministry of Works (Bradmore, Nottingham). For services during the recent floods in the Eastern Counties.
- Victoria May Babbs, Canteen Supervisor, Tyrell Heath Primary School (Grays, Essex). For services during the recent floods in the Eastern Counties.
- Howard Bacon, Deputy, Teversal Colliery, East Midlands Division, National Coal, Board (Sutton-in-Ashfield)
- Arthur Baker, Underground Repairer, Birch Coppice Colliery, West Midlands Division1; National Coal Board (Atherstone, Warwickshire)
- Henry James Baker, Resident Plumber Turn-cock, H.M. Dockyard, Sheerness, For services during the recent floods in the Eastern Counties.
- William Baker, Craftsman, Wallace Collection (Clapham Common, S.W.ll)
- Frederick Thomas Balderstone, Civil Defence Instructor, Purfleet, Essex, For services during the recent floods in the Eastern Counties.
- Alfred Ball, Electrical Section Leader, Saunders-Roe Ltd., Cowes
- Eileen Christine Bannerman; Commandant, Roxburgh No. 12 Detachment, British Red Cross Society
- Helen Edna Barbour, Manageress, N.A.A.F.I., Felixstowe (Leicester). For services during the recent floods' in the Eastern Counties.
- Andrew Barker, Senior Assistant (Scientific), Chemical Defence Experimental Establishment, Ministry of Supply (Salisbury)
- Frederick Stephen Barnes, Craftsman Sheet Metal Worker, Department of Chief Mechanical Engineer (Road Services), London Transport Executive (Harrow, Middlesex)
- Bertha Bauer, Assistant Supervisor (Telegraphs), Wealdstone Branch Post Office, Harrow, Middlesex
- Maria Beauchamp (Sister Maria Edith), Superintendent, Les Cotils Nursing Hostel for Old People, Guernsey
- Albert William Beazley, Clerk of Works, Great Ouse River Board (Downham Market, Norfolk). For services during the recent floods in the Eastern Counties.
- Jean Margaret Belding, Firewoman, Norfolk Fire Service, King's Lynn (Terrington St. Clement, Norfolk). For services during the recent floods in the Eastern Counties.
- John Bell JP Checkweighman, Randolph and Gordon House Colliery, Durham Division, National Coal Board (Bishop Auckland)
- Frederick Arthur Gale Bentley, Foreman, Ministry of Works (Rawreth, Essex)
- Frederick Dennis Berry, Overseer, Padding-ton District Post Office (Upper Edmonton, N.18)
- Robert William Spears Bigg, Leading Architectural Assistant, War Office, Salisbury Plain (Amesbury, Wiltshire)
- Kenneth John Bird, Honorary Collector, Street Savings Group, South Baling, W.5
- Evelyn Bisley, Centre Organiser, Women's Voluntary Services, Queensborough (Minster, Kent). For services during the recent floods in the Eastern Counties.
- Stanley John Bissell, Inspector, Metropolitan Police Force (Westminster, S.W.I)
- John Blakey, Stores Class Grade II, Ministry of Supply (Thorp Arch, Yorkshire)
- Louis Gerald Blanc, Mechanic Examiner, Directorate of Inspection of Electrical and Mechanical Equipment, Ministry of Supply (Erith, Kent)
- Thomas George Bland, Timekeeper, John Mowlem & Company Ltd. (Palmers Green, N.13)
- Frederick William Bliss, Deputy Head Foreman, Hull and East Yorkshire River Board (Hull). For services during the recent floods in the Eastern Counties.
- Charles Redfern Bond, Head Chancery Messenger, H.M. Embassy, Cairo
- Bertie Leon Bowden, Divisional Superintendent, St. John Ambulance Brigade, Harwich, For services during the recent floods in the Eastern Counties.
- Harold Bowling, Constable, North Riding of Yorkshire Constabulary (Whitby). For services during the recent floods in the Eastern Counties.
- William Thomas Boxall, Farm Worker, North Mundham, Chichester
- Frank Bradbury, Foreman, North Eastern Electricity Board (Newcastle upon Tyne)
- John Brazington, Inspector of Park-keepers, Ministry of Works (Hyde Park, W.I.)
- George Albert Brett, Leading Engine Room Hand, S.S. Andes, Royal Mail Lines, Ltd., (Southampton)
- William Henry Brickwood, Foreman of Laboratory, R.N. Armament Depot, Priddy's Hard (Gosport)
- Ronald Frank Brooks, Chief Petty Officer Instructor, Holyhead Unit, Sea Cadet Corps
- Walter Brooks, Shop Foreman, Belvedere, Kent, For services during the recent floods in the Eastern Counties.
- George Brown, lately Assistant Foreman Gas Fitter, North Thames Gas Board (Tilbury)
- Herbert Sidney Stephen Brown, Technical Officer, Ministry of Labour and National Service (Southgate, N.14)
- James Charles Frederick Brown, Chief Inspector, Kent County Constabulary (Maid-stone, Kent). For services during the recent floods in the Eastern Counties.
- John R. Brown, Construction Foreman, South West Scotland Division, British Electricity Authority (Glasgow)
- Matthew Brown, Leading Capstanman, Queen's Dock, Clyde Navigation Trust (Glasgow)
- Thomas Richard Brown, Underground Repairer, Barnsley Main Colliery, North Eastern Division, National Coal Board (Barnsley)
- William Henry Brown, Foreman Toolmaker, Ernest Stevens Ltd. (Cradley Heath)
- Charles Bruce, Member, Coast Life Saving Corps, Balta Sound, Shetland
- Walter Bruce, Goods Guard, Eastern Region, Railway Executive (King's Lynn, Norfolk). For services during the recent floods in the Eastern Counties.
- Albert Burdon, Chargehand, Sigmund Pumps Ltd., Gateshead-on-Tyne (Dunston, Co. Durham)
- Andrew Cameron Burnett, Manager, Lord Roberts Workshops, Belfast
- Norman Richmond Cail, Station Master, Bedlington, Railway Executive, North Eastern Region
- William Campbell, Laboratory Mechanic, R.N. Torpedo Experimental Establishment (Greenock, Renfrewshire)
- William Nyren Card, Senior Supplies Superintendent, General Post Office (Crofton Park, S.E.4)
- Emily Cass, Centre Organiser, Driffield, Women's Voluntary Services
- Harry Catlow, Chief Loom Inspector, British Northrop Loom Company Ltd., Blackburn
- Lena Madeline Chaplin, Manageress, N.A.A.F.I., Grays (Braintree, Essex). For services during the recent floods in the Eastern Counties.
- Po Cheng, Chargehand, War Office, Hong Kong
- John Frederick Cocker, Temporary Storekeeper, Grade III, Ordnance Survey Department (Southampton)
- Elsie Cocking, Centre Organiser, downe Rural District, Derbyshire, Women's Voluntary Services (Creswell)
- Frank Basil Coker, Honorary Collector, Street Savings Group, Hove
- Percy Samuel Colleypriest, Assistant Engineer (Electrical Planning), South Eastern Division, British Electricity Authority (Hove)
- John Collijns, Supervisor, London County Council Rest Centre (Chingford, E.4)
- Frederick Harold Cook, Inshore Fisherman, Grimaby (Cleethorpes)
- Albert George Cooke, Honorary Collector, Street Savings Group, Kidderminster
- Raven Robert Eyland Cooper, Electrician, Weyboume Camp, War Office (Holt, Norfolk). For services during the recent floods in the Eastern Counties.
- John Edward Cowley, Inspector, Liverpool City Police Force
- Herbert Alvin Cox, Inspector, War Department Constabulary (Woolwich, S.E.I8)
- William Thomas James Cox, Radar Chain Installation Engineer, Marconi's Wireless Telegraph Company Ltd., Chelmsford (Pembroke)
- Albert Edmund John Craske, Mess Steward I, Air Ministry, Felixstowe, For services during the recent floods in the Eastern Counties.
- Edward James Crouch, Staff Instructor, Mill Hill School (Hendon, N.W.4)
- Charles Edward Cunliffe, Postman, Head Post Office, Chester
- Ena Cunningham, Honorary Collector, Works Savings Group, William Strain & Sons, Ltd., Belfast (Holywood, Co. Down)
- Harold Welby Curtis, Depot Superintendent, Sheerness Depot, Medway Group, British Road Services (Minster, Kent). For services during the recent floods in the Eastern Counties.
- Graham Frederick Flaxman Daniels, Detective Inspector, Norfolk County Constabulary (King's Lynn). For services during the recent floods in the Eastern Counties.
- Audrey Gertrude Daubrah, Commandant, North Lincolnshire Detachment, British Red Cross Society (Alford, Lincoln-shire). For services during the recent floods in the Eastern Counties.
- Hannah Davies, Forewoman, Simmonds Aerocessories Ltd., Treforest (Cardiff)
- William Walter Davis, Chargeman of Painters, H.M. Dockyard, Portland (Weymouth)
- Ernest Dean, lately Tool Room Miller, Renold & Coventry Chain Company Ltd., Manchester
- Hugh Delvin, Chief Observer, Post J.3, No. 34 Group, Royal Observer Corps, Glasgow
- Walter Douglas Denholm, Principal Smith, N. Hingley & Sons Ltd., Dudley, Worcestershire
- William John Dew, Warden, Territorial Army Drill Hall, Bristol
- Wilfred Frank Digby, Chief Paper Keeper, Tithe Redemption Commission (Leytonstone, E.11)
- John Michael Dobson, Coastguard-in-Charge, H.M. Coastguard Station, Felixstowe, For services during the recent floods in the Eastern Counties.
- Edward Willie Dodd, Mechanic Examiner, Ministry of Supply (West Wickham, Kent)
- Dorothy Kathleen Double, Assistant Supervisor, Telephone Exchange, Stow-market, Suffolk
- Charles Archibald Downes, Chief Inspector, Bristol Tramways and Carriage Company Ltd. (Bristol)
- Geoffrey Stephen Drewery, Motor Vehicle Fitter, Snettisham Depot, British Road Services (Snettisham, Norfolk). For services during, the recent floods in the Eastern Counties.
- David Clark Dunlop, Section Leader, Southwestern Area Fire Brigade, Scotland (Irvine, Ayrshire)
- Mary Jeanne Edwards, Restaurant Superintendent, N.A.A.F.I., Malaya
- Robert William Edwards, Mess Steward. War Office, Larkhill
- William Edwards JP Safety and Training Officer, East Walbottle Colliery, Northern (Northumberland and Cumberland) Division, National Coal Board (Newcastle upon Tyne)
- Joseph Elkington, Store-keeper, Leeds Government Training Centre, Ministry of Labour and National Service
- Edith Ellen Elloway, Manageress, Refreshment Club, Head Post Office, Newport
- Walter Elton, Underground Datal Worker, Clipstone Colliery, East Midlands Division, National Coal Board (Mansfield)
- Sidney Horace Empson, General Foreman, East Suffolk and Norfolk River Board (Great Yarmouth). For services during the recent floods in the Eastern Counties.
- Albert Joseph English, Senior Messenger, Cabinet Office (South Lambeth, S.W.8)
- The Reverend Leslie Abbott Erving, Warden and Civil Defence Instructor, Easington, For services during the recent floods in the Eastern Counties.
- Edwin Stanley Evans, Chargehand Process Worker, Grade I, Royal Ordnance Factory, Pembrey (Llanelly, Carmarthenshire)
- William Hugh Evans, Chief Steward, R.M.S. Cambria, British Transport Commission (Holyhead)
- James Fairley, Underground Repairer, Northfield Colliery, Scottish Division, National Coal Board (Shotts, Lanarkshire)
- Harold Edward Farwell, School Caretaker, Essex Local Education Authority (Thundersley, Essex). For services during the recent floods in the Eastern Counties.
- Hilda Folwell, Convoy Organiser, Women's Voluntary Services, Barrow-on-Soar, Leicestershire (Cropston, Leicestershire). For service during the recent floods in the Eastern Counties.
- Evelyn W. Foote, Verger and Sub-Sacrist, Westminster Abbey (Holborn, E.C.I)
- John Fulton, Head Foreman Plumber, Harland & Wolff, Ltd., London (Eltham, S.E.9)
- Walter Vincent Furness, Chief Observer, Post E.I. No. 7 Group, Royal Observer Corps, Manchester (Altrincham)
- Edith May Garlick, Honorary Collector, Street Savings Group, Stockport
- Frank Gee, Chief Inspector, Lancashire Constabulary (Preston)
- Thomas Watkin George, Sub-Postmaster, Greengates Town -Sub-Office, Bradford (Leeds)
- Frank Thomas Gerrish, Foreman, Brentford, Railway Executive, Western Region (West Ealing, W.13)
- George William Henry Gibson, Senior Foreman, Remploy Factory, Radcliffe (Hollin-jwood, Lancashire)
- Richard Gilbert, Foreman, Holman Brothers Ltd., Camborne, Cornwall
- George Thomas Gill, Pumping Attendant, Sewage Works, Thurrock Urban District Council (Grays, Essex). For services during the recent floods in the Eastern Counties.
- George Glaysher, Mechanic, National Physical Laboratory (Teddington, Middlesex)
- Derek Daniel Glover, Member, British Red Cross Society (Belvedere, Kent). For services during the recent floods in the Eastern Counties.
- Joseph Glover, lately Chief Steward, Trinity House Vessel Patricia (Dovercourt, Essex)
- Harry Hare Goodhand, Lineman, Class II, Railway Executive (Immingham, Lincolnshire). For services during the recent floods in the Eastern Counties.
- Harold Goodson, Head Foreman Boilersmith, United Steel Structural Company Ltd. (Scunthorpe)
- Walter Gothard, Smallholder, Tilbury, For services during the recent floods in the Eastern Counties.
- Ada Gough, Chief Closing Room Supervisor, J. A. Sabin, Ltd., Leicester
- Evelyn Gwendoline Grange, Centre Organiser, Herne Bay, Women's Voluntary Services, For services during the recent floods in the Eastern Counties.
- Mona Grant, Assistant County Organiser, County of London, Women's Voluntary Services (South Kensington, S.W.7)
- Norah Patricia Gray, Woman Chief Inspector, Birmingham City Police Force
- Ronald Gray, Foreman, Great Ouse River Board (Thetford, Norfolk). For services during the recent floods in the Eastern Counties.
- Percy Edward Green, Technician, Class II(A), Engineering Department, General Post Office (Brentwood, Essex)
- Howard William Greenaway, Sub-Inspector, Metropolitan Special Constabulary (Wimbledon, S.W.19)
- Bertrand Griffiths, Engraver and Chaser, Pearson Page Jewsbury Company Ltd. (Dudley, Worcestershire)
- Frank Albert Griffiths, Sub-Officer, Essex Fire Brigade (Canvey Island, Essex). For services during the recent floods in the Eastern Counties.
- Horace Edward Griggs, Works Superintendent, Kent River Board (Aylesford, Kent). For services during the recent floods in the Eastern Counties.
- William Henry Grindrod, Station Officer, Warwickshire Fire Brigade (Kenilworth)
- Cecil Grout, Crane Driver, R.N. Air Station, Lee-on-Solent, For services during the recent floods in the Eastern Counties.
- Frederick Midgley Guest, Honorary Collector, Carriage and Wagon Department, H.2. Shop Savings Group, British Railways, Derby
- Ronald Francis Gurney, Mobile Canteen Driver, N.A.A.F.I. Colchester (Honington, Suffolk). For services during the recent floods in the Eastern Counties.
- Ernest Charles Guy, Chief Petty Officer Instructor, Carlisle Unit, Sea Cadet Corps
- Thomas Charles Hackett, Foreman Bricklayer, Phillips Cycles Ltd., Smethwick
- James Alexander Hadden, Foreman, Barry Ostlere & Shepherd Ltd., Kirkcaldy
- Thomas Hagart, Mess Steward, Grade I, (Royal Air Force Station, Andover (Am-port, Hampshire)
- Harold Hall, Custodian of Ancient Monuments, Ministry of Works (Muchelney Abbey, Somerset)
- Hilda Hall, Honorary Collector, New Tredegar (Village) Savings Group (Aberbargoed)
- Charles Hampton, Omnibus Driver, Thames Valley Traction Company Ltd. (Reading)
- Alice Hanks, Centre Organiser, Sheerness, Women's Voluntary Services, For services during the recent floods in the Eastern Counties.
- Doris Hardy, Member, Women's Voluntary Services, East Suffolk (Aldeburgh, Suffolk). For services during the recent floods in the Eastern Counties.
- Ernest Victor Harker, Senior Assistant (Scientific), Ministry of Pensions Hospital, Mossley Hill, Liverpool
- Cecil James Harris, Clerk of Works (Electrical), War Office, Malta
- Thomas Harris, Chief Instructor, Government Training Centre, Ministry of Labour and National Service (Barking, Essex)
- James Arthur Harrison, Foreman, H. Sullen & Sons Ltd., Cromer, For services during the recent floods in the Eastern Counties.
- James Harte, Honorary Collector, Drumaness Mill Savings Group, Ballynahinch, Co. Down
- Ada Ellen Harvey, Divisional Nursing Superintendent, St. John Ambulance Brigade, Grays, For services during the recent floods in the Eastern Counties.
- Percy Harvey, Warden, Civil Defence Corps, Tilbury, For services during the recent floods in the Eastern Counties.
- Hassin Bin Ahmad, Mobile Cinema Operator and Driver, Army Kinema Corporation, Malaya
- Raymond Hasthorpe, Lorry Driver, Waithe, Lincolnshire, For services during the recent floods in the Eastern Counties.
- Roland Henry Hastings, Installation Inspector, Sheffield District, Yorkshire Electricity Board (Sheffield)
- Walter Charles Hatcher, Greaser, M.V. Stirling Castle, Union Castle Mail Steamship Company Ltd. (Southampton)
- Leonora Hayne, Deputy County Organiser, Kent, Women's Voluntary Services (Langton, Kent). For services during the recent floods in the Eastern Counties.
- Charles Higgs JP Warden, Civil Defehce Corps, Isle of Grain, Kent, For services during the recent floods in the Eastern Counties.
- Alfred Holding, Boilermaker, R. & H. Green & Silley Weir, Ltd., Royal Albert Docks (Custom House, E.16)
- Rene Stanger Holland, Canteen Supervisor, Gee, Walker and Slater Ltd. (Derby). For services during the recent floods in the Eastern Counties.
- Clarence Montague Hollis, Inspector, City of London Special Constabulary (Bush Hill Park, Middlesex)
- John Cormack Hood, Principal Officer, H.M. Prison, Aberdeen
- David William Hopkin, Linesman, South Wales Electricity Board (Pontyclun)
- Alfred Hopkinson, School Catiretaker, Lincolnshire (Lindsey) Local Education Authority (Cleethorpes). For services during the recent floods in the Eastern Counties.
- Susan Horan, Centre Organiser, Chepstow Urban District, Women's Voluntary Services
- Herbert Horton, Smallholder, Saltfleet, Lincolnshire, For services during the recent floods in the Eastern Counties.
- Thomas David Horton, Chargehand Coal Plant Operator, South Wales Division, British Electricity Authority (Pontypridd)
- William Edward' Howes, Sergeant, Essex County Constabulary (Canvey Island). For services during the recent floods in the Eastern Counties.
- Elizabeth Howorth, Honorary Collector, Street Savings Groups, West Denton, Newcastle upon Tyne
- Frederick Payne Hudson, Maintenance Fitter, British Industrial Solvents, Ltd. (Hull)
- Marjorie Hughes, Centre Organiser, Barnstaple, Women's Voluntary Services
- Robert Edwin Hughes, Checkweighman, North Eastern Division, National Coal Board (Doncaster)
- William Hughes, Manager, Group Training Centre (Whitwood Colliery), North Eastern Division, National Coal Board (Normanton)
- William John Hughes, Chargeman of Caulkers, H.M. Dockyard, Sheerness, For services during the recent floods in the Eastern Counties.
- Henry Charles Hunt, Leather Sorter, Dent, Allcroft and Company, Ltd. (Worcester)
- John Husbands, Electrical Fitter, Electric Construction Company, Wolverhampton (Wednesfield)
- Robert Stephen Irwin, Detective Sergeant, Royal Ulster Constabulary (Hillsborough, Co. Down)
- Phyllis Katherine James, Honorary Collector, Street Savings Group, Bristol
- George Nicol Jarvis, Carpenter, M.V. Wairangi, Shaw Sawill and Albion Company, Ltd. (East Ham, E.6)
- Jasper Sidney Jeal, Centre Lathe Turner, Dewrance & Co. Ltd, London (Bexley Heath, Kent)
- August Thomas Jensen, Licensee, Lowestoft, For services during the recent floods in the Eastern Counties.
- Helen Ada Jerome, Rest Centre Leader, Erith, Kent, For services during the recent floods in the Eastern Counties.
- Robert John, Underground Repairer, South Western Division, National Coal Board (Rhondda)
- Harold Raine Johnson, Engineering and Main
- Tenance Foreman, Whessoe Ltd., Darlington
- Harry Johnson, Surface Labourer, Silverdale Colliery, West Midlands Division, National Coal Board (Silverdale)
- Daniel Jones, Leading Hand, Zinc Distillation Plant, National Smelting Company, Ltd., Swansea (Neath)
- Ernest Jones, Shift Supervisor, Bradford Road Station, Manchester Group, North Western Gas Board (Manchester)
- Maud H. Jones, Personal Assistant, Headquarters, Women's Voluntary Service (Bethnal Green, E.2)
- Sidney Richard Jones, Mechanical Fitter, Midlands Electricity Board (Birmingham)
- Thomas Roger Jones, Skilled Labourer, R.N. Hospital Chatham (Gillingham, Kent)
- William Henry Jones, Foreman, Hemp Small Splicing Department, Wrights' Ropes, Ltd. (Birmingham)
- William Thomas Jones, Head Driver, Vange Ambulance Station, Essex, For services during the recent floods in the Eastern Counties.
- Richard Judd, Gas Fitter, Distribution Department, Salisbury Gas Undertaking, Southern Gas Board (Salisbury)
- Harold Juniper, Works Supervisor, Whitstable Urban District Council, For services during the recent floods in the Eastern Counties.
- Alexander Frederick King, Telephone Operator, War Office, Sheerness, For services during the recent floods in the Eastern Counties.
- John Allen Kirby, Artificer, R.N. Engineering Laboratory (Hounslow, Middlesex)
- George Christopher Kirton, Skilled Setter, Royal Ordnance Factory, Birtley (Sunderland)
- John William Kyle, Radio Mechanic, Grade I, Telecommunications Section, Ministry of Civil Aviation (Glasgow)
- William Bertie Land, Reclamation Foreman, H.M. Borstal Institution, North Sea Camp (Frieston, Lincolnshire)
- Arthur Langfield, Engineer, Walter Pollard (1923) Ltd. (Nelson)
- Albert Edward Langford, Technician, Class I, Post Office Telephone Exchange, Tiverton, Devon (Wellington, Somerset)
- Jane Laverty, Auxiliary Postwoman, Priestland Sub Office, Co. Antrim
- William Edward Lawrence, Senior Assistant, Zoological Society of London (Northold, Middlesex)
- Leonard Leach, Process Foreman, Magnesium Elektron, Ltd. (Manchester)
- Hannah Dorothea Leeman, Centre Organiser, Spilsby, Women's Voluntary Services (Addlethorpe, Lincolnshire). For services during the recent floods in the Eastern Counties.
- Alfred Henry Leonard, Overseer, General Post Office (Honor Oak Park, S.E.23)
- William Lewis, Senior Storeman, Proof and Experimental Establishment, Ministry of Supply (Pendine, Carmarthenshire)
- Leslie George Ling, Special Constable, East Suffolk County Constabulary (Iken, Suffolk). For services during the recent floods in the Eastern Counties.
- Ernest Colin McArthur, Transport Foreman and Deputy Fitting Foreman, Stockton Unit, Northern Gas Board (Stockton-on-Tees)
- Percy James Thompson Macaulay, Leading Draughtsman, Cammell Laifd and Company, Birkenhead (Wallasey, Cheshire)
- Alexander McCulloch, Chargehand, Drysdale and Company, Ltd., Glasgow
- Charles Alfred Mace, Underground Repairer, Llanharan Colliery, South Western Division, National Coal Board (Pencoed)
- John MacFarlane, Blind Telephone Operator, Export Credits Guarantee Department (Ilford, Essex)
- James McGowan, Repairer and Pumper, Gate-side Colliery, Scottish Division, National Coal Board (Sanquhar, Dumfriesshire)
- Annie McIntosh, Senior Leading Fire-woman, North-Eastern Fire Brigade, Scotland (Aberdeen)
- Philip McKeever, Able Seaman, S.S. Esso Bedford, Esso Transportation Company, Ltd. (Belfast)
- John Turnley McKinley, Sergeant, Londonderry Harbour Police
- Gilbert McKirdy, Boatswain, Fishery Board for Scotland (Rothesay, Bute)
- David Mcruvie, Deckhand, Fishing Vessel William Wilson (Cellardykes, Fife)
- Walter Makepeace, Boiler House Maintenance Engineer, Southport Power Station, Mersey-side and North Wales Division, British Electricity Authority (Southport)
- Edwin Martin, Surface Workman, Oxcroft Colliery, East Midlands Division, National Coal Board (Chesterfield)
- Royston Henry Massey, Station Warden, Royal Air Force Station, Pembroke Dock
- Robert Mayne, Boatswain, S.S. Baron Elgin, H. Hogarth and Sons (Edinburgh)
- William Ivor Merrett, Chief Steward, Falfield Civil Defence Technical Training School, Gloucestershire
- James Mew, Leading Hand of Pensioners, H.M.S. Victory (Ship) (Southsea)
- Evaline Miller, Assistant Billeting Officer, Glasgow, Women's Voluntary Services
- William James Miller, Coastguard, H.M. Coastguard Station, Felixstowe, For services during the recent floods in the Eastern Counties.
- Elizabeth Lily Mills, School Meals Organiser, Great Yarmouth County Borough, For services during the recent floods in the Eastern Counties.
- John William Mills, Foreman, Robert Fletcher and Sons, Ltd. (Greenfield, Yorkshire)
- Albert Mitchell, Farm Worker, Dunsden, near Reading
- Ernest John Monk, Ganger, Essex River Board (Rochford, Essex). For services during the recent floods in the Eastern Counties.
- George Francis Henry Moore, Cigarette Machine Operator, Carreras, Ltd. (Highbury, N.5)
- Hopkin Morris, Underground Overman, South Western Division, National Coal Board (Glamorgan)
- William George Morris, Foreman, Craftsman Vellum and Parchment Maker, H. Band and Company, Ltd. (Isleworth, Middlesex)
- Bruce Mosley, Driver, Nottingham Depot, Trent Motor Traction Company, Ltd. (Nottingham)
- Ernest Mountford, Assistant Superintendent, Head Post Office, Stoke-on-Trent (Newcastle, Staffordshire)
- James Muir, District Manager, Gas Works, Galston, Scottish Gas Board
- Edward W. Mumford, Fisherman, Great Wakering, Essex, For services during the recent floods in the Eastern Counties.
- Isaac Murphy, Technician, Class II (B), Belfast Telephone Area
- Joseph Murray, Foreman Armature Winder, Tuscan Engineering Company, Ltd., Bridgend
- Eileen Mary Musgrove, Postal and Telegraph Officer, Head Post Office, Richmond, Yorkshire
- Dorothy Mary Newell, Commandant, Claydon Detachment, British Red Cross Society (Claydon, Suffolk). For services during the recent floods in the Eastern Counties.
- Dorothy Newsam, Centre Organiser, Hoddesdon Urban District, Women's Voluntary Services (Broxbourne)
- William Edward Nutting, Hot Saw Grinder, Round Oak Steel Works, Ltd., Brierley Hill
- Frank Alfred Oliver, General Foreman, Turriff Construction Corporation, Ltd. (Croydon, Surrey)
- George Oxenbredge, Head Gardener, North-West European District, Imperial War Graves Commission
- Reginald George Pain, Setter-Operator, AC-Delco Division of General Motors, Ltd., Dunstable (Luton)
- Richard Harold Parker, Chief Inspector, South Western District Post Office (Worcester Park, Surrey)
- Elizabeth Parry, Screenhand, Nook Colliery, North Western Division, National Coal Board (Tyldesley, Lancashire)
- Alice Pateman, Press Operator, E. S. Perry, Ltd. (Edmonton, N.I8)
- Joseph William Percival Payton, General Foreman, Surveyor's Department, Sheerness Urban District Council, For services during the recent floods in the Eastern Counties.
- Ernest Edward Peach, Foreman Electrician, Patent Shaft and Axletree Company, Ltd., Wednesbury
- Joan Peacock, Spinner, Finlayson, Bousfield and Company, Ltd., Johnstone, Renfrewshire
- James Pearce, Chargehand Installation Inspector, Canvey Island, For services during the recent floods in the Eastern Counties.
- Robert Lennie Pearson, Assistant Divisional Officer, Norfolk Fire Brigade (King's Lynn). For services during the recent floods in the Eastern Counties.
- Thomas William Pestell, Foreman and Bacon Drier, I. Beer and Sons, Ltd. (Walthamstow, E.17)
- Sidney George Phillips, Chief Engineer of a steam trawler (Milford Haven)
- Henry William Philpott DSM lately Vocational Training Instructor, H.M. Dockyard, Chatham (Gillingham, Kent)
- John Peter William Pilkington, Foreman Labourer, Rolls-Royce, Ltd., Barnoldswick
- Margaret Pitcher, Centre Organiser, Maidenhead, Women's Voluntary Services
- Emily Pitkin, Catering Supervisor, Erith, For services during the recent floods in the Eastern Counties.
- Frederick Platt, Fitter, Ede and Ravenscroft, Ltd., Robemakers (Ashford, Middlesex)
- Alice Mary Pleasants, Honorary Collector, Ranspme Sims and Jefferies Savings Group, Ipswich
- Arthur Plowman, Foreman Dyer, Edward and James Richardson, Ltd., Newcastle upon Tyne
- Norah Porritt, Centre Organiser, Basford Rural District (South) Nottinghamshire, Women's Voluntary Services
- Frederick Albert Potter, Telephone Mechanic, Factories Department, General Post Office (Kenton, Middlesex), ?Lincolnshire Fire Brigade (Louth, Lincolnshire). For services during the recent floods in the Eastern Counties.
- Joseph Edwin Prothero, Electrical Fitter, English Electric Company, Ltd., Stafford
- Ernest Prout, Machine Shop Foreman, Priestman Brothers, Ltd., Hull
- Sydney Lawrence Purse, Mechanic, Ministry of Supply (Stockwell, S.W.9)
- Roger Richard Quinn, Head Storekeeper, Sea Transport Stores, Ministry of Transport, Bristol (Yate, Gloucestershire)
- Leonard Raven, Farm Foreman, Tillingham, Essex, For services during the recent floods in the Eastern Counties.
- Charles Edward Reddin, Sub-Officer, North Riding of Yorkshire Fire Brigade (Northallerton)
- Charles William Redford, Head Forester, Forestry Commission (Santon Downham, Suffolk). For services during the recent floods in the Eastern Counties.
- Robert William George Rees, Chief Officer, Class I, H.M. Prison, Liverpool
- James Henry Reid, Inspector, Birmingham City Police Force
- Frederick James Richards, Engineering Craftsman. Chatwood Safe and Engineering Company, Shrewsbury
- Trevor Richards, Dock Worker, National Dock Labour Board (Swansea)
- Charles Thomas Richardson, Transport Foreman, Hadfields, Ltd., Sheffield
- Maureen Riley, Voluntary Worker, Canvey Island (Sheffield). For services during the recent floods in the Eastern Counties.
- James Gordon Lennox Robertson, Postman, Higher Grade, Head Post Office, Perth
- Corneille Robinson, Centre Organiser, Whitstable, Women's Voluntary Services, For services during the recent floods in the Eastern Counties.
- John Henry Robson, Foreman Glass Blower, Hartley Wood and Company, Sunderland
- James Alfred Rudling, lately Works Superintendent, St. Mary Cray Gasworks (Ramsgale)
- Frances Marion Rundle, Centre Organiser, Dovercourt, Women's Voluntary Services. For services during the recent floods in the Eastern Counties
- John Rushton, Overman, Sandhole Colliery, North Western Division, National Coal Board (Walkden, Lancashire)
- George Sanday, Staff Instructor, Rossall School, Fleetwood
- Frederick Sandcraft, Mess Superintendent, Royal Military Academy, Sandhurst (Camberley, Surrey)
- Frank William Sargisson, Senior Driver, Lincolnshire Road Car Company, Ltd. (Lincoln)
- Walter Frank Savage, Baker and Confectioner, M.V. Carnarvon Castle, Union Castle Mail Steamship Company, Ltd. (Southampton)
- William Sayner, Works Engineer, Grimsiby Gas Undertaking, East Midlands Gas Board (Grimsby)
- Spiro Scerri, Supervisor (Mechanical and Electrical), Air Ministry Works Repair Depot, Suez Canal Zone
- Harold Scobey, Station Master, Parkeston, Essex, For services during the recent floods in the Eastern Counties.
- Michael Scott, Driller and Roof Sealer, Anhydrite Mine, Imperial Chemical Industries, Billingham
- Arthur Edward Searle, Chargeman of Skilled Labourers, H.M.S. Fisgard (Torpoint, Cornwall)
- Anthony Segui, Principal Foreman, War Office, Gibraltar
- Charlie William Thomas Setterfield, Inspector, Kent County Constabulary, Maidstone (Herne Bay). For services during the recent floods in the Eastern Counties.
- William James Sewell, Electrician, North Thames Gas Board (Westcliff on Sea). For services during the recent floods in the Eastern Counties.
- Emmanuel Shimon, Clerk, Grade I, Royal Air Force Levies, Iraq
- Eva Lena Shipley, Welfare Supervisor, Ferodo, Ltd., Stockport (Buxton)
- Edward Simmons, Chargeman Coppersmith, J. Russell and Company, Ltd., Liverpool
- Arthur Nicol Simpson, Head Forester, Tulliallan Nursery, Kincardine-on-Forth, Forestry Commission
- George Sinclair, Deckhand, Steam Trawler Gilmar (Aberdeen)
- Alfred Arthur Singer, Bandmaster, Duke of York's Royal Military School, Dover
- William Singleton JP Station Foreman (Tickets), Preston, Railway Executive, London Midland Region (Preston)
- Charles Leonard Smith, Machinist, Littleton Colliery, West Midlands Division, National Coal Board (Cannock)
- Lucy Mary Smith, Chief Supervisor, Telephone Training School, Clerkenwell Telephone Exchange (Honor Oak Park, S.E.23)
- Robert William Smith, Divisional Superintendent, St. John Ambulance Brigade, Hunstanton, For services during the recent floods in the Eastern Counties.
- Wilfred Smith, Divisional Superintendent, St. John Ambulance Brigade, Selby, Yorkshire, For services during the recent floods in the Eastern Counties.
- John Spelman MM Principal Doorkeeper, House of Lords (Kennington, S.E.ll)
- James Spowart, Inspector, Perthshire and Kinrossshire Constabulary (Perth)
- Firth Squire, Warehouseman, British Belting and Asbestos, Ltd. (Cleckheaton)
- Reginald Stuart Steadman, Resident Inspector, North Thames Gas Board, Grays, Essex, For services during the recent floods in the Eastern Counties.
- Cyril Herbert Stedman, Depot Manager, Dart-ford, Kent, House Coal Distribution (Emergency)
- Scheme (Dartford, Kent)
- Arthur Leonard Stent, Staff Instructor, Royal Grammar School, Guildford
- Harold Richard Stephens, General Handyman, Tilbury, For services during the recent floods in the Eastern Counties.
- Lina Stephenson, Honorary Collector, Street and Village Savings Group, Patrington, Hull
- Septimus Stobbart, Coal Filler, Pegswood Colliery, Northern (Northumberland and Cumberland) Division, National Coal Board (Morpeth)
- Edward George Joseph Stokes, Boatswain, Admiralty (Dovercourt). For services during the recent floods in the Eastern Counties.
- David Edward Stringer, Station Officer, H.M. Coastguard Station, Lizard, Cornwall
- Thomas Bernard Strong, Foreman of Trades, Royal Air Force Station, Hawarden (Chester)
- Edward Bradstock Tanner, Overseer of Birds, Zoological Society of London (Finchley, N.3)
- Wilfred Arthur Tanner, General Foreman, Richard Costain, Ltd. (Carshalton, Surrey)
- Samuel Taylor, Foreman, Lincolnshire River Board (Grimsby). For services during the recent floods in the Eastern Counties.
- John Arthur Thelwell, Permanent Way Inspector, Reading, Railway Executive, Western Region (Reading)
- Edward James Thomas, Staff Foreman, Morris Motors, Ltd., Llanelly
- Frank Thomas, Head Foreman Loftsman, Vickers-Armstrongs, Ltd., Barrow-in-Furness
- Lydia Olwen Thomas, Group Officer, Glamorganshire Fire Brigade (Llanelly)
- William Thomas, Underground worker, Hafod Colliery, North Western Division, National Coal Board (Wrexham)
- Thomas Charles Thompson, Boiler Shop Plater, Harland and Wolff, Ltd., Belfast
- Charles Trego, Coal Conveyor Attendant, South Western Division, British Electricity Authority (Weston-super-Mare)
- William Oliver Trotman, Distribution Superintendent, Stratford-upon-Avon District Undertaking, West Midlands Gas Board (Stratford-upon-Avon)
- Frederick Tunstall, Salvage Worker, Clifton Colliery, Northern (Northumberland and Cumberland) Division, National Coal Board (Workington)
- Frank Turner JP Underground Repairer, Snowdon Colliery, South Eastern Division, National Coal Board (Canterbury)
- Harry Ernest Edward Wade, Works Foreman, West Minster Works, Sheerness, South Eastern Gas Board, For services during the recent floods in the Eastern Counties.
- Henry Wady, Production Foreman, Humber Works, G. and T. Earle, Ltd., Cement Manufacturers (Melton)
- Charles Geoffrey Walker, Carpenter, War Office, Humfoer Sea Forts (Barnetby, Lincolnshire)
- Percival Walton, Publications Storekeeper, Victoria and Albert Museum (Walham Green, S.W.6)
- William Walton, Checbweighman and Lodge Secretary, Medomsley Colliery, Durham Division, National Coal Board (Consett)
- Charles Warde, Tool Shop Assistant Foreman, Automatic Telephone and Electric Company, Ltd., Liverpool (Prescot)
- Harry Wardle, Chief Foreman Fitter, Walmsleys (Bury) Ltd., Bury
- William Watkiss, Hotel Manager, Sutton-on-Sea, Lincolnshire, For services during the recent floods in the Eastern Counties.
- Lilian Dorothy Watts, Draughtswoman, Highways Engineering Department, Ministry of Transport (Norbury, S.W.I6)
- Annie Webber, Leader of First Aid Post, St. John Ambulance Nursing Division, South-end, For services during the recent floods in the Eastern Counties.
- William John Webber, Foreman, Aluminium Wire and Cable Company, Ltd., Port Tennant, Swansea
- Arthur Charles Stanley Wescott, Foreman, Royal Observatory (New Eltham, S.E.9)
- Eileen May West, Manageress N.A.A.F.I., Weybourne (Epsom Downs, Surrey). For services during the recent floods in the Eastern Counties.
- Mark Randall Wheatley, Foreman Turbine Driver, Spondon Power Station, East Midlands Division, British Electricity Authority (Hkeston, Derbyshire)
- Jack Whyman, Shop Foreman, Royal Air Force Station, Quedgeley (Gloucester)
- Lawrence Gerald Wickham, Station Officer, Kent Fire Brigade (Sheerness). For services during the recent floods in the Eastern Counties.
- John Walter Wilding, Head Cheesemaker, Minsterley Creameries, Ltd., Minsterley, Shropshire
- Owen Williams, Honorary Collector, Marchwiel Village Savings Group (Wrexham)
- William Williams, Surface Worker, Woodend Colliery, Scottish Division, National Coal Board (Maddiston, Stirlingshire)
- Harry Willsmer, Farm Foreman, Great Wakering, Essex, For services during the recent floods in the Eastern Counties.
- John Willsmer, Farm Worker, Great Wakering, Essex, For services during the recent floods in the Eastern Counties.
- William Andrew Wilson, Sub-Postmaster, Tynron, Thornhill, Dumfriesshire
- Cecil Frederick Witt, Head Gardener, French District, Imperial War Graves Commission
- Norman John Wood, Inspector, Essex County Constabulary (Harwich). For services during the recent floods in the Eastern Counties.
- George Woodcock, Chief Inspector, West Riding of Yorkshire Constabulary (Wakefield)
- Arthur Clifford Wragg, Coal Plant Supervisor, Rotherham Power Station, Yorkshire Division, British Electricity Authority (Rotherham)
- Edward Thomas Wright, Warden, Territorial Army Drill Hall, Norwich
- Ernest Wright, Carpenter, Veterinary Laboratory, Ministry of Agriculture and Fisheries (New Haw, Weybridge)
- Frank Arthur Wright, Yard Foreman, Leeds District Distribution and Transport Department, North Eastern Gas Board (Leeds)
- Alfred Wyatt, Kiln Burner, Tondu Brickworks Company, Ltd., Aberkenfig, Bridgend
- Thomas Henry Young, Mate in Charge, R.A.S.C. Vessel Fusee (Weymouth)

State of South Australia

- Walter Muggleton, Messenger, Department of the Premier, State of South Australia

Colonial Empire

- Charles Samuel Thorne, Head Keeper, South Point Lighthouse, Barbados
- Donald Abrams, Engineer, Georgetown Fire Brigade, British Guiana
- Alexander Bertfield Clarke, lately Sergeant Major, British Honduras Police Force
- Hussein Zihni Mehmed, Senior Compositor, Printing Department, Cyprus
- Kyriacos Nicolaides, Mukhtar at Peyia, Cyprus
- Dharam Dev Mayor, Station Master, Kampala, East Africa High Commission
- Zainal Abidin Bin Mohamed Lati, Penghulu of Lenggeng Mukim, Federation of Malaya
- Abu Bakar Bin Tahir, Engineman, Marine Department, Federation of Malaya
- Krishnaswamy Iyer Balasubramaniam, Clerk, Police Clerical Service, Federation of Malaya
- Chow Fong, Headman of Sikamat New Village, Federation of Malaya
- Louis Victor John, Technical Assistant, Drainage and Irrigation Department, Selangor, Federation of Malaya
- Keow Chong Ghee, Station Master, Malayan Railway, Federation of Malaya
- Lim Swee Hun, Chief Clerk, Penang Library, Federation of Malaya
- Mohamed Bin Awang Noh, Penghulu of Temerloh District, Federation of Malaya
- Phang Mok Sen, Interpreter, Integrity Commission, Federation of Malaya
- Tam Chin Siong, Chairman, M.C.A., Kuala Pilah Branch, Federation of Malaya
- Voon Wan, Assistant Mechanical Superintendent, Drainage and Irrigation Department, Federation of Malaya
- Yahya Bin Haji Abdul Aziz, Penghulu, Mukim of Bakri, Johore, Federation of Malaya
- Haji Yusof Bin Haji Nordin, Storekeeper, Federal Police Stores, Federation of Malaya
- Benjamin Allassan, Chargeman, Works Department, Gold Coast
- Kojo Kessie, Chief Warder, Prison Service, Gold Coast
- Parmenas Kiritu Njagi, President, Naivasha African Court, Kenya
- Justus Muema Nzau, Hospital Assistant, Kitui Native Civil Hospital, Kenya
- Tiamiyu Aminu Bolaji, Tax Collector, Nigeria
- Chief Mukobela, Chief of the Ila tribe, Northern Rhodesia
- Dason Stokes Mukupa, Head Master, Lunzuwa Primary School, Northern Rhodesia
- Franklin Temba, African Clerk, Provincial Administration, Northern Rhodesia
- Kotali Stephen McLaren Masseah, Head Clerk, District Headquarters, Cholo, Nyasaland Protectorate
- Ishmael Mwale, Member, African Protectorate Council, Nyasaland Protectorate
- Abdi Dualeh, Broadcaster Clerk, Information Department, Somaliland Protectorate
- Haji Mohamoud Jama, Akil of the Dolbahanta tribe, Somaliland Protectorate
- Jama Mohamoud, Akil of the Habr Toljaala tribe, Somaliland Protectorate
- David Mkome, son of Nyamhagata, Clerk, Junior Service, Tanganyika
- Omari, son of Nghanyanga, Sergeant Major, Tanganyika Police Force
- Barnaba Leslie Reginald Saitte, Cashier, Junior Service, Tanganyika
- Ali, son of Keni, Chief Warder, Luzira Central Prison, Uganda
- Frank Douglas Slocombe, Senior Messenger, Office of the Comptroller, Development and Welfare Organisation, West Indies
- Suleiman Mussa, Nurse, Ziwani Police Lines, Zanzibar Protectorate

=== Imperial Service Order (ISO) ===
Home Civil Service

- Robert Alexander MC Principal Examiner, Board of Trade (Welwyn Garden City)
- Edgar James Allies OBE Accountant-General, Commonwealth Relations office (South Woodford, E.18)
- William Hales Ballard, Chief Executive Officer, Home Office (Norbury, S.W.16)
- Cecil John Bruce OBE Assistant Controller, H.M. Stationery Office (Wallhigton, Surrey)
- Gilbert Henderson Clark, Chief Executive Officer, Scottish Home Department (Edinburgh)
- James Austin Clarke, Deputy Director, Warehousing Division, Ministry of Food (North Harrow, Middlesex)
- John Thomas Darling, Deputy Director of Audit, Exchequer and Audit Department (Barnet, Hertfordshire)
- Frederick Raine Ennos, Senior Principal Scientific Officer, Government Chemist's Department (Croydon, Surrey)
- Sidney Stephen John Evans, Principal, War Office (Cricklewood, N.W.2)
- William Owen Forth, Assistant Director, Finance Division, Ministry of Transport (New Maiden, Surrey)
- Harold Charles Hawkins, Principal, Ministry of Fuel and Power (Surbiton, Surrey)
- George Francis Hendy, Chief Accountant, Board of Customs and Excise (Bromley, Kent)
- Charles William Grove Hull, Assistant Accountant General, Ministry of National Insurance (Mortlake, S.W.14)
- James Henry Jones, Chief Engineer, Ministry of Finance, Northern Ireland (Belfast)
- Arthur Henry Keighley, Grade 2 Officer, Branch B, Foreign Office (Forest Hill, S.E.23)
- David Chalmers Lamont, Chief Executive Officer, Ministry of Housing and Local Government (Hanwell, W.7)
- Edmund Hicks McCormack, Deputy Superintendent, Royal Mint (Ickenham, Middlesex)
- Kenneth McFarlane, Chief Examiner, Board of Inland Revenue (Ruislip, Middlesex)
- Bernard Patrick McGuinness, Principal, Ministry of Food (Muswell Hill, N.10)
- Charles Edgar Matthews, Chief Executive Officer, Ministry of Health (Lancing, Sussex)
- James Leslie Moffat, Regional Manager, Midland Regional Office, Central Land Board and War Damage Commission (Nottingham)
- James Fraser Montgomerie DCM Grade 2 Officer, Ministry of Labour and National Service (Glasgow)
- John Coombes Nerney, Librarian and Head of Air Historical Branch, Air Ministry (Wandsworth, S.W.18)
- John Gilbert Orr, Assistant Secretary, Ministry of Works (Watford)
- Frederick Arthur Phillips MBE Chief Organisation Officer, Ministry of Agriculture and Fisheries (Epsom Downs, Surrey)
- Leonard Road OBE Deputy Director of Stores, Admiralty (Bromley, Kent)
- Edward Ben Ruber, Director, Ministry of Pensions (Thornton, Lancashire)
- William Alfred Simester, Regional Finance Officer, Wales and Border Counties, General Post Office (Cardiff)
- George Arthur Sizmur, Chief Executive Officer, Procurator General and Treasury Solicitor's Office (Ruislip, Middlesex)
- Leslie Stephen Smith MBE Chief Executive Officer, Colonial Office (Woodside Park, N.12)
- William George Stedman, Senior Principal Clerk, Paymaster General's Office (Streatham, S.W.16)
- Frederick George Thompson, Principal, Ministry of Materials (Bromley, Kent)
- Clarence Roy Waterer, Chief Clerk in Bankruptcy, Board of Trade (Brighton)
- John Wilson, Assistant Director, Ministry of Supply (Faraham, Surrey)
- Kenneth John Wilson MBE Commissioner, National Savings Committee (Sanderstead, Surrey)

Australian States and Southern Rhodesia

- Harold Bruce Bennett MBE ED JP Director of Industrial Development, State of Tasmania
- Arthur Edward Cowie, Marketing Officer, and Chairman of the Grain Marketing Board, Department of Agriculture and Lands, Southern Rhodesia
- William Richard Penhall, Secretary, Aborigines Protection Board, State of South Australia

Colonial Civil Service

- George Horace William Annells, Assistant Commissioner of Lands, Kenya
- Arthur Ernest Fuller, Accountant General and Collector of Customs, Gilbert and Ellice Islands
- Thomas Buchanan Low, Assistant Director of Marine, Hong Kong
- Edward Finch Peck, Colonial Veterinary Service, Director of Agriculture and Veterinary Services, Somaliland
- Constantinos Loannou Stephani, Acting Comptroller of Inland Revenue, Cyprus

=== King's Police and Fire Services Medals (KPFSM) ===
For Distinguished Service

Police – England and Wales

- Jesse Lawrence, Chief Constable, Reading Borough Police Force
- Cecil Haydn Watkins, Chief Constable, Glamorgan Constabulary
- Major Edgar Hare MC Chief Constable, Cornwall Constabulary
- George Parfitt BEM Chief Constable, Barnsley Borough Police Force
- Richard Gill, Assistant Chief Constable, Hampshire Constabulary
- George Strachan MacDonald, Superintendent and Deputy Chief Constable, Middlesbrough Borough Police Force
- William Griffiths, Superintendent and Deputy Chief Constable, Halifax Borough Police Force
- Francis John Rawbone, Superintendent, Birmingham City Police Force
- William Elford, Chief Superintendent, West Riding of Yorkshire Constabulary
- Ralph George Buckingham, Superintendent and Deputy Chief Constable, Oxfordshire Constabulary
- Thomas Allen Roberts, Detective Superintendent, Surrey Constabulary
- Lewis Henry Bearne BEM Superintendent, Metropolitan Police
- Sidney George Wells MBE Chief Superintendent, Metropolitan Police

Police – Scotland

- John Adam Ross Murray OBE Chief Constable, Motherwell and Wishaw Burgh Police Force
- Thomas Meikle, Superintendent, Lothians and Peebles Constabulary

Fire Service – England and Wales

- Arthur John Probert, Assistant Chief Officer, Birmingham Fire and Ambulance Service
- Thomas Arthur Kelly, Chief Officer, Liverpool Fire Brigade
- Ind Edward Richmond, Divisional Officer, Grade II, London Fire Brigade
- Joseph Caceres, Chief Officer, Lincolnshire (Ondsey) Fire Brigade

Fire Service – Scotland

- Thomas McCorkindale MBE Divisional Officer (Deputy Firemaster), Western Area Fire Brigade

Police – Colonies, Protected States and Trust Territories

- James Richard Henry Burns CPM Superintendent of Police, Federation of Malaya
- Edwin William Hunt OBE Superintendent of Police, Federation of Malaya
- Desmond Stephen Palmer CPM Superintendent of Police, Federation of Malaya
- Peter Irwin Montgomery Irwin, Assistant Commissioner of Police, Hong Kong
- George Ricarde Hodgson Gribble CPM Senior Superintendent of Police, Kenya
- Ian Stewart MacWalter Henderson, Assistant Superintendent of Police, Kenya
- Sandys Parker George CPM Commissioner of Police, Nigeria
- James Alexander MacDonald CPM Commissioner of Police, Nigeria
- Donald Evan Nickels CPM Superintendent of Police, Singapore
- Alastair Robert Anderson CPM Assistant Commissioner, Malayan Police, Singapore
- George Herbert Robins MBE Assistant Commissioner of Police, Tanganyika
- Arthur James Poppy CPM Senior Superintendent of Police, Tanganyika
- Lauraeston Sharp CPM Senior Superintendent of Police, Uganda
- Thomas Stewart Anderson CPM Superintendent of Police, Somaliland

=== Colonial Police Medals for Meritorious Service ===
Bechuanaland Protectorate

- Bernard Robert Sands, Assistant Superintendent, Basutoland Mounted Police, at present seconded to Bechuanaland Protectorate Police

Swaziland

- Captain Patrick Charles Temple, Superintendent, Swaziland Police

Colonial Empire

- Arthur Leslie Abraham, Superintendent, British Honduras Police Force
- Ali, son of Qsman Noor, 1st Sergeant, Kenya Police Force
- Mohamed Ali, Force Sergeant Major, Nyasaland Police Force
- Mohamecl Ali Bin Dasib, Sergeant Major, Federation of Malaya Police Force
- Alwi bin Debok, Lance Sergeant, Federation of Malaya Police Force
- Attan Bin Makaran, Sub-Inspector, Federation of Malaya Police Force
- Ayob Bin Othnian, Sub-Inspector, Federation of Malaya Police Force
- Jacob Burnett Baidoo, Inspector, Gold Coast Police Force
- Vigilant Belfon, Sub-Inspector, British Guiana Police Force
- Osmond Frederick Bower, Assistant Superintendent, Hong Kong Police Force
- Bernard Brunton MBE Assistant Superintendent, Federation of Malaya Police Volunteer Reserve
- Thomas Herbert Bush, Superintendent, Northern Rhodesia Police Force
- Cheng Hui Eng, alias J. Cheng, Inspector, Singapore Police Force
- Harry Conway, Senior Assistant Superintendent, Aden Police Force
- Daud bin Abu, Sergeant, Federation of Malaya Special Constabulary
- Michael Henry Day, Assistant Superintendent, Federation of Malaya Police Force
- Stanley Drapkin MBE Assistant Superintehdent, Federation of Malaya Police Force
- Harold Patrick Duke, Superintendent, Gold Coast Police Force
- Ernest Camm Field, District Commandant, Kenya Police Reserve
- Neville Anthony Ramon Fortune, Chief Inspector, Trinidad Police Force
- Dijara Grumah, Sergeant Gold Coast Police Forces
- Amadu Hadeija, Sergeant Major, Nigeria Police Force
- Mohamed Haris Bin Abdul Ghani, Sergeant, Federation of Malaya Special Constabulary
- Henry Wylde Edwards Heath, Assistant Commissioner, Hong Kong Police Force
- Edgar Robert Hill JP Commandant, Hong Kong Special Constabulary
- John, Ernest Hodge, Senior Superintendent, Nigeria Police Force
- Edgar Ewan Horne, Superintendent, Kenya Police Force
- Francis Gerard Howell, Assistant Superintendent, Federation of Malaya Police Force
- Nasmith Baliol Livingstone Hughes, Sergeant, British Guiana Police Force
- Stylianos Iacovou, District Sergeant Major, Cyprus Police Force
- Benjamin Igwah, Sergeant Major, Nigeria Police Force
- Tomasi Isingoma, Sub-Inspector, Uganda Police Force
- Ismail Bin Abdullah, Company Sergeant Major, Federation of Malaya Police Force
- Mohamed Ismail son of Meerasah, Detective Sub-Inspector, Federation of Malaya Police Force
- Trevor Westover Jenkins, Acting Senior Superintendent, Kenya Police Force
- Claude Randolph Keats DSO Honorary Inspector, Auxiliary Police, Federation of Malaya
- Eugene Kenneth Keazor, Assistant Superintendent, Nigeria Police Force
- Charles Herbert Keir, Acting Assistant Commissioner, Tanganyika Police Force
- Adetunji Kester, Chief Inspector, Nigeria Police Force
- Ben Bulam Khan Khanizaman, Inspector, North Borneo Police Force
- Wainwright Hilton Earl King, Sub-Inspector, British Guiana Police Force
- Kok Soo, Inspector, Singapore Police Force
- Lee Keng Jin, Inspector, Federation of Malaya Police Force
- Eric Hugh Lindsey, Acting Superintendent, Kenya Police Force
- Stephen Montague Locke, Senior Superintendent, Uganda Police Force
- Major John William Elliott Mackenzie DSO Senior Superintendent, Tanganyika Police Force
- Haitham Abdulla Maisari, Chief Inspector, Aden Armed Police Force
- Donald Matheson, Senior Superintendent, Nigeria Police Force
- William George Morrison, Assistant Superintendent, Federation of Malaya Police Force
- Muslim Bin Mohamed Som, Sub-Inspector, Singapore Police Force
- Mustafa Bin Kassim, Sergeant, Federation of Malaya Police Force
- Jameson Mweu Musyoki, Chief Inspector, Kenya Police Force
- Bernard Harold Nealon, Senior Assistant Superintendent, Sierra Leone Police Force
- No Chew Shee, Honorary Assistant Superintendent, Federation of Malaya Police Volunteer Reserve
- Yakobo Olwenyi, son of Pkum, Head Constable Major, Uganda Police Force
- Othman Bin Abdullah, Sergeant, Federation of Malaya Special Constabulary
- Leslie Howard Outram, Superintendent, Trinidad Police Force
- Fombe Pacha, Sergeant-Major, Nigeria Police Force
- Brigadier Patrick John Tottenham Pickthall MC Superintendent, Grenada Police Force
- Leslie Thomas Pridgeon, Acting Superintendent, Kenya Police Force
- Ian Saxby Proud, Senior Superintendent, Nigeria Police Force
- Peter Audley Delme Radcliffe, Honorary Inspector, Auxiliary Police, Federation of Malaya
- Abdul Rahman Bin Kamaludin, Sub-Inspector, Federation of Malaya Police Force
- Roy James Randell, Superintendent, Northern Rhodesia Police Force
- Gerald Clunies-Ross, Assistant Commandant, Singapore Volunteer Special Constabulary
- Albert Alexander Shaw, Assistant Superintendent, Hong Kong Police Force
- Gurbachan Singh, son of Sucha Singh, Sub-Inspector, Federation of Malaya Police Force
- Jodh Singh, son of Sundar Singh, Chief Inspector, Kenya Police Force
- Sardar Singh, Assistant Superintendent, Singapore Police Force
- Peter Romanov Sokolov, Honorary Inspector, Auxiliary Police, Federation of Malaya
- Athanassis Stavrou, Sergeant, Cyprus Police Force
- Peter Stephen Albert Steenkamp, Superintendent, Kenya Police Force
- Ian Turnbull Stevenson DFC Honorary Inspector, Auxiliary Police, Federation of Malaya
- Major Ronald Audley Stoute, Deputy Commissioner, Barbados Police Force
- Mohamed Taha Bin Abdul Jalil, Inspector, Federation of Malaya Police Force
- Mikili Tembo, Sub-Inspector, Northern Rhodesia Police Force
- Krishnan Theavathasan, Detective Sub-Inspector, Singapore Police Force
- Robert Clifton Thom, Acting Superintendent, Federation of Malaya Police Force
- Mervyn Douglas Alwyne Thomson, Superintendent, Nyasaland Police Force
- Voon Kian Len, Honorary Inspector, Auxiliary Police, Federation of Malaya
- William Joseph Wall, Assistant Superintendent, Federation of Malaya Police Force
- Musa Wangara, Sergeant, Gold Coast Police Force
- Lubert Watkins, Sub-Inspector, British Guiana Police Force
- John Weekley OBE ED Honorary Inspector, Auxiliary Police, Federation of Malaya
- Edward John Hugo Colchester-Wemyss, Superintendent, British Solomon Islands Protectorate Police Force
- Frank James Wilson, Staff Officer to the Commissioner of Police, Federation of Malaya
- Frederick Edward Woodriffe, Superintendent, Jamaica Constabulary
- Ya'acob Bin Bakri, Sub-Inspector, Federation of Malaya Police Force
- Mohamed Yusof Bin Salleh, Sub-Inspector, Singapore Police Force
- Mohammed Yusuf, Senior Superintendent Inspector of Police, Tanganyika Police Force
