= Trenchardism =

Trenchardism describes the domestic and foreign policies associated in Britain with Air Marshal Hugh Trenchard in successive roles as Chief of the Air Staff from 1919–30 and Head of the Metropolitan Police from 1931–35.

== Air supremacy ==
Trenchard was a keen advocate of British airpower. A key figure in the development of the Royal Air Force, Trenchard advocated the use of aircraft to destroy an enemy's war-making capacity, a view influential in developing Britain's strategic bombing of Germany during the Second World War.

Trenchard also advocated a system of 'air control' to maintain order in Britain's colonial empire.

== Domestic policy ==
Campaigners on the Left in Britain resented what they deemed Trenchard's militarisation of police in London and saw innovations such as the Metropolitan Police College not as the professionalisation Trenchard claimed but a deliberate assault on Britain's traditional style of consensus policing.

This view of Trenchardism as an authoritarian doctrine was exacerbated by specific police tactics used against hunger marches in London, including use of batons.

== See also ==
- Hugh Trenchard as Metropolitan Police Commissioner
