= 1950 Birthday Honours =

British government recognitions

The King's Birthday Honours 1950 were appointments in many of the Commonwealth realms of King George VI to various orders and honours to reward and highlight good works by citizens of those countries. The appointments were made to celebrate the official birthday of the King, and were published in supplements to the London Gazette of 2 June 1950 for the British Empire, Australia, Ceylon and New Zealand.

At this time honours for Australians were awarded both in the United Kingdom honours, on the advice of the premiers of Australian states, and also in a separate Australia honours list.

The recipients of honours are displayed here as they were styled before their new honour.

== British Empire ==
=== Baron ===
- Sir Gilbert Francis Montriou Campion, GCB, DCL For public services.
- Ernest Greenhill, OBE, JP For political and public services in Glasgow.
- Ernest Walter Hives, CH, MBE, DSc, Managing Director, Rolls-Royce Limited.
- Sir Cyril William Hurcomb, GCB, KBE, Chairman, British Transport Commission.
- Lieutenant-Colonel Harry Morris, Member of Parliament for Sheffield Central, 1945–50, and for the Neepsend Division of Sheffield, February–March, 1950. For political and public services.
- The Right Honourable Lewis Silkin, Member of Parliament for Peckham, 1936–1950, Minister of Town and Country Planning, 1945–1950.
- Lieutenant-Colonel David Rees Rees-Williams, TD, Member of Parliament for Croydon South, 1949–50. Parliamentary Under-Secretary of State for the Colonies, October 1947–50.

=== Privy Counsellor ===
- The Right Honourable William Watson, Baron Henderson, Parliamentary Under-Secretary of State for Foreign Affairs since 1948. A Lord-in-Waiting to The King, 1945–48.

=== Knight Bachelor ===
- Oswald Coleman Allen, CB, CBE, Assistant Under-Secretary of State, Home Office. United Kingdom representative on the Social Commission of the United Nations Organisation.
- Arthur Bliss, MusDoc, FRCM, Composer.
- John Reginald Hornby Nott-Bower, CVO, Deputy Commissioner, Metropolitan Police.
- Archibald John Boyd, Chairman, Railway Carriage and Wagon Builders' Association.
- Charles Blampied Colston, CBE, MC, DCM, Chairman, Hoover, Ltd. For services to the Ministry of Labour and National Service.
- Alan Nigel Drury, CBE, MD, FRS, Director, Lister Institute of Preventive Medicine.
- Captain Edward Foster, CBE, Chairman, Shropshire Agricultural Executive Committee.
- Thomas Harry Gill, President of the Co-operative Wholesale Society.
- Walter Wilson Greg, LittD, DLitt, LLD, FBA For services to the study of English literature.
- William Hadwick, Chief General Manager, National Provincial Bank, Ltd.
- Herbert Henry Harley, CBE, Chairman, Coventry Gauge and Tool Company, Ltd.
- Cecil Augustus Charles John Hendriks, CBE, MC, Private Secretary to the Leader of the House of Lords.
- Captain Bruce Stirling Ingram, OBE, MC, Editor of the Illustrated London News.
- Professor Geoffrey Jefferson, CBE, MS, LLD, MCh, FRCP, FBLCS, FRS, Professor of Neuro-Surgery, University of Manchester.
- George Legh-Jones, MBE, a Managing Director, Shell Transport and Trading Company, Ltd.
- John Keay For services to the china clay and housing industries in Cornwall.
- Norman Boyd Kinnear, CB, lately Director, British Museum (Natural History).
- Richard Robert Ludlow, Umpire under the National Service and Reinstatement in Civil Employment Acts.
- Alfred John Ware Makins, General Manager, Commercial Union Assurance Company, Ltd.
- James Irvine Orme Masson, MBE, DSc, LLD, FRS, Vice-Chancellor, University of Sheffield.
- Herbert Henry Merrett, JP For public services in South Wales.
- James Eckersley Myers, OBE, DSc, ARIC, JP, Principal, Manchester College of Technology.
- John Tresidder Sheppard, MBE, MA, LittD, Provost of King's College, Cambridge. For services to the study of Greek literature.
- Lieutenant-Colonel Herbert Shiner, DSO, MC, DL, Chairman, West Sussex County Council.
- Harold Nevil Smart, CMG, OBE, JP, President of The Law Society.
- Professor James Calvert Spence, MC, MD, DSc, FRCP, Professor of Child Health, University of Durham.
- Ben Bowen Thomas, Permanent Secretary, Welsh Department, Ministry of Education.
- Captain Ronald Jordan Thomson, President, Association of County Councils in Scotland.
- Godfrey Russell Vick, KC, Chairman of the General Council of the Bar.

State of Victoria

- Wilfrid Russell Grimwade, CBE, FACI. For public and philanthropic services in the State of Victoria.
- Wilberforce Stephen Newton, MD, FRACP. For public services in. the State of Victoria.

State of Western Australia

- Robert Ross McDonald, KC, formerly Minister for Housing and Forests, State of Western Australia.

Colonies, Protectorates, etc.

- Sir Charles Murray Murray-Aynsley, Colonial Legal Service, Chief Justice, Singapore.
- James Henley Coussey, Puisne Judge, Gold Coast.
- Eldon Harvey Trimingham, CBE, Member of the Legislative Council, Bermuda.
- Mark Wilson, Colonial Legal Service, Chief Justice, Gold Coast.
- Frederick George Richard Woodley, Mayor of the City of Nairobi, Kenya.

=== The Most Honourable Order of the Bath ===
==== Knight Grand Cross of the Order of the Bath (GCB) ====
- General Sir James Stuart Steele, KCB, KBE, DSO, MC, LLD, ADC(Gen.), Colonel, Royal Ulster Rifles, late Infantry.
- Sir Bernard William Gilbert, KCB, KBE, Second Secretary, H.M. Treasury.

==== Knight Commander of the Order of the Bath (KCB) ====
- Vice-Admiral Michael Maynard Denny, CB, CBE, DSO
- Vice-Admiral Herbert Annesley Packer, CB, CBE
- Lieutenant-General Sir Charles Frederic Keightley, KBE, CB, DSO, Colonel, 5th Inniskilling Dragoon Guards, late Royal Armoured Corps.
- General Sir Gwilym Ivor Thomas, KBE, CB, DSO, MC, Colonel Commandant Royal Regiment of Artillery, late Royal Regiment of Artillery.
- Air Marshal Thomas Melling Williams, CB, OBE, MC, DFC, Royal Air Force.
- Acting Air Marshal Robert Mordaunt Foster, CB, CBE, DFC, Royal Air Force.
- Sir Henry Drummond Hancock, KBE, CMG, Secretary, Ministry of National Insurance.
- Rudolf Alexander Little, CB, Director-General, General Post Office.
- Sir Ben Lockspeiser, LLD, MIMechE, FRAeS, FRS, Secretary, Department of Scientific and Industrial Research.

==== Companion of the Order of the Bath (CB) ====
Military Division

- Rear-Admiral The Right Honourable Edward Russell, Baron Ashbourne, DSO
- Surgeon Rear-Admiral William John Colborne, FRCS, LRCP, K.H.S.
- Rear-Admiral Robert Kirk Dickson, DSO
- Rear-Admiral Ralph Alan Bevan Edwards, CBE
- Rear-Admiral Douglas Henry Everett, CBE, DSO
- Rear-Admiral Cecil Charles Hughes-Hallett, CBE
- Major-General John Edmund Leech-Porter, CBE, Royal Marines.
- Rear-Admiral (E) Ronald Gordon Murray, CBE, MIMarE.
- Major-General Roger Herbert Bower, CBE, late Infantry.
- Major-General Cyril Frederick Charles Coleman, DSO, OBE, late Infantry.
- Brigadier Wilfrid Algernon Ebsworth, CBE, late Infantry.
- Major-General Cecil Benfield Fairbanks, CBE, late Infantry.
- Major-General Laurence Douglas Grand, CIE, CBE, late Corps of Royal Engineers.
- Major-General George Seton Hatton, DSO, OBE, late Corps of Royal Engineers.
- Major-General Gerald William Lathbury, DSO, MBE, late Infantry.
- Colonel Robert Godfrey Llewellyn, CBE, MC, TD, DL, Territorial Army Reserve of Officers, Special List, Army Cadet Force (now retired).
- Major-General Thomas Menzies, OBE, MB, KHP, late Royal Army Medical Corps.
- Brigadier (temporary) Roy Gilbert Thurburn, CBE, late Infantry.
- Major-General George Newsam Tuck, OBE, late Corps of Royal Engineers.
- Brigadier (temporary) Leslie Frederic Ethelbert Wieler, CBE, late Infantry.
- Air Vice-Marshal Arthur Percy Ledger, CBE, Royal Air Force.
- Air Vice-Marshal Walter John Seward, CBE, Royal Air Force.
- Acting Air Vice-Marshal David Francis William Atcherley, CBE, DSO, DFC, Royal Air Force.
- Acting Air Vice-Marshal Richard Llewellyn Roger Atcherley, CBE, AFC, Royal Air Force.
- Air Commodore Arthur Pethick Revington, CBE, Royal Air Force.
- Group Captain David William Frederick Bonham-Carter, DFC, Royal Air Force.
- Principal Chaplain The Reverend Archibald McHardy, CBE, MC, MA, DD, KHC, Royal Air Force.

Civil Division

- Dennis Walter Bartington, Under-Secretary, Ministry of Supply.
- Harry Augustus Roy Binney, Under-Secretary, Board of Trade.
- Charles Kingsley Johnstone-Burt, MICE, Principal Deputy Civil Engineer-in-Chief, Admiralty.
- John Irvine Cook, OBE, Second Secretary, Ministry of Finance, Northern Ireland.
- George Harold Curtis, Chief Land Registrar, H.M. Land Registry.
- George Sangster Dunnett, Deputy Secretary, Ministry of Agriculture and Fisheries.
- Percy Faulkner, Under-Secretary, Ministry of Transport.
- Charles Morrison Fife, Under-Secretary, War Office.
- Charles William Hardisty, Commissioner, Board of Customs and Excise.
- Eric Henry Edwardes Havelock, CBE, lately Administrative Secretary of the Agricultural Research Council. Secretary of the Development Commission.
- Noël Kilpatrick Hutton, Parliamentary Counsel.
- Egbert Joseph William Jackson, M.C, H.M. Inspector of Schools (Chief Inspector, Ministry of Education).
- John Cecil Wilson Methven, MRCS, LRCP, Deputy Chairman, Prison Commission.
- Douglas Archibald Porteous, Deputy Government Actuary.
- Terence Robert Beaumont Sanders, MICE, MIMechE, Assistant Controller of Supplies, Ministry of Supply.
- Algernon Paul Sinker, Under-Secretary, H.M. Treasury, serving as Chairman of the Selection Board, Civil Service Commission.
- Harold Ross Smith, Assistant Under-Secretary of State, Scottish Office.
- William Rees-Thomas, MD, FRCP, Medical Senior Commissioner, Board of Control.
- John Walley, Under-Secretary, Ministry of National Insurance.
- Colonel William Talbot Woods, DSO, MC, TD, MIMinE, JP, DL, Chairman, Territorial and Auxiliary Forces Association of the County of Carmarthen.

=== Order of St Michael and St George ===
==== Knight Grand Cross of the Order of St Michael and St George (GCMG) ====
- Sir William Strang, KCB, KCMG, MBE, Permanent Under-Secretary of State, Foreign Office.

==== Knight Commander of the Order of St Michael and St George (KCMG) ====
- Arthur Espie Porritt, CBE, LLD, M.Ch., FRCS, Chairman of the Empire Games Federation.
- Major-General Thomas John Willoughby Winterton, CB, CBE, High Commissioner and Commander-in-Chief, Austria.
- Brigadier Robert Duncan Harris Arundell, CMG, OBE, Governor and Commander-in-Chief, Windward Islands.
- Ronald Herbert Garvey, CMG, MBE, Governor and Commander-in-Chief, British Honduras.
- Gerald Reece, CBE, Governor and Commander-im-Chief, Somaliland Protectorate.
- Charles Harold Bateman, CMG, MC, His Majesty's Ambassador Extraordinary and Plenipotentiary (designate) to the Republic of Poland.
- John Cecil Sterndale Bennett, CMG, MC, Deputy Commissioner-General for His Majesty's Government in the United Kingdom in South-East Asia.
- John Victor Thomas Woolrych Tait Perowne, CMG, His Majesty's Envoy Extraordinary and Minister Plenipotentiary to the Holy See.

==== Companion of the Order of St Michael and St George (CMG) ====
- Brigadier Edward Riou Benson, CBE, Deputy Director, Military Government, British Element, Berlin.
- Neville Blond, OBE For services as United Kingdom Trade Adviser in Canada and the United States of America.
- James Carmichael, DSc, MRCVS, Member of the Colonial Advisory Council on Agriculture, Animal Health and Forestry.
- Herbert Frederick Collins, H.M. Inspector of Schools (Staff Inspector, Ministry of Education).
- Henry Howard Eggers, OBE, Assistant Secretary, H.M. Treasury.
- John Marcus Fleming, Deputy Director, Economic Section, Cabinet Office.
- Frederick Richard Howard, Assistant Secretary, Air Ministry.
- Lieutenant-Colonel the Honourable Osbert Eustace Vesey, CBE For services to the Government Hospitality Fund.
- Colonel John Skinner Wilson, OBE, Director, Boy Scouts International Bureau.
- Robert Hall Chapman, ME, MIE (Aust.), Railways Commissioner, State of South Australia.
- Walter James Garnett, OBE, Deputy High Commissioner for the United Kingdom in the Commonwealth of Australia.
- William Keverall McIntyre, MC, MD, FRCOG, of Launceston, State of Tasmania. For voluntary services at the Queen Victoria Hospital and the Launceston General Hospital.
- The Honourable Walter Eric Thomas, OBE, MC, Judge of the High Court, Southern Rhodesia.
- Edwin Porter Arrowsmith, Colonial Administrative Service, Administrator of Dominica, Windward Islands.
- Ernest William Barltrop, CBE, DSO, Labour Adviser to the Secretary of State for the Colonies.
- Cyril George Beasley, Economic Adviser to the Comptroller for Development and Welfare, British West Indies.
- Frederic Charles Courtenay Benham, CBE, PhD, Economic Adviser to the Commissioner-General for the United Kingdom in South-East Asia.
- George Digby Chamberlain, Colonial Administrative Service, Chief Secretary, Western Pacific High Commission.
- Moroboe Vincenzo Del Tufo, Colonial Administrative Service, Deputy Chief Secretary, Federation of Malaya.
- Brian Joseph Hartley, OBE, Colonial Agricultural Service, Director of Agriculture, Aden.
- George Arthur Jones, OBE, Principal, Colonial Office.
- Hugo Frank Marshall, Colonial Administrative Service, Administrative Secretary, Nigeria.
- Charles Mathew, KC, Colonial Legal Service, Attorney-General, Tanganyika.
- William Bonnar Leslie. Monson, Chief Secretary, West African Council.
- Bryan Justin O'Brien, Colonial Administrative Service, Colonial Secretary, Gibraltar.
- Bryan Evers Sharwood-Smith, ED, Colonial Administrative Service, Senior Resident, Northern Provinces, Nigeria.
- William John Vickers, MRCS, LRCP, Colonial Medical Service, Director of Medical Services, Singapore.
- Roger Allen, Head of the African Department of the Foreign Office.
- George Lisle Clutton, Counsellor at the United Kingdom Liaison Mission in Japan.
- Reginald Davies, Assistant Director-General, British Council.
- Harry Maurice Eyres, Minister at His Majesty's Embassy at Ankara.
- Brigadier Geoffrey Massey Gamble, OBE, ADC, until recently Chief British Administrator, Somalia.
- Ronald Johnstone Hillard, General Manager, Sudan Railways.
- Commander Clive Loehnis, RN (Retired), employed in a Department of the Foreign Office.
- Douglas MacKillop, His Majesty's Consul-General at Frankfort.
- George Humphrey Middleton, Head of the Personnel Department of the Foreign Office.
- Norman Stanley Roberts, OBE, Counsellor (Commercial) at His Majesty's Embassy at Stockholm.
- Robert Heatlie Scott, CBE, Head of the South-East Asia Department of the Foreign Office.

Honorary Companion

- Adeyemi II, Alafin of Oyo, Nigeria.
- Dato Mahmud bin Mat, OBE, Mentri Besar, Pahang, Federation of Malaya.

=== Royal Victorian Order ===
==== Knight Grand Cross of the Royal Victorian Order (GCVO) ====
- Sir Oliver Charles Harvey, GCMG, CB

==== Knight Commander of the Royal Victorian Order (KCVO) ====
- Brigadier-General George Camborne Beauclerk Paynter, CMG, CVO, DSO
- Colonel Henry Abel Smith, DSO

==== Commander of the Royal Victorian Order (CVO) ====
- Philip Connard, R.A.
- Ronald Martin Howe, MC
- John Douglas McLaggan, MB, ChB, FRCS
- Basil Edward Nicolls, CBE
- Eric Humphrey Savill, CBE, MVO, MC
- Sir John Mitchell Harvey Wilson, Bt.

==== Member of the Royal Victorian Order (MVO) ====
At this time the two lowest classes of the Royal Victorian Order were "Member (fourth class)" and "Member (fifth class)", both with post-nominal letters MVO. "Member (fourth class)" was renamed "Lieutenant" (LVO) from the 1985 New Year Honours onwards.

Fourth Class

- Commander (S) Richard Colville, DSC, Royal Navy.
- Miss Alice Mary Horsey.
- Thomas Leslie White

=== Order of the British Empire ===
==== Knight Grand Cross of the Order of the British Empire (GBE) ====
- Air Chief Marshal The Honourable Sir Ralph Alexander Cochrane, KCB, KBE, AFC, ADC, Royal Air Force.
- Sir Kenneth Dugald Stewart, KBE, Chairman, Trustee Savings Banks Association.

==== Dame Commander of the Order of the British Empire (DBE) ====
- Miss Marjorie Sophie Cox, CBE, Deputy Secretary, Ministry of Pensions.
- The Honourable Frances Margaret Farrer, General Secretary, National Federation of Women's Institutes.
- Grace Thyrza, Mrs Kimmins, CBE, Founder of the Heritage Craft Schools and Hospitals for Crippled Children, Chailey, Sussex.

==== Knight Commander of the Order of the British Empire (KBE) ====
- Vice-Admiral Arthur Robin Moore Bridge, CB, CBE
- Surgeon Vice-Admiral Clarence Edward Greeson, CB, MD, ChB, KHP.
- Lieutenant-General Philip Maxwell Balfour, CB, CBE, MC, late Royal Regiment of Artillery.
- Lieutenant-General Richard Nelson Gale, CB, DSO, OBE, MC, Colonel, The Worcestershire Regiment, late Infantry.
- Lieutenant-General Horace Clement Hugh Robertson, CBE, DSO
- Air Marshal Philip Clermont Livingston, CB, CBE, AFC, FRCS, FRCS (Edin.), LRCP, DPH, DOMS, KHS, Royal Air Force.
- Acting Air Marshal Francis Joseph Fogarty, CB, DFC, AFC, Royal Air Force.
- Eric Blacklock Bowyer, CB, Deputy Secretary, Ministry of Supply.
- Edward Herbert Ritson, CB, Deputy Chairman, Board of Inland Revenue.
- Robert Parr, CMG, OBE, His Majesty's Consul-General at Lyons.
- Thomas Cecil Rapp, CMG, MC, His Majesty's Ambassador Extraordinary and Plenipotentiary at Mexico City.
- Arthur Paul Benthall, a member of the United Kingdom business community in India; formerly President of the Associated Chambers of Commerce of India.
- Sir David Callender Campbell, CMG, Lieutenant-Governor, Malta.

==== Member of the Order of the British Empire (KBE) ====
Civil Division

- Frederick Westbrooke Bateson, MM, For voluntary services, to returned soldiers and to their Organisation in the State of Western Australia.
- Miss Jessie Clifton, President, Returned Nurses Memorial Fund, State of Western Australia.
- William Robertson Coull, Assistant Manager of Works, National Building and Housing Board, Southern Rhodesia.
- The Reverend Walter Bruce Stark Davis, a Baptist missionary at Dacca, Pakistan. For services to the United Kingdom community.
- Mrs Cecilia Downing. For social welfare services in the State of Victoria.
- Frederick Francis Dunn. For voluntary services to ex-servicemen and their organisation, in the State of Victoria.
- Miss Elsie Edwards, Basutoland Nursing Service, Matron of the Leper Asylum at Botsabelo.
- Mrs Susie May MacGillicuddy, Matron, Church of England Boys' Home Incorporated, Walkerville, State of South Australia.
- Mrs Iris Victoria Morrow, President, Young Women's Christian Association, State of South Australia.
- Levi Charles Moumakwa, formerly Clerk-Translator, Education Department, Bechuanaland Protectorate.
- William Ralston, Chairman, Mining Settlement Scheme, Southern Rhodesia.
- Marthinus Helperus Steyn, MRCS, LRCP, of the medical department, Morgenster Mission, Southern Rhodesia.
- Ewald Seth Esser Thomas, Assistant Agricultural Officer, Swaziland.
- Miss Eva Katherine Vulliany (Sister Eva), of the Community of the Resurrection of Our Lord. For devoted service in Parish and School in Southern Rhodesia during the past 35 years.
- Mrs Alma Wraith. For services to the Federation of Women's Institutes, Southern Rhodesia.

== Australia ==
=== Knight Bachelor ===
- John Klunder Jensen, OBE, for services in connexion with munitions production in Australia.
- Frank Keith Officer, OBE MC, His Majesty's Australian Ambassador at Paris
- John Stanley Storey, a prominent Australian engineering manufacturer. For public services.

=== Order of the Bath ===
==== Commander of the Order of the Bath (CB) ====
Military Division

- Air Vice-Marshal Francis Masson Bladin, CBE. Royal Australia Air Force

=== Order of St Michael and St George ===
==== Knight Commander of the Order of St Michael and St George (KCMG) ====
- Lieutenant-General John Northcott, CB, MVO, Chief of the General Staff, Australian Military Forces 1942–45; now Governor of the State of New South Wales.

==== Companion of the Order of St Michael and St George (CMG) ====
- Daniel McVey, AMIE (Aust.), formerly Director-General of Postal Services.

=== Order of the British Empire ===
==== Knight Commander of the Order of the British Empire (KBE) ====
Military Division

- Lieutenant-General Stanley George Savige, CB, CBE, DSO, MC, ED, Australian Military Forces.

Civil Division

- Douglas Berry Copland, CMG, DSc, LittD, Prices Commissioner, Commonwealth of Australia, 1939–45; Vice-Chancellor, Australian National University, Canberra.
- Neil Hamilton Fairley, CBE, MD, FRCP, FRS For services to tropical medicine.

==== Commander of the Order of the British Empire (CBE) ====
Military Division

- Engineer Rear-Admiral John Webster Wishart, OBE, Royal Australian Navy.
- Major-General Robert Harold Nimmo, Australian Military Forces.
- Air Commodore Frederick Rudolph William Scherger, DSO, AFC, Royal Australian Air Force.

Civil Division

- Giles Tatlock Chippindall, Director-General of Postal Services; was Director-General of the Department of War Organisation of Industry.
- Gilbert Dowling Henderson For services to the Plastic Surgery Unit, Heidelberg Military Hospital, Victoria

==== Officer of the Order of the British Empire (OBE) ====
Military Division

- Surgeon Commander (D) John Ellis Richards, LDS, BDSc, Royal Australian Navy.
- Commander (Acting Captain) Ross Valdar Wheatley, ADC, Royal Australian Navy
- Lieutenant-Colonel John Edward Barrett, Australian Military Forces.
- Lieutenant-Colonel Thomas Alexander Goyne, Australian Military Forces.
- Squadron Leader Cyril Arthur Greenwood (800), Royal Australian Air Force.
- Matron-in-Chief Margaret Irene Lang, Royal Australian Air Force Nursing Service (Retired).

Civil Division

- Rabbi Jacob Danglow, V.D. For services to the community, and as a chaplain in two World Wars.
- Florence Violet, Mrs. McKenzie, For voluntary services to the Women's Emergency Signalling Corps.
- Alfred Roy Nankervis, lately Secretary to the Department of the Navy.
- William Andrews Perrin, MBE, a blinded ex-service man. For public services, especially to the Red Cross.
- Miss Edna Mary Shaw, Matron, Women's Hospital, Crown Street, Sydney, New South Wales. For services to the Commonwealth of Australia.
- Mrs. Jessie Mary Vasey. For social welfare services, especially to war widows.
- Miss Strella Groves Wilson (Mrs. Smith), a well-known Australian singer. For voluntary services to the community.
- Mrs. Mary Tenison Woods. For services in connexion with child welfare.

==== Member of the Order of the British Empire (MBE) ====
Military Division

- Lieutenant (E) William Arthur Cook, Royal Australian Navy.
- Lieutenant Douglas Albert Holmes, Royal Australian Navy.
- Mr. Alexander Edward Leo Macleod, Senior Commissioned Instructor, Royal Australian Navy.
- Lieutenant-Commander (S) Charles Wilson, Royal Australian Navy.
- Captain Henry George Frith, Australian Military Forces.
- Captain (temporary Major) Rodney Charles Gabriel, Australian Military Forces.
- Major John Martin Mills, Australian Military Forces.
- Captain (temporary Major) Clyde Hedly Powditch, Australian Military Forces.
- The Reverend Thomas David Beyer, Chaplain 3rd Class, Royal Australian Air Force.
- Flight Lieutenant Charles William Butcher (1218), Royal Australian Air Force.
- Flight Lieutenant Alan King Martin (205163), Citizen Air Force.
- Flight Lieutenant Keith Manson Rundle (255306), Royal Australian Air Force.
- Captain John Protheroe Williams. For marine salvage work.

Civil Division

- Mrs. Frances Derham. For social welfare services.
- John Finlay, General Manager of Lithgow Small Arms Factory.
- Miss Ida Grace Francis. For services to Nursing.
- Miss Gwendoline Hesketh. For social welfare services.
- Miss Hilda Blanche Jackson, a clerical assistant on the staff of the Official Secretary to the Governor-General.
- Miss Dorothy Mary Maye, a civilian nurse. For services rendered at Kaevieng European Hospital, New Island, New Guinea.
- George Paterson, Honorary Pensions Officer, Australian Legion of Ex-Service Clubs.
- Miss Evelyn Tildesley. For devoted service to soldiers' orphans and the Red Cross.

== Ceylon ==
=== Knight Bachelor ===
- Charles Ernest Jones, CMG, Permanent Secretary, Ministry of Finance, and Secretary to the Treasury.
- Kanthiah Vaithianathan, CBE, Permanent Secretary, Ministry of Defence and External Affairs.
- Joseph Aloysius Donatus Victoria, CBE, Senator.

=== Order of St Michael and St George ===
==== Knight Commander of the Order of St Michael and St George (KCMG) ====
- Sir Richard Aluwihare CBE Inspector General of Police

==== Companion of the Order of St Michael and St George (CMG) ====
- Richard Lionel Spittel, CBE, FRCS, LRCP, Consulting Surgeon, General Hospital, Colombo.
- George Crossette Thambyah, lately District Judge.

=== Order of the British Empire ===
==== Commander of the Order of the British Empire (CBE) ====
- Suriyacumara Nitchinga Senathiraja Ambalavaner Naganather For public services in the Northern Province.
- Robert Singleton-Salmon, Deputy Chairman, Planters' Association of Ceylon.
- Vincent Steuart de Silva Wickremanayake For political and public services.

==== Officer of the Order of the British Empire (OBE) ====
- Ralph Norman Bond, Permanent Secretary, Ministry of Posts and Telecommunication.

==== Member of the Order of the British Empire (MBE) ====
Military Division

- Major Sidney Jayawardena, ED, Ceylon Medical Corps
- Major Leslie Pereria, ED, Ceylon Garrison Artillery

Civil Division

- Jayasuriya Aratchige Edward Mathew De Saram
- Somasunderam Udayar Ethirmanasingham, MP for Paddiruppu
- Sellaperumage Shelton Clarence Ferando, Registrar of Co-operative Societies.
- Warusahennedige Daniel Fernando, for public and charitable services.
- James Robert Jayetilleke, for public and educational services
- Grace Jayawickrama, for social services in Galle Town and District.
- Robert Lloyd Jones, first assistant Collector of Customs.
- Percival Warburton Kaule, deputy Auditor General.
- Edward Navaratnam, for services to education
- Victor A. Nicholas, assistant Postmaster General
- Wijewardena Seneviratne Panditha Abeykoon Bandaranayake Wahala Mudiyanselage Harris Leuke Ratwatte, MP for Mawanella
- Sa'bapathipiUai Albert Selvanayagam, Chairman, Batticaloa Urban Council
- Duncan White, captain of Ceylon Empire Games team
