= Abbiss =

Abbiss is an English surname. Notable people with the surname include:

- George Abbiss (1884–1966), English police officer
- Jim Abbiss, English record producer
