= Directorate of Intelligence (United Kingdom) =

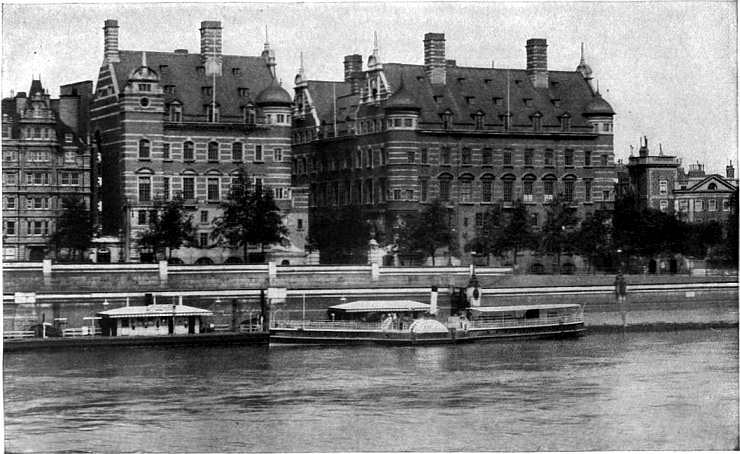
Scotland House (left), home of the Directorate of Intelligence

The Directorate of Intelligence for the United Kingdom existed from April 1919 to December 1921 under the leadership of Basil Thomson as Director. John Carter was his assistant. They provided fortnightly reports to the British cabinet.

The directorate was located in Scotland House, Westminster.
