= Joe Jackson (barrister) =

British barrister and police officer (1902–1975)

Joe Jackson CBE

President of INTERPOL
- In office 1960–1963
- Preceded by: Agostinho Lourenço
- Succeeded by: Fjalar Jarva

Personal details
- Born: 12 July 1902
- Died: 17 February 1975 (aged 72)

Sir Richard Leofric Jackson CBE (12 July 1902 – 17 February 1975), known as Joe Jackson, was a British barrister and member of the London Metropolitan Police's civil staff.

Jackson was born in India, the third son of William Jackson, leader of the Calcutta Bar. His mother was the daughter of Sir Thomas Turton, former Advocate-General of Bengal. He was educated at Cheam School and Eton College, where he acquired the nickname "Joe" after a sports writer watching him box in the final of the Public Schools Boxing Championship compared him to heavyweight champion Joe Beckett. He then went on to Trinity College, Cambridge, where he gained a half blue for boxing.

He was called to the bar by the Middle Temple in 1927 and set up a criminal practice. In 1933, however, he joined the Department of the Director of Public Prosecutions as a Professional Legal Clerk. In 1946, he was appointed secretary of the Metropolitan Police Office, ranking with the Assistant Commissioners (although a civilian). In 1949, he spent three months in Malaya as a member of the Police Mission to advise the government on problems stemming from the Malayan Emergency.

In August 1953, he was appointed Assistant Commissioner "C", in charge of the Criminal Investigation Department. He was also British representative to Interpol from 1957, becoming a member of the executive committee in 1958, and president from 1960 to 1963. He was appointed Commander of the Order of the British Empire (CBE) in the 1958 Birthday Honours. In 1962, he edited the fifth English edition of Criminal Investigation, by Hans Gross.

He was knighted in the 1963 Birthday Honours, shortly before his retirement, following which he became a director and joint vice-chairman of Securicor. He also wrote his memoirs Occupied with Crime, which were published in 1967.

== Footnotes ==
Police appointments
| Preceded by Hamilton Howgrave-Graham | Secretary of the Metropolitan Police Office; 1946–1953 | Succeeded by Gilbert Carmichael |
| Preceded by Ronald Howe | Assistant Commissioner "C", Metropolitan Police; 1953–1963 | Succeeded by Ranulph Bacon |
