= John Carter (police officer) =

British soldier and senior police officer

Lieutenant-Colonel John Carter CBE

Assistant Commissioner of Police of the Metropolis "A"
- In office 1938–1940

Personal details
- Born: John Fillis Carré Carter; 11 January 1882
- Died: 14 July 1944 (aged 62) Tavistock, Devon, England
- Occupation: Indian Army officer

Lieutenant-Colonel John Fillis Carré Carter CBE (11 January 1882–14 July 1944) was Assistant Commissioner "A" of the London Metropolitan Police, responsible for administration and uniformed policing, from 1 November 1938 to September 1940.

Carter was the son of Major Charles Carré Carter (1850–1888) of the Royal Engineers. He was educated at Wellington College and the Royal Military College, Sandhurst. Having passed out as Queen's Cadet, he was commissioned a second lieutenant into the Indian Staff Corps on 28 July 1900. He served in Waziristan in 1901–1902 and was seconded to the Indian Police Service in Burma in 1905. He was promoted lieutenant on 28 October 1902, and captain on 28 July 1909 (by which time he was serving with the 35th Sikhs). In the First World War he served as a GSO2 (staff officer) on the Imperial General Staff, reaching the rank of Brevet Lieutenant-Colonel and being mentioned in despatches twice. In 1915 he married Gwendolyn Marjorie Georges; they had a son, Captain John Ralph Carré Carter, and a daughter, Joan M. Carter.

He joined the Metropolitan Police in 1919, although he did not formally retire from the army until 1921. He worked for the Directorate of Intelligence, where he was Assistant Director under Basil Thomson. He was then appointed Deputy Assistant Commissioner on 24 October 1922. In 1933 he took command of No.2 District (North-West London), based at Paddington.

In 1923, Carter was made a Cavalier of the Order of St Maurice and St Lazarus by the King of Italy. He was appointed Commander of the Order of the British Empire (CBE) in the 1925 Birthday Honours.

Carter died in Tavistock, Devon, aged 62.

== Footnotes ==
Police appointments
Preceded by First incumbent	Deputy Assistant Commissioner, No.2 District, Metropolitan Police; 1933–1938	Succeeded by G. H. B. De Chair
Preceded by James Whitehead	Assistant Commissioner "A", Metropolitan Police; 1938–1940	Succeeded by John Nott-Bower
