= Maurice Tomlin =

Major Maurice Hilliard Tomlin OBE (28 June 1868 – 10 August 1945) was a British Army and police officer.

Tomlin was born in Brompton, London to John Leonard Tomlin and Frances Elizabeth Tomlin. He was educated at the Royal Military College, Sandhurst, and was commissioned second lieutenant in the Green Howards in February 1888. He was promoted lieutenant and Adjutant in June 1891 and served with the West African Frontier Force on the Niger in 1897–1898, for which he was mentioned in despatches. He was promoted captain in April 1900 and served with the mounted infantry in the closing stages of the Second Boer War in 1901, being again mentioned in despatches for gallantry in June 1901 and taking command of a battalion as a Local Major in January 1902. Following the end of the war, he received a brevet promotion as major in the South African Honours list published on 26 June 1902, and returned to the United Kingdom on the SS Briton three months later. He was appointed a company commander at Sandhurst in February 1904. He was promoted to the substantive rank of major in March 1907 and retired in July 1907. In April 1908, however, he became a brigade major in the Territorial Force, serving until 1912.

Tomlin was appointed a Chief Constable in the Metropolitan Police in December 1912. He was appointed Officer of the Order of the British Empire (OBE) in the 1926 Birthday Honours. In January 1932 he was appointed Assistant Commissioner "D", responsible for policy and planning. He retired the following year.

== Footnotes ==
Police appointments
Preceded by Norman Kendal; Assistant Commissioner "L"	Assistant Commissioner "D", Metropolitan Police; 1932–1933	Succeeded by Percy Laurie
