= Ronald Hillard =

England international rugby union player

Ronald Hillard CMG
- Full name: Ronald Johnstone Hillard
- Born: 6 May 1903 Durham, England
- Died: 23 March 1971 (aged 67) Weymouth, England
- School: St Paul's School, London
- University: Christ Church, Oxford
- Occupation: Civil servant

Rugby union career
- Position: Front row
International career
Years	Team	Apps	(Points)
1925	England	1	(0)

Ronald Johnstone Hillard (6 May 1903 – 23 March 1971) was an English international rugby union player.

Born in Durham, Hillard was educated at Colet Court Preparatory School, followed by St Paul's School, London, where his father was the high master (headmaster). He captained both the cricket and rugby teams of St Paul's School. Receiving a classics scholarship, Hillard attended Christ Church, Oxford, and was an Oxford rugby blue his second season.

Hillard first trialled for England in 1923 and gained his solitary cap as a front row forward against the touring "Invincible" 1924–25 All Blacks at Twickenham, a match they lost 11–17.

A civil servant, Hillard was lost to English rugby in 1925 when he moved to Sudan. He became General Manager of Sudan Railways and in the 1950 Birthday Honours was made a Companion of the Order of St Michael and St George.

== See also ==
- List of England national rugby union players
