= Alexander Robertson (police officer) =

British police officer

Sir Alexander Robertson DCM KPM OStJ

Deputy Commissioner of Police of the Metropolis
- In office 1958–1961

Assistant Commissioner of Police of the Metropolis "A"
- In office 1957–1958

Personal details
- Born: 14 November 1896
- Died: 27 August 1970 (aged 73)
- Occupation: Police officer

Sir Alexander Robertson DCM KPM OStJ (14 November 1896 – 27 August 1970) was a British police officer. He served as Deputy Commissioner of Police of the Metropolis from 1958 to 1961.

Robertson won the Distinguished Conduct Medal (DCM) in 1916 for gallantry while serving in the Scots Guards. He was promoted from deputy commander to commander in the Metropolitan Police in 1952 and transferred to "A" Department. He was appointed Assistant Commissioner "A", in charge of administration and uniformed policing, on 2 January 1957. He remained in the job until his promotion to Deputy Commissioner on 1 September 1958. He retired on 1 November 1961, having been knighted in the 1961 New Year Honours.

== Footnotes ==
Police appointments
Preceded by Sir Philip Margetson	Assistant Commissioner "A", Metropolitan Police; 1957–1958	Succeeded by Douglas Webb
Preceded by Joseph Simpson	Deputy Commissioner of Police of the Metropolis; 1958–1961	Succeeded by Douglas Webb
