= Harold Scott (police commissioner) =

Sir Harold Scott GCVO KCB KBE
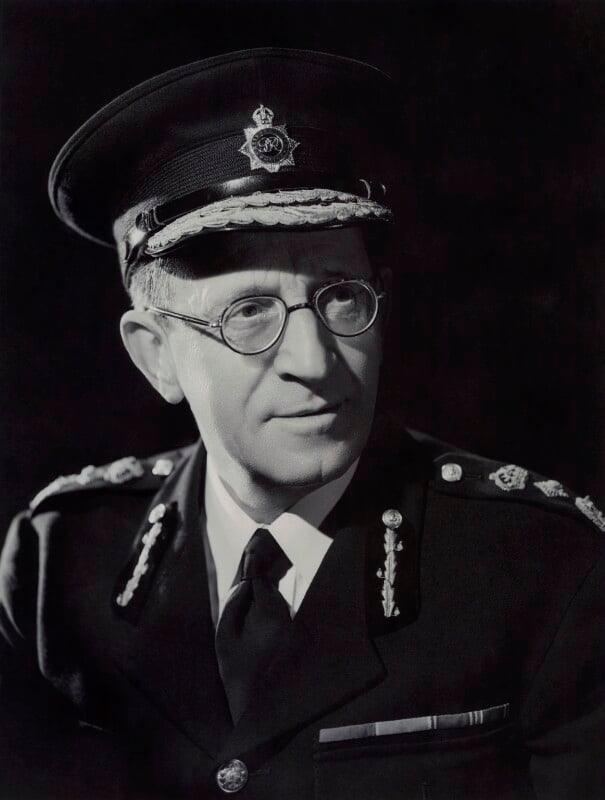
- Scott in 1947.

Commissioner of Police of the Metropolis
- In office 1 June 1945 – 13 August 1953
- Monarch: George VI; Elizabeth II
- Prime Minister: Winston Churchill; Clement Attlee; Winston Churchill
- Preceded by: Sir Philip Game
- Succeeded by: Sir John Nott-Bower

Personal details
- Born: Harold Richard Scott; 24 December 1887 Banbury, Oxfordshire, England
- Died: 19 October 1969 (aged 81) Minehead, Somerset, England
- Spouse: Ethel Mary Golledge (m. 1916)
- Education: Jesus College, Cambridge
- Occupation: Civil servant

Sir Harold Richard Scott GCVO KCB KBE (24 December 1887 – 19 October 1969) was Commissioner of the Metropolitan Police from 1945 to 1953.

Scott was born in Banbury, Oxfordshire and brought up in Bruton, Somerset. He was educated at Sexey's School and later at Jesus College, Cambridge. In 1911, he joined the Home Office as a civil servant, where he worked in various capacities including Secretary to the Labour Resettlement Committee (1918–1919) and Chairman of the Prison Commission (1932–1939). With the outbreak of the Second World War, Scott's work took on a more military capacity, as he joined London's Civil Defence Administration until he was appointed as Permanent Secretary of the Ministry of Aircraft Production in 1943.

In late 1944, the Home Secretary Herbert Morrison asked Scott to accept the post as Metropolitan Police Commissioner when the war was over. The appointment in 1945 caused a stir in police circles—Scott was the first Commissioner without a police or military background since Sir Richard Mayne (who had been a lawyer when appointed). Unlike all subsequent commissioners, he was not a career police officer.

Scott's administration background served him well in some of the more managerial aspects of the Commissionership, and he managed some considerable cost savings for the Met. He also improved the public relations outlook of the service, including granting Ealing Studios unprecedented assistance in the production of the film The Blue Lamp, which was to lead to the TV series Dixon of Dock Green, which painted a rosy view of the Metropolitan Police fostered by Jack Warner's portrayal of genial PC George Dixon.

Scott presided over several high-profile cases during his time with the Met, including the Derek Bentley trial for the murder of police officer PC Sidney Miles.

In 1951, Scott introduced a police cadet training scheme for young people aged between 16 and 18.

Scott retired in 1953, and thereafter wrote several books related to crime and policing including The Concise Encyclopedia of Crime and Criminals (1962). The section house at Limehouse Police Station, which was completed at the end of World War II, was named in his honour. An inscription is still present beside the entrance doors in Birchfield Street.

== In popular culture ==
In 2022, Scott was portrayed by Tim Key in the British-American film See How They Run.

Government offices
Preceded by Sir Archibald Rowlands	Permanent Secretary of the Ministry of Aircraft Production; 1943–1945	Succeeded by Sir Frank Newton Tribe
Police appointments
Preceded by Air Vice-Marshal; Sir Philip Game	Commissioner of Police of the Metropolis; 1945–1953	Succeeded by Sir John Nott-Bower
