= Jessie Clifton =

Australian nurse

- Born: 23 April 1876; Australind, Western Australia
- Died: 1 October 1959 (aged 83); Perth, Western Australia
- Burial place: Karrakatta Cemetery
- Military career
- Allegiance: Australia
- Branch: Australian Imperial Force
- Service years: 1915–1918
- Rank: Matron
- Unit: Australian Army Nursing Service
- Conflicts: First World War
- Awards: Member of the Order of the British Empire

Jessie Christina Clifton, MBE (23 April 1876 – 1 October 1959) was a nursing sister who served with the Australian Imperial Force during the First World War, becoming Matron in charge of the Western Australian Nursing Transport system.

== History ==
Clifton was born in Australind, Bunbury, Western Australia, twin eldest daughter of Marshall Waller G. Clifton (1849–1904) and Louisa Clifton (c. 1849–1927). She was a member of the colonizing Clifton family of Western Australia, being a granddaughter of Marshall Waller Clifton (1787–1861). Clifton qualified as nursing sister after three years' training at Kalgoorlie Government Hospital, (Note: Sister Edith Maude "Edie" Clifton was a fellow-trainee. She was born in Invercargill, New Zealand to William Edward Clifton and Emma Clifton née Willcocks. W. E. Clifton was the eldest son of William Carmalt Clifton, so they were something like second cousins. She was in charge of a maternity hospital in South Perth. In 1912 she was required to accompany a German patient to Nuremberg and with the onset of hostilities was held there as a prisoner of war, and not released until after the Armistice. She later worked at the Ministering Children's League convalescent home, Cottesloe Beach. She died on 1 March 1935, and her remains interred at the Karrakatta Cemetery.) and on occasion filled the acting positions of matron and superintendent of nursing at the hospital. On 21 July 1915 she applied for a position with the Australian Army Nursing Service.

Clifton arrived at No. 1 Australian General Hospital in Alexandria, Egypt, in August 1915. In November she began nursing wounded men from the Gallipoli campaign on the hospital ship Kanowna to No. 8 Australian General Hospital in Fremantle, where she served until December 1916, then left for England aboard hospital ship Berrima. She accompanied wounded soldiers from No. 2 Australian Auxiliary Hospital, Southall, to Fremantle by hospital ship Ayrshire, arriving July 1917. She returned to England from Sydney by hospital ship Orontes, arriving in August 1918 to No. 2 Australian Auxiliary Hospital, Southall, where she was promoted to matron. She returned to Australia aboard the hospital ship Arawa and was discharged from service in December 1918.

== Personal ==
On 18 June 1926, Clifton was involved in the death of a motor-cyclist. She was driving a single-seat motor car north along Stirling Street, turning right into Brewer Street, when a Harley-Davidson motor cycle, ridden by 28 year-old Richard Edwin Outtrim, travelling south towards the city, clipped the rear of the vehicle and was thrown to the ground, fracturing his skull. He died the same day.

Clifton was engaged to Frank Oliver Osborne, who died on 7 July 1925, and she never married.

== Recognition ==
Clifton was appointed a Member of the Order of the British Empire in the 1950 King's Birthday Honours, in recognition of her "service to the WA Returned Nurses Trust Fund".
