= Percy Laurie =

British Army general (1880–1962)

Brigadier Sir Percy Laurie KCVO CBE DSO

Assistant Commissioner "D", Metropolitan Police
- In office 1933–1936
- Preceded by: Maurice Tomlin
- Succeeded by: George Abbiss

Personal details
- Born: 5 November 1880 Sevenoaks, Kent
- Died: 16 February 1962 (aged 81)
- Profession: Police officer

Military service
- Allegiance: United Kingdom
- Branch/service: British Army
- Years of service: 1901–1919; 1940–1943
- Rank: Brigadier
- Unit: 3rd London Volunteer Rifle Corps; Royal Scots Greys
- Battles/wars: Second Boer War; First World War: Western Front; Battle of the Somme; Second World War
- Awards: Knight Commander of the Royal Victorian Order; Commander of the Order of the British Empire; Distinguished Service Order; Mentioned in Despatches (6); Knight of the Order of Leopold (Belgium); Officer of the Order of the Crown (Belgium); Croix de Guerre (Belgium); Croix de Guerre (France); Commander of the Order of the Crown of Italy

Brigadier Sir Percy Robert Laurie, KCVO, CBE, DSO (5 November 1880 – 16 February 1962) was a British Army and police officer.

== Military career ==
Laurie was born in Eastbourne and educated at Harrow School. His brother was Sir John Dawson Laurie, 1st Baronet. He was commissioned second lieutenant in the 3rd London Volunteer Rifle Corps in August 1901 and transferred to the Regular Army in the Royal Scots Greys in March 1902. He was stationed with his regiment in South Africa for the aftermath of the Second Boer War, and promoted lieutenant in October 1903. In October 1909 he was appointed regimental adjutant. In August 1911 he became aide-de-camp to General Sir Charles Douglas, General Officer Commanding Southern Command, and was promoted captain in October 1911, in March 1912 he accompanied Douglas as ADC when he became Inspector-General of the Home Forces, and in 1914 he accompanied him again as personal assistant to the Chief of the Imperial General Staff.

During the First World War Laurie served successively as assistant provost-marshal of a cavalry division and a corps. He was mentioned in despatches six times and in January 1916 was promoted brevet major and awarded the Distinguished Service Order (DSO). He was promoted temporary lieutenant-colonel in November 1917 and appointed provost-marshal of the Fourth Army and later the Second Army. He also received the Belgian Croix de Guerre in March 1918, the French Croix de Guerre in November 1918, the Knight of the Order of Leopold and the Officer of the Order of the Crown of Belgium, and the Commander of the Order of the Crown of Italy.

== Metropolitan Police ==
In February 1919 Laurie went on half-pay and was appointed Deputy Assistant Commissioner "A" in the Metropolitan Police in London, in command of the Mounted Branch and with direct supervision of the whole Metropolitan Police District under William Horwood, who was then Assistant Commissioner "A". In July 1919, Laurie was promoted substantive Major in the Army and in October 1919, he formally retired with the substantive rank of Lieutenant-Colonel. He was put in charge of restoring morale following the 1919 police strike and also organised the policing of the victory march and other commemorations of the war. He pioneered police aviation and organised the first experiments in Britain with using the airship R33 to watch the crowds on Derby Day in 1921. Under his command, the Metropolitan Police Mounted Branch training depot at Imber Court was established. He also pioneered the use of police dogs in Britain. He was appointed Commander of the Order of the British Empire (CBE) in the 1923 New Year Honours.

In June 1933, Laurie was appointed Assistant Commissioner "D", responsible for policy and planning. In this post, he planned the policing for the Silver Jubilee of King George V. Laurie's own horse, Quicksilver, was a favourite of Londoners. Laurie acquired him in France in April 1916, and he was slightly wounded by shrapnel at the Battle of the Somme. He bore his master on every state occasion from 1919 until Laurie's retirement in July 1936. Laurie also established the Metropolitan Police Athletic Association. He was appointed Knight Commander of the Royal Victorian Order in the 1935 New Year Honours and retired on 28 July 1936, with George Abbiss succeeding him as Assistant Commissioner "D".

== Second World War ==
On the outbreak of the Second World War in 1939, Laurie came out of retirement to serve as Assistant Chief Constable of the War Department Constabulary. In July 1940 he was appointed Provost-Marshal of the United Kingdom with the rank of brigadier and served in this post, being promoted to the local rank of major-general in July 1942, until July 1943, when he once again retired. This followed his suspension for ration book offences after he obtained army ration cards as well as his civilian ration book. He was convicted and fined, although his conviction was later quashed on appeal after the Appeals Committee accepted he had simply made a mistake. He was reinstated, but he then asked to retire and was granted the honorary rank of brigadier.

From 1939 to 1946, he was also Land Tax and Income Tax Commissioner for Wiltshire and was County Welfare Officer for the Wiltshire Army Cadet Force from 1944 to 1946. He was a Justice of the Peace from 1933.

== Bibliography ==
- Obituary, The Times, 17 February 1962
- Biography, Who Was Who
- C. Digby Planck, The Shiny Seventh: History of the 7th (City of London) Battalion London Regiment, London: Old Comrades' Association, 1946/Uckfield: Naval & Military Press, 2002, ISBN 1-84342-366-9

Police appointments
Preceded by	Deputy Assistant Commissioner "A", Metropolitan Police; 1919–1933	Succeeded by
Preceded by Maurice Tomlin	Assistant Commissioner "D", Metropolitan Police; 1933–1936	Succeeded by George Abbiss
Preceded by Unknown	Assistant Chief Constable, War Department Constabulary; 1939–1940	Succeeded by Unknown
Military offices
Preceded by Unknown	Provost-Marshal of the United Kingdom; 1940–1943	Succeeded by Brigadier John Mellor
