= James Whitehead (police officer) =

Brigadier James Whitehead CB CMG CBE DSO OStJ ADC

Assistant Commissioner of Police of the Metropolis "A"
- In office 30 September 1933 – 1938

Personal details
- Born: 18 January 1880
- Died: 1 December 1955 (aged 75)
- Occupation: Indian Army officer

Brigadier James Whitehead CB CMG CBE DSO OStJ ADC (18 January 1880–1 December 1955) was a British Indian Army officer who later became a senior officer in the London Metropolitan Police.

Whitehead was the son of Lieutenant-Colonel Edmund Whitehead, an officer in the Black Watch. He was educated at Dulwich College and at the Royal Military College, Sandhurst. He was commissioned a second lieutenant into the Royal West Kent Regiment on 12 August 1899, but on 29 October 1901 transferred to the Indian Staff Corps in the Indian Army. He was promoted lieutenant on 12 November 1901 and Captain on 12 August 1908, by which time he was serving with the 1st Brahmans. In 1907 he married Winifred Fanny Fell; they had four sons and one daughter. He attended the Staff College from 1911 to 1912.

By the beginning of 1914, Whitehead was serving as a cadet company commander at Sandhurst and on 4 February 1914 he was granted the temporary rank of major, as was normal for this post. On 14 October 1914, having reverted to captain, he was appointed Deputy Assistant Adjutant-General (DAAG) and on 27 February 1916 he was advanced to Assistant Adjutant-General (AAG) with the temporary rank of lieutenant-colonel. On 3 June 1916 he was made a Brevet Lieutenant-Colonel. For his service in the First World War, Whitehead received the Distinguished Service Order (DSO) in the 1916 Birthday Honours and was appointed Companion of the Order of St Michael and St George (CMG) and an Officer of the French Légion d'honneur.

In 1921, he became Director of Organisation at Simla. He was appointed an aide-de-camp to King George V in 1924. He commanded the 11th Indian Infantry Brigade at Abbottabad from 1925 until 1927, when he retired from the army with the rank of brigadier. His service number at this time was 17548.

He was appointed a chief constable in the Metropolitan Police on 1 October 1927. He commanded No.1 District (West End, Hammersmith and Wandsworth). He was promoted to Deputy Assistant Commissioner on 29 June 1933, when district commanders were given that rank for the first time, and Assistant Commissioner "A" on 30 September 1933. In this role, he was in charge of organisation and uniformed policing. He was appointed Commander of the Order of the British Empire (CBE) on 11 May 1937 and an Officer of the Order of St John (OStJ) on 20 December 1937. He retired from the police in 1938.

In 1939, he was recalled to the army, serving as deputy adjutant-general with the British Expeditionary Force in France. After returning to Britain in 1940, he commanded the Home Guard in the London District. For this service he was appointed Companion of the Order of the Bath (CB) on 3 September 1940.

== Footnotes ==
Police appointments
Preceded by Unknown	Chief Constable, No.1 District, Metropolitan Police ?–1933	Succeeded by John Nott-Bower
Preceded by First incumbent	Deputy Assistant Commissioner, No.1 District, Metropolitan Police; 1933	Succeeded by George Abbiss
Preceded by David Allan	Assistant Commissioner "A", Metropolitan Police; 1933–1938	Succeeded by John Carter
