= Archibald Rowlands =

British civil servant (1892–1953)

The Right Honourable Archibald Rowlands GCB MBE

Minister of Aircraft Production

Personal details
- Born: 26 December 1892
- Died: 18 August 1953 (aged 60)

Military service
- Allegiance: United Kingdom
- Branch/service: British Army
- Battles/wars: World War I

Sir Archibald Rowlands GCB MBE (26 December 1892 – 18 August 1953) was a British civil servant. After serving as private secretary to three Secretaries of State for War, he was Permanent Secretary to the Ministry of Aircraft Production during the Second World War. He then worked in India and later acted as a special advisor to Muhammad Ali Jinnah, the Governor-General of Pakistan.

Rowlands was born on 26 December 1892 and went to school in Penarth. He then studied at the University of Wales, obtaining a first-class degree in modern languages in 1914. He then studied at Jesus College, Oxford, with his university career being interrupted for three years during the First World War, during which he saw action as a captain in the Army Cyclist Corps; he was mentioned in dispatches and was awarded the Military MBE. In 1920, he joined the War Office as a member of the civil service, serving as private secretary to Sir Herbert Creedy, Secretary at the War Office, and then as private secretary to Viscount Hailsham, Viscount Halifax and Duff Cooper, who were successively the Secretary of State for War; Hailsham used to declare that Rowlands was the ideal private secretary. In 1936, Rowlands was seconded to the Indian Government as Adviser on Military Finance, before returning in 1939 Deputy Under-Secretary at the Air Ministry, then becoming Permanent Secretary to the Ministry of Aircraft Production in 1940.

He left the Ministry of Aircraft Production when Wilfrid Freeman conditioned his return on an equal or higher status to the permanent secretary, and his work was followed in 1943 by a return to India as adviser to the Viceroy on war administration, supervising various British government branches that had been moved to India during the war. He became Finance Member of the Governor-General's Executive Council. He was also chairman of the committee that reported into the administration of the province of Bengal, making various recommendations for improvement. In 1946, he left India to become Permanent Secretary to the Ministry of Supply, succeeding Oliver Franks. However, he stayed about a year in this position before being seconded as a special advisor to Muhammad Ali Jinnah, the Governor-General of Pakistan. He proposed removing levels of provincial administration to allow the unification of government in Karachi. His obituary in The Times said of his work in India and Pakistan that "he showed a vision and judgment which was little short of miraculous in the trying latter days of British rule and in the early days of native rule in the sub-continent. Industry and energy he had in abundance, yet these would have availed him little if there had not been a touch of genius in a mind at once penetrating and kindly – a rare combination."

After his year in Pakistan was over, he returned to the Ministry of Supply and was also a member of the Economic Planning Board. He was made a Knight Commander of the Order of the Bath in 1941 and a Knight Grand Cross of the Order of the Bath in 1947. He retired at the age of 60 and became a member of the board of Express Newspapers. He died in Henley-on-Thames on 18 August 1953.

Government offices
Preceded by position created	Permanent Secretary of the Ministry of Aircraft Production; 1940–1943	Succeeded by Sir Harold Scott
