= Joseph Simpson (police officer) =

English police officer (1909–1968)

Sir Joseph Simpson KBE KPFSM

Commissioner of Police of the Metropolis
- In office 1 September 1958 – 20 March 1968
- Monarch: Elizabeth II
- Prime Minister: Harold Macmillan; Alec Douglas-Home; Harold Wilson
- Preceded by: Sir John Nott-Bower
- Succeeded by: Sir John Waldron

Personal details
- Born: 26 June 1909 Dawley, Shropshire, England
- Died: 20 March 1968 (aged 58) Roehampton, London, England
- Spouse: Elizabeth May Bowler (m. 1936)
- Children: 2 sons
- Profession: Police officer

Sir Joseph Simpson KBE KPFSM (26 June 1909 – 20 March 1968), commonly known as Joe Simpson to his officers, was Commissioner of Police of the Metropolis, the head of the London Metropolitan Police, from 1958 to 1968. He was the first Commissioner who began his police career as an ordinary constable.

== Early life, education and sporting career ==
Simpson was born in Dawley in Shropshire, the son of Joseph Simpson, an engineer who became chairman of The Horsehay Company, an offshoot of the ironmaster Abraham Darby's empire at nearby Horsehay. The Company built cast iron bridges, railtrack and other products distributed throughout the colonies and Americas, and after amalgamation with an American company, Adamson Alliance, concentrated later production on mechanised raw material handling equipment for the maritime and steel industries. Simpson's mother, Dorothea was the daughter of Arthur Maw, of Maw & Co, manufacturers of encaustic tiles at Coalbrookdale. Simpson was educated at Ashdown House and Oundle School, where he was captain of rugby football and athletics and was Public Schools Champion in long jump in 1927 and 1928, when he set a public school record, and also in 440 yards in 1928.

He then went on to Manchester University College of Technology. He represented the university at rugby and athletics and was World University Champion in the 400 metres hurdles at the 1930 International University Games, beating the German record-holder at Darmstadt. He also played cricket and was a good rifle shot (as Commissioner he was a great supporter of sport in the police).

Due to the family's financial difficulties following the Great Depression, his opportunities for a career in his family's businesses disappeared, whether the iron industries of Coalbrookdale, or the cotton industries of Manchester (his relatives were partners in the prosperous firm of Simpson and Godlee which ran mills in Swinton employing at one time some 1,500 men women and children. In 1903 Francis Godlee had donated an entire observatory (still intact) to the city).

In his early sporting career Simpson won medals and other trophies with the London Athletic Club, Birchfield Harriers and the Keswick Athletic Club; while in Lincoln and later as Chief Constable of Surrey, he was an active member and medal-winner of the Lincoln County Rifle Club, the Surrey County Small Bore Rifle Association, the Affiliated Rifle Association, and the National Short Range Rifle League (defunct), based at Bisley and elsewhere.

As Commissioner, Simpson was vice-patron of the Amateur Athletic Association and vice-president of the Middlesex RFU.

== Early police career ==
After working in the cotton industry for a short period he joined the Metropolitan Police in 1931 and was posted to "X" Division (Wembley), and later to "E" Division (Bow Street).

An intriguing account by the writer Ernest Raymond is given in his autobiography of an encounter with Simpson as a Constable whilst at Bow Street:

But most helpful and most able of all was a P.C. Simpson, an athletic young constable at Bow Street. Twenty-four years old, he guided my steps like a father. At his suggestion I wrote to Scotland Yard for permission to go all over Bow Street Police Station, and in no great while I received a courteous reply granting my request and stating that P.C. Simpson was commissioned to give me all necessary help. So P.C. Simpson took me into every hole and corner of that famous building - into men's cells, women's cells, matron's room, detention room, charge room, prisoners' waiting room and any other place that was to figure in my story.

I still possess shelves of closely written foolscap in which he answered in massive detail my long questionnaires. As I write now I turn over a letter in which he sketches for me an elaborate diagram like a genealogical tree, explaining police hierarchies, detective methods and delegated activities not only in his Metropolitan area, but in all parts of the country.

It is pleasant and strange to see that this letter is written from a Constables' Section House and signed in the friendliest way, 'Joe Simpson'. But today I wonder how I dared to take up the time of a busy young policeman like this, and how I am daring to write of him here as 'Joe Simpson'. Because he is now Sir Joseph Simpson, K.B.E., and O.B.E., Commissioner of the Metropolitan Police."

In 1934 Simpson was selected by competitive examination to attend the first course of thirty students at Hendon Police College, beginning the course on 10 May, and was promoted to Acting Station Inspector on graduation at the top of his class in 1936, when he became an instructor at the college.

== Provincial police career ==
In 1937, Simpson was called to the Bar by Gray's Inn. In July the same year he left the Metropolitan Police to become Assistant Chief Constable of Lincolnshire Constabulary. In 1939 he was seconded (as Acting Inspector of Constabularies) to the Regional Commissioner's Offices for Nottinghamshire and then for Cambridgeshire and in 1943 was appointed Chief Constable of Northumberland Constabulary. Simpson was appointed an Officer of the Order of the British Empire (OBE) in the 1946 New Year Honours for his services to civil defence. He transferred as Chief Constable to Surrey Constabulary later in 1946. He was awarded the King's Police and Fire Services Medal in the 1952 New Year Honours.

Simpson was a fair and tolerant man. On his appointment as Chief Constable of Surrey, he had written to all his officers in his first order that

"...For my part I look forward to a long tenure of office, during which I know that I and my family will be happy, and I trust that by the exercise of fairness in all my decisions, those who serve under me and their families will be equally happy".

Simpson also expected the same high standards of others, whether officers or members of the public. Those were the standards that he set for himself and he was a great believer in discipline. He believed in a more equal police force, where senior officers and lower ranks had a closer relationship.

== Return to the Metropolitan Police ==
On 1 March 1956, Simpson rejoined the Metropolitan Police as Assistant Commissioner "B", in charge of traffic policing. During this appointment he visited USA and Canada, with the Transport Minister Ernest Marples who subsequently introduced parking meters in London. On 20 January 1957 he was appointed Deputy Commissioner, and on 1 September 1958 he became Commissioner. In 1967, Simpson oversaw the move of New Scotland Yard from the Victoria Embankment to 10 Broadway, close to St James's Park station. (The Metropolitan Police headquarters moved back to Victoria Embankment in 2017.) He was appointed Knight Commander of the Order of the British Empire (KBE) in the 1959 New Year Honours.

Charles Hasler, writing in NARPO Millennium Magazine recalls,

‘Joe’ Simpson as we all knew him never forgot his early years on the beat and was always happy to talk to any of the rank-and-file officers he happened to meet.

A limited number of female police officers had been fully enlisted since 1919, under Commissioner Sir Neville Macready, albeit with limited powers and a rank carrying the prefix 'WPC'. Simpson welcomed this, as well as the development of the roles of special constables and police cadets. It is arguable that this openness to the 'diversity' of the day was somewhat marred by the promotion of fellow Hendon graduates as Deputy Commissioner and all four Assistant Commissioners; Lord Trenchard's Hendon experiment was never popular with most officers, although actually these appointments were made by the Crown on the advice of the Home Secretary. Simpson strove, with some success, to improve the deteriorating relationship between the police and the public and encouraged the public to "have a go" against crime, although he did issue a warning against tackling armed criminals.

He was an enthusiastic supporter of crime prevention and the use of police dogs, and also greatly expanded the Police Cadets. He established the Obscene Publications Squad, Drugs Squad (1963), Special Patrol Group (1961), Art Squad (1967) and Antiques and Philately Squad (1967), laid the foundations for the Scenes of Crime Branch established shortly after his death, and greatly expanded the Flying Squad. He introduced personal radios and the Unit Beat system (1967), whereby the use of panda cars was greatly expanded for patrol purposes. He reorganised the Metropolitan Special Constabulary to integrate them more into the divisions. He introduced traffic wardens and fixed penalty parking fines.

Hasler continues,

Throughout his tenure Sir Joseph Simpson was plagued by disorderly demonstrations placing a continual strain on his undermanned Force over and above the steady increase in the crime rate...

Despite all these distractions the Commissioner also found time to oversee the most intensive period of building and refurbishing since the days of Lord Trenchard…

In his quiet way Sir Joseph was a bigger innovator than the majority of his predecessors and certainly ranks with Lord Trenchard as a moderniser of the Metropolitan Police.

He was elected vice-president of the Association of Chief Police Officers (ACPO) in 1966 and president in 1967. In 1963, he was elected president of the Medico-Legal Society for two years.

== Recruitment of ethnic minority officers ==
The first known Black Metropolitan Police Officer was Robert Branford. He joined the Met in 1838 and had achieved the rank of Superintendent by 1856.

Since 1950, Sikh officers had been attending the Colonial Police Course (or Overseas Training Course) at Hendon Police College, but it was not until 1969 that Piarra Singh Kenth joined the Metropolitan police as a regular, turban-wearing police constable. And it was not until 1981 that WPC Lee-Jane Yates became the Metropolitan Police's first female Chinese officer.

The Race Relations Act 1965 was the first piece of legislation in the UK to address the prohibition of racial discrimination, and banned racial discrimination in public places and made the promotion of hatred on the grounds of ‘colour, race, or ethnic or national origins' an offence. Widespread discrimination continued without recourse to law, notably in housing and employment. It was not until the Race Relations Act 1968 became law in October that year, several months after Simpson's death, that this issue was decisively addressed by legislation.

The first Black Metropolitan Police officer in the modern era, Norwell Roberts, joined the Metropolitan Police in 1967, during Simpson's tenure as Commissioner. Roberts' first application was refused; and following his second application the Home Office interviewed him before submitting his name to the Metropolitan Police as a proposed candidate.

Written nearly 50 years after Simpson's death, an account by University of London historian Dr James Whitfield, a former Metropolitan Police officer, criticised Simpson on racial grounds. Whitfield had retired from 'the Met' in 1999 after 20 years service having achieved the comparatively low rank of Inspector. He describes Simpson as holding "unenlightened", "racist views", which were common among senior police officers at that time, and states that Simpson openly opposed the recruitment of Black police officers into the Metropolitan Police. Whitfield claims that Simpson should be seen as the principal architect for the Metropolitan Police's failure to train officers on racial issues, and that his views on race impeded progress in the creation of positive relations between the police and London's Black community, as well as contributing to his reluctance to recruit Black police officers.

However, in History & Policy, it is acknowledged that Simpson's decision regarding recruitment of Black Special Constables was made 'in the aftermath of racial disorder in 1958 and the murder of a West Indian immigrant the following year'. Simpson and his colleagues would also have fresh in mind the 1962 race riots which lasted for a week in Dudley, in the West Midlands, and the increasing tensions in USA.

Elsewhere, Whitfield claims that Simpson's published observations on the subject demonstrated a conviction that Black people were temperamentally unsuited to the pressures of day-to-day policing, and, in 1963, an internal memo from the Metropolitan Police Assistant Commissioner Tom Mahir GM in charge of 'D' Department (recruitment and training) stated, “The truth is, of course, that we are not yet prepared to recruit any coloured men”.

A more recent account of Police attitudes to racial tensions of the time, showing how those attitudes were rooted in Colonial/Imperial policing, was published in History Today in November 2019, by Sam Collings-Wells of Cambridge University in an article entitled 'Policing the Windrush Generation'.

There were other links with the Commonwealth. Simpson's predecessor Sir John Nott-Bower had served in the Indian Police Service from 1911 before joining the Met in 1933. Both Sir John Waldron and Sir Ranulph Bacon had served as Inspector Generals of the Ceylon Police before attending Hendon Police college with Simpson, and would later serve under Simpson in the Commissioner ranks of the Metropolitan Police. Simpson's brother-in-law Sir John Valentine Wistar Shaw had been Governor and Commander in Chief of Trinidad and Tobago from 1947 to 1950.

Racial tensions were to continue in many police force areas throughout the years of Simpson's Commissionership, leading up to the 'Rivers of Blood' speech of Enoch Powell MP on 20 April 1968, shortly after Simpson's death, and beyond. In 1968 Mahesh Upadhyaya became the first person in the UK to bring a racial discrimination case to court using the recently introduced Race Relations Act 1968. By 1969, just 19 black officers were employed throughout the country.

== Death ==
Simpson was expected by some to retire in 1964, but stayed in office. He died suddenly at his home in Roehampton four years later at the age of 58, his early death probably brought on by stress caused by overwork. His funeral was held with full honours at Westminster Abbey on 29 March 1968, with all Metropolitan Police officers who were able to do so observing a one minute's silence at 11am.

At the time of his death, James Callaghan, the Home Secretary, wrote to Sir John Waldron, Acting Commissioner,

"He was an outstanding leader of men and his death is a tragic loss both to the Force, which he served so well as Commissioner for one decade, and to the Police Service as a whole which he served in so many ways all his working life."

Sir Charles Cunningham, who was formerly at the Home Office wrote in The Times of his leadership, fearlessness, his intellect, patience, tolerance, integrity and his capacity to understand others and see the other man's point of view,

"These were qualities which everyone who worked with him – Ministers, Civil Servants, members of his own service - recognised, respected and admired. They won him the loyalty and affection of all his officers – who would have done anything for him. He has left the Metropolitan Police a better force - in efficiency, in morale and in the standards to which all its members work – than it has ever been. Both it and the Police Service as a whole will miss him very much. And so will his friends."

On 4 June 1970, a memorial service was held in the crypt of St Paul's Cathedral where a memorial plaque in the Chapel of the Order of the British Empire, comprising a profiled head in bas-relief, by John Skelton was unveiled by James Callaghan, then Home Secretary.

Simpson was commemorated by the naming of the former main assembly hall in Hendon Police College as Simpson Hall (since demolished). Other memorials at Hendon include a bust (donated in his memory through subscription by serving and retired officers at the time of his death) and a portrait in oils by John Gilroy, hung together with those of other Commissioners. A memorial bench was installed by his family in Richmond Park where Simpson used to ride his police horse. Simpson's medals are held by his eldest grandson, Nicholas. His family archives were donated to the archives of the Coalbrookdale Museum of Iron by his younger son, Ben Simpson MBE in 2020. Other archives relating to his family can be found at:

- The University of Nottingham (archived letters of relatives of Joseph Simpson (1835 - 1901), edited by Amice Lee and published privately as In Their Several Generations, in America by Interstate Printing Corporation, 1930).
- The Library of Congress (Transcripts of Joseph Simpson's letters written in 1865 during a tour of North America, investigating the plight of the freed slaves and their families on behalf of the Society of Friends).
- Bodelian Library, Weston Library, Special Collections, Oxford (Simpson, Shaw and other families).
- Metropolitan Police Museum (Record of service and other documents).

== Honours ==

Ribbon	Description	Notes
	Order of the British Empire (KBE)	Civil Division; Knight Commander 1959 New Year Honours List; Officer (OBE) 1946
	King's Police and Fire Services Medal (KPFSM)	
	Defence Medal	
	Queen Elizabeth II Coronation Medal	1953
	Police Long Service and Good Conduct Medal	

== Family ==
Simpson married Elizabeth May Bowler in 1936. She was a soprano, under the training of Elena Gerhardt, and her singing tour of Germany in 1938, well-acclaimed by Hans Scholz, an eminent writer and musicologist in Münchener Zeitung of 20 March 1938 coincided with Hitler's invasion of Austria, sharpening her family's awareness of the destitution and 'ethnic cleansing' that came with the build-up to Kristallnacht and the Second World War.

They had two sons, the elder of whom, Mark, served for some four years in the British South Africa Police in Southern Rhodesia (now Zimbabwe); he resigned in 1963 to avoid being transferred from the Criminal Investigation Department back to the uniformed branch. Some inaccurate press reports say he was dismissed but his BSAP Record of Service rates his conduct as having been 'very good'. Mark Simpson then served briefly in the Rhodesian Army and the Department of Internal Affairs from which he resigned in 1964 because of imminent political change (UDI). He later served for thirty-one years in the Hong Kong Police/Royal Hong Kong Police. He died at Maidstone Hospital on 23 December 2012, following a short illness. The younger son, Ben, was appointed JP for Gloucestershire in 1971, later transferring to Oxfordshire; he was appointed a Magistrate Member of Thames Valley Police Authority in 1991 and re-appointed as an Independent Member in October 2008, serving until police authorities were abolished on 21 November 2012. Ben Simpson was appointed a Member of the Order of the British Empire (MBE) in the New Year Honours 2010 for services to the community in Oxford.

== Footnotes ==
Police appointments
Preceded by William Trigg	Assistant Chief Constable of Lincolnshire; 1937–1943	Succeeded by J H Harker
Preceded by Henry Studdy	Chief Constable of Northumberland; 1943–1946	Succeeded by Francis J Armstrong
Preceded by Geoffrey Nicholson	Chief Constable of Surrey; 1946–1956	Succeeded by Herman Rutherford
Preceded by Sir Henry Dalton	Assistant Commissioner "B", Metropolitan Police; 1956–1957	Succeeded by Douglas Webb
Preceded by Sir Ronald Howe	Deputy Commissioner of Police of the Metropolis; 1957–1958	Succeeded by Alexander Robertson
Preceded by Sir John Nott-Bower	Commissioner of Police of the Metropolis; 1958–1968	Succeeded by Sir John Waldron
