= William John Vickers =

British physician and senior health official (1898–1979)

William John Vickers CMG MRCS LRCP
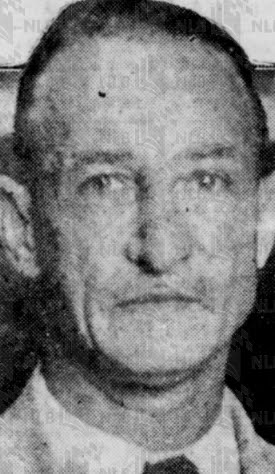
- Vickers in 1950
- Born: 21 March 1898
- Died: 8 November 1979 (aged 81)
- Education: University of Birmingham Medical School
- Alma mater: University of Birmingham
- Occupation(s): Physician and senior public health official
- Children: 1 son and 1 daughter

William John Vickers (21 March 1898 – 8 November 1979) was a British physician who served as Director of Medical Services of Singapore from 1946 to 1954.

== Early life and education ==
Vickers was born on 21 March 1898, the son of William Vickers. He was educated privately and at University of Birmingham Medical School. In 1938, he was called to the bar by the Inner Temple.

== Career ==
Vickers served in the European War with the Royal Fleet Auxiliary from 1917 to 1919 with the rank of 2nd Lieutenant. He served as resident medical officer at General Hospital, Birmingham from 1923 to 1925. In 1925, he joined the Colonial Medical Service as medical officer in District Hospital, Kuala Lumpur. He then served as medical and health officer in various posts including Senior Health Officer, Kedah, in charge of the health of State, where he was active in the control of health measures on estates; control of communicable diseases; anti-malarial measures, and setting of sanitary standards.

After leaving Malaya in 1938, he took a year off and was called to the bar by the Inner Temple. He then went to Palestine where he served until 1944 as Senior Medical Officer and Deputy Director of Medical Services. From 1944 to 1945, he served in British West Indies as Adviser on Human Nutrition to the Development and Welfare Organisation.

After World War Two, he returned to Malaya where he was attached to the British Military Administration in Singapore with the rank of Honorary Colonel. From 1946 to 1954, he served as Director of Medical Services, Singapore, responsible for provision of all public health services of the colony. In his ten-year Medical Plan, he foresaw the needs of a rapidly growing city and the increase in demand for healthcare services, and emphasised the need for state supported hospitals. From 1948 to 1954, he also served as a member of the Legislative Council, and on his retirement was described in the council chamber as "the man who has done more than any one else to make this city the healthiest city in the Far East."

After retiring to England, he served as Deputy Coroner for East Staffordshire and County Borough of Burton-on-Trent from 1959 to 1974.

== Publications ==
- Health Survey of the State of Kedah, 1936.
- A nutritional economic survey of wartime Palestine, 1942-1943.

== Personal Life and death ==
Vickers married Elizabeth Jackson in 1939 and they had a son and a daughter.

Vickers died on 8 November 1979, aged 81.

== Honours ==
Vickers was appointed Companion of the Order of St Michael and St George (CMG) in the 1950 Birthday Honours. He was appointed Officer of the Order of St John in 1951.
