= Norman Kendal =

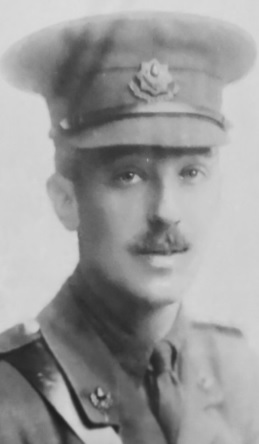
Kendal in army uniform with a Cheshire Regiment cap badge.

Sir Norman Kendal CBE (13 July 1880 – 8 March 1966) was an English barrister and police officer in the London Metropolitan Police.

Kendal was born in Cheadle, Cheshire. He was educated at Rossall School and Oriel College, Oxford, where he studied Modern History, and was called to the bar by the Inner Temple in 1906, practising on the Northern Circuit. In 1914, he was commissioned into the 5th Battalion, Cheshire Regiment. He was wounded at the Battle of the Somme in 1916, and, in 1917, was attached to the Ministry of National Service as a staff officer. He was promoted lieutenant in July 1917. In October 1918 he resigned his commission on account of ill-health caused by his wounds.

In November 1918, Kendal was appointed Chief Constable (CID) in the Metropolitan Police, and the following year, on the creation of the rank, was promoted to Deputy Assistant Commissioner (CID). He was appointed Commander of the Order of the British Empire (CBE) in the 1927 Birthday Honours and in December 1928 appointed Assistant Commissioner "L" (Legal).

In 1931 he was moved to be Assistant Commissioner "C" (Crime), holding the post until his retirement on 1 March 1945. In the meantime he was knighted in 1937. He died in 1966 at his home in Chalfont St Giles, Buckinghamshire.

Kendal is the paternal great-grandfather of content creator Ollie Kendal.

== Footnotes ==
Police appointments
Preceded by Trevor Bigham; 1909–1914	Chief Constable (CID), Metropolitan Police; 1918–1919	Succeeded by Frederick Porter Wensley; 1924–1929
Preceded by First incumbent	Deputy Assistant Commissioner (CID), Metropolitan Police; 1919–1928	Succeeded by Henry Archer
Preceded by Trevor Bigham	Assistant Commissioner "L", Metropolitan Police; 1928–1931	Succeeded by Maurice Tomlin; Assistant Commissioner "D"
Preceded by Sir Trevor Bigham	Assistant Commissioner "C", Metropolitan Police; 1931–1945	Succeeded by Ronald Howe
