= Henry Dalton (police officer) =

Sir Henry Dalton CBE

Assistant Commissioner of Police of the Metropolis "B"
- In office 1947–1956

Personal details
- Born: 27 February 1891 Watton, East Riding of Yorkshire, England
- Died: 10 November 1966 (aged 75) Bexhill-on-Sea, Sussex, England
- Occupation: Police officer

Sir Henry Dalton CBE (27 February 1891 – 10 November 1966) was a senior officer in the London Metropolitan Police. He served as Assistant Commissioner "B", in charge of traffic policing, from 1947 to 1956.

Dalton was born in Watton, East Riding of Yorkshire. He joined the Metropolitan Police as a Constable in 1911 and in the late 1920s became Chief Inspector in command of Thames Division. In December 1933 he was promoted to Superintendent in command of "M" Division (Southwark) and in August 1936 he was transferred to Vine Street on "C" Division.

On 13 February 1938, he became Chief Constable (i.e. deputy commander) of No.2 District (North London), but later that year he was seconded to the Home Office as police adviser on Air Raid Precautions. He was in charge of ARP at the Metropolitan Police until the outbreak of war. In February 1940 he was promoted to Acting Deputy Assistant Commissioner and put in charge of a district.

He later became Deputy Assistant Commissioner in charge of No.3 District (East London), but in March 1946 was regraded as a Commander on the creation of that rank. Later that year he led a police recruiting mission to the British Armed Forces stationed in the Middle East. On 6 October 1946 he was promoted to Assistant Commissioner and held the rank until he retired to Eastbourne, Sussex in 1956. He was in charge of the huge traffic arrangements for the coronation of Queen Elizabeth II in 1953. Interested in road safety, he was involved in implementing cat's eyes and was vice-chairman of the London Council of the Royal Society for the Prevention of Accidents.

Dalton was appointed Member of the Order of the British Empire (MBE) in January 1937, and Commander of the Order of the British Empire (CBE) in 1942, and was knighted in the 1956 New Year Honours, shortly before his retirement. He died in Bexhill-on-Sea, Sussex in 1966.

Dalton and his wife Susan (who were married in 1915) had a son, Donald, and a daughter, Dorothy.

== Footnotes ==
Police appointments
| Preceded by Philip Margetson | Chief Constable, No.2 District, Metropolitan Police; 1938 | Unknown |
| Unknown | Deputy Assistant Commissioner, No.3 District, Metropolitan Police –1946 | Unknown |
| New post | Commander, No.3 District, Metropolitan Police; 1946–1947 | Unknown |
| Preceded by Sir Alker Tripp | Assistant Commissioner "B", Metropolitan Police; 1947–1956 | Succeeded by Joseph Simpson |
