= Donatus Victoria =

British politician

Sir Joseph Aloysius Donatus Victoria, CBE was a British politician. He was one of the first elected members of the Senate of Ceylon.

He was appointed an Officer of the Order of the British Empire (OBE) in the 1945 Birthday Honours while serving as a Contractor in British India, a Commander of the Order (CBE) in 1948, and knighted in the 1950 Birthday Honours.
