= Moroboë Vincenzo del Tufo =

British colonial administrator (1901–1961)

Sir Moroboë Vincenzo del Tufo KBE CMG
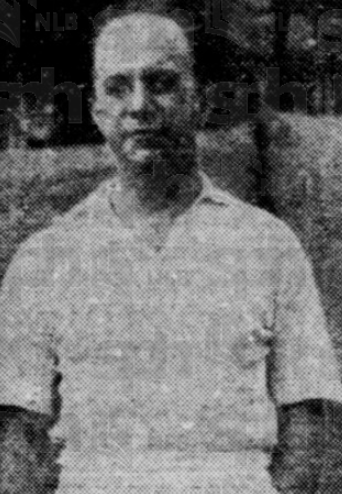
- del Tufo in 1946
- Born: 1 April 1901; Colombo
- Died: 26 November 1961 (aged 60); London
- Education: Trinity College, Cambridge
- Occupations: Colonial administrator and barrister
- Years active: 1923–1952
- Children: 4 sons and 1 daughter

Sir Moroboë Vincenzo del Tufo KBE CMG (1 April 1901 – 26 November 1961) was a British colonial administrator who served as Chief Secretary to the Government of the Federation of Malaya during the 1950s.

== Early life and education ==
Sir Moroboë Vincenzo del Tufo was born on 1 April 1901, the son of Innocenzo Marchese and Inez Marchesa del Tufo, was educated at Royal College, Colombo and Trinity College, Cambridge. He was called to the bar by the Inner Temple in 1939, and in 1948 received his MA.

== Career ==
del Tufo was appointed a cadet in the Malayan Civil Service on 7 December 1923, and went to Penang where he was attached to the Labour Office, and after studying Tamil in India, was appointed Deputy Controller of Labour, Straits Settlements. In 1931, he was appointed District Officer, Port Dickson, before he was transferred to Singapore where he served as Assistant Secretary to the Attorney General (1936), and Clerk of Councils, Straits Settlements (1938). He was appointed Director of Manpower (1940); and Director General, Malayan Department of Supply (1941), and during the Japanese occupation of Malaya, was interned as a POW in Singapore from 1942 to 1945.

After returning to Singapore from England at the end of the Second World War, del Tufo took charge of the national census as Superintendent of Census, Malaya (1946–1948) for which he was awarded the CMG. He then served as Commissioner for Labour, Federation of Malaya (1948), and Deputy Chief Secretary of the Federation of Malaya (1949), and was a member of the Federal Legislative Council. At the time when the Malayan Emergency was at its highest, he served as Chief Secretary of the Federation of Malaya from 1950 to 1952, and on occasion as Acting High Commissioner. He was appointed Officer Administering the Government on the assassination of High Commissioner Sir Henry Gurney in 1951, serving to fill the gap between the death of Gurney and the later arrival of Sir Gerald Templer.

del Tufo retired from service in February 1952, and was knighted in that year's Birthday Honours. In 1956, he came out of retirement to serve as the permanent Malayan delegate on the International Tin Council.

== Personal life and death ==
del Tufo married Katharine Holdsworth in 1935 and they had four sons and a daughter.

del Tufo died on 26 November 1961 in London, aged 60.

== Honours ==
del Tufo was appointed Companion of the Order of St Michael and St George (CMG) in the 1950 Birthday Honours. He was appointed Knight Commander of the Most Excellent Order of the British Empire (KBE) in the 1952 Birthday Honours.
