= Frank Newton Tribe =

English civil servant (1893-1958)

Sir Frank Newton Tribe KCB, KBE (15 July 1893 – 20 June 1958) was an English civil servant who served as Comptroller and Auditor General.

== Early life and education ==
Tribe was born in Bristol, the only son of chartered accountant Frank Newton Tribe and his wife, Lilly Maud Wills. He was educated at Clifton College and Trinity College, Oxford.

During the First World War he was a Captain in the Royal Army Service Corps.

== Career ==
Tribe was Secretary to Commissioner for Special Areas (England and Wales) from 1934 to 1938 and Principal Assistant Secretary at the Treasury from 1938 to 1940.

During the Second World War, he served as Deputy Secretary at the Ministry of Labour and National Service from 1940 to 1942, as Permanent Secretary at the Ministry of Production in 1942, at the Ministry of Fuel and Power from 1942 to 1945 and at the Ministry of Aircraft Production in 1945. He then worked at the Ministry of Food from 1945 to 1946. He was awarded KBE in 1941 and KCB in 1945.

In 1946, he was appointed Comptroller and Auditor General, serving in that position until his death.

He died in 1958 and was buried in Canford Cemetery, Westbury-on-Trym, Bristol.

Government offices
Preceded by Sir Harold Scott	Permanent Secretary of the Ministry of Aircraft Production; 1945	Succeeded by position abolished
