= John Nott-Bower =

British police officer (1892–1972)

Sir John Nott-Bower KCVO OStJ QPM
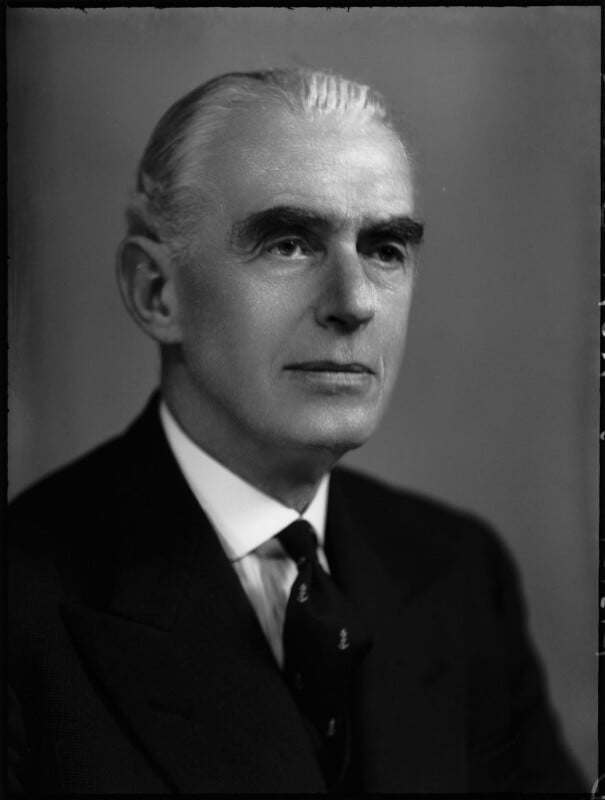
- Nott-Bower in 1952

Commissioner of Police of the Metropolis
- In office 1953–1958
- Monarch: Elizabeth II
- Prime Minister: Winston Churchill; Anthony Eden; Harold Macmillan
- Preceded by: Sir Harold Scott
- Succeeded by: Sir Joseph Simpson

Personal details
- Born: John Reginald Hornby Nott-Bower; 16 March 1892 Liverpool, Lancashire, England
- Died: 3 October 1972 (aged 80)
- Profession: Police officer

Sir John Reginald Hornby Nott-Bower KCVO OStJ QPM (16 March 1892 – 3 October 1972) was a British police officer who served as Commissioner of Police of the Metropolis, the head of the London Metropolitan Police, from 1953 to 1958. He was the first career police officer to hold this post.

Nott-Bower was a skilled horseman and polo player. He played rugby union for Tonbridge School and golf for the Metropolitan Police and Mid-Surrey. He was also very fond of bridge and fly fishing.

== Early life and career in India ==
Nott-Bower was the son of William Nott-Bower, then chief constable of Liverpool City Police and later Commissioner of the City of London Police, and the great-grandson of Major-General Sir William Nott. He was educated at Tonbridge School and joined the Indian Police Service by competitive examination in 1911. He was posted to the United Provinces and served there until 1921, when he returned to England to work at the India Office in London. On 21 June 1918 he was commissioned a Second Lieutenant in the Indian Army Reserve of Officers, he resigned the commission in 1922.

In 1923 he returned to the United Provinces as a Superintendent. He commanded successively Allahabad, Lucknow and Bareilly districts, and also served in the Criminal Investigation Department. Nott-Bower married Kathleen Buck in 1928. They had two sons and a daughter. His son, Timothy Elwyn, married Anne Cameron, the eldest daughter of Sir Donald Cameron of Lochiel. In the 1931 Birthday Honours, he was awarded the King's Police Medal (KPM) for bravery after he confronted Indian independence activist Chandrashekhar Azad on 27 February 1931.

== Metropolitan Police ==
On 29 June 1933, Nott-Bower joined the Metropolitan Police as Chief Constable (second in command) of No.1 District, consisting of A (Whitehall), B (Westminster), C (St James's), T (Hammersmith) and V (Wandsworth) Divisions. On 1 December 1933 he was promoted to Deputy Assistant Commissioner in command of the district. On 23 July 1937, he was appointed Commander of the Royal Victorian Order (CVO).

On 1 September 1940, he was appointed Assistant Commissioner "A", in charge of administration and uniformed policing. From 1945 to 1946 he was seconded to Austria as Inspector-General of the Public Safety Branch of the Allied Control Commission, and later as Director of the Internal Affairs Division of the commission. On his return he was promoted to Deputy Commissioner. He was appointed Officer of the Order of St John (OStJ) on 24 June 1949 and was knighted in the 1950 Birthday Honours. In the 1953 Coronation Honours, he was appointed Knight Commander of the Royal Victorian Order (KCVO).

== Commissioner ==
On 13 August 1953, Nott-Bower was appointed Commissioner. Although he had been a popular and energetic Assistant and Deputy Commissioner, he was regarded as a somewhat lacklustre Commissioner.

In his 1955 book Against the Law, Peter Wildeblood quotes an article written by Donald Horne for the Sydney Morning Telegraph printed on 25 October 1953 referring to Nott-Bower's role in the 'Great Purge' .

"The plan originated under strong United States advice to Britain to weed out homosexuals – as hopeless security risks – from important Government jobs.

One of the Yard's top-rankers, Commander E. A. Cole, recently spent three months in America consulting with FBI officials in putting finishing touches to the plan. But the plan was extended as a war on all vice when Sir John Nott-Bower took over as the new Commissioner at Scotland Yard in August. Sir John swore he would rip the cover off all London's filth spots.... Under laxer police methods before the US-inspired plan began, and before Sir John moved into the top job at the Yard as a man with a mission, Montagu and his film-director friend Kenneth Hume might never have been charged with grave offences against Boy Scouts.... Sir John swung into action on a nationwide scale. He enlisted the support of local police throughout England to step up the number of arrests for homosexual offences. For many years past the police had turned a blind eye to male vice. They made arrests only when definite complaints were made from innocent people, or where homosexuality had encourages other crimes. They knew the names of thousands of perverts – many of high social position and some world famous – but they took no action. Now, meeting Sir John's demands, they are making it a priority job to increase the number of arrests....

The Special Branch began compiling a "Black Book" of known perverts in influential Government jobs after the disappearance of the diplomats Donald Maclean and Guy Burgess, who were known to have pervert associates. Now comes the difficult task of side-tracking these men into less important jobs – or putting them behind bars."

He introduced few reforms or innovations. He did set up the Research and Planning Branch and the Metropolitan and Provincial Regional Crime Squad and centralised traffic control in response to rising private car ownership. He did little to combat the rising crime rate, however; he refused to address the outdated hardline attitudes of many senior detectives, which were becoming increasingly out of step with postwar society; and he did not support his men in their claims for better pay and conditions. Police pay fell rapidly below inflation and rates of pay in the private sector. This caused recruiting problems and the force became seriously under strength. Nott-Bower was regarded by many of his officers as a pleasant but ineffectual man. He retired in August 1958 and Chairman of the fire alarm manufacturer Auto Call Company in April 1960.

== Honours ==

Ribbon	Description	Notes
	Royal Victorian Order (KCVO)	Knight Commander 1953 Coronation Honours List; Commander (CVO) 23 July 1937
	Knight Bachelor	1950 King's Birthday Honours List
	Order of Saint John (OStJ)	Officer; 24 June 1949
	King's Police Medal	1931 Birthday Honours List
	British War Medal	
	Defence Medal	
	King George V Silver Jubilee Medal	6 May 1935
	King George VI Coronation Medal	12 May 1937
	Queen Elizabeth II Coronation Medal	2 June 1953
	Police Long Service and Good Conduct Medal	

== Notes ==
Police appointments
Preceded by James Whitehead	Chief Constable, No.1 District, Metropolitan Police; 1933	Succeeded by Unknown
Preceded by George Abbiss	Deputy Assistant Commissioner, No.1 District, Metropolitan Police; 1933–1940	Succeeded by Unknown
Preceded by John Carter	Assistant Commissioner "A", Metropolitan Police; 1940–1945	Succeeded by John Ferguson
Preceded by Sir Maurice Drummond	Deputy Commissioner of Police of the Metropolis; 1946–1953	Succeeded by Ronald Howe
Preceded by Sir Harold Scott	Commissioner of Police of the Metropolis; 1953–1958	Succeeded by Sir Joseph Simpson
