= Philip Margetson =

British soldier and senior police officer

Major Sir Philip Margetson KCVO MC QPM

Assistant Commissioner of Police of the Metropolis "A"
- In office 1946–1957

Personal details
- Born: Philip Reginald Margetson; 2 January 1894
- Died: 5 December 1985 (aged 91)
- Occupation: British Army officer

Major Sir Philip Reginald Margetson KCVO MC QPM (2 January 1894 – 5 December 1985) was an Assistant Commissioner of the London Metropolitan Police.

== Military service ==
Margetson was educated at Marlborough and then went on to the Royal Military College, Sandhurst. In 1915 he was commissioned as a second lieutenant into the Royal Scots Fusiliers. He was promoted lieutenant on 25 December 1915, and temporary captain on 20 February 1916. He reverted to Lieutenant on 27 April 1916. In the 1916 King's Birthday Honours he was awarded the Military Cross for gallantry in action. In January 1918 he became an instructor with an officer cadet unit as an Acting Captain. In 1919 he became second-in-command of the 1/4th Battalion Royal Scots Fusiliers (Territorial Force) (which was then part of the Army of Occupation) in the rank of Acting Major. On 1 January 1923 he was finally promoted to the substantive rank of captain, while serving as adjutant of the 1st Battalion. On 1 October 1928 he became Staff Captain of the 54th (East Anglian) Division, an appointment he held until 1 October 1932. On 1 January 1933 he became a Brevet Major.

== Police career ==
On 31 December 1933, Margetson retired from the Army, transferring to the Regular Army Reserve of Officers. He joined the Metropolitan Police, entering directly as a chief inspector and taking the position of senior administrative officer at No.4 District (South London) headquarters on 1 December 1933. He was later promoted to Superintendent and took command of "R" Division (Blackheath). In August 1936 he was promoted to Chief Constable and became deputy commander of No.2 District (North London). In February 1938 he was transferred to the same post in No.1 District (West Central London), and in October 1938 to the same post in No.3 District (East London). In February 1940 he was promoted to Deputy Assistant Commissioner at "A" Department (Operations and Administration) of Scotland Yard and in August 1940 he was given command of No.1 District. In March 1946 he received the new rank of commander.

In June 1946, he was promoted to Assistant Commissioner "D" (Personnel and Training) and in October he transferred to become Assistant Commissioner "A" (Operations and Administration). In 1950, he applied for the vacant office of Commissioner of the City of London Police. The job went to one of his colleagues, Arthur Young, who had succeeded him as Assistant Commissioner "D".

In 1947 he was made an Officer of the Venerable Order of Saint John. He was created a Commander of the Royal Victorian Order (CVO) in the 1948 New Year Honours and raised to Knight Commander (KCVO) in the 1953 Coronation Honours. In 1955 he was promoted to Commander of the Venerable Order of Saint John. He received the Queen's Police Medal (QPM) for Distinguished Service in the 1956 Queen's Birthday Honours.

== Later life ==
He retired on 2 January 1957 (his 63rd birthday) and joined the board of Securicor, serving as chairman from 1960 to 1973, when he became honorary president. He was instrumental in the disarming of cash in transit security guards in 1964, having always disliked the idea of private guards carrying firearms.

In 1918, Margetson married Diana Thornycroft, daughter of Sir John Thornycroft. They had two sons; the elder was killed in action in 1943.

The National Portrait Gallery holds two 1957 photographic portraits of Margetson by Elliott & Fry.

== Notes ==
Police appointments
| Preceded by Unknown | Chief Constable, No.2 District, Metropolitan Police; 1936–1938 | Succeeded by Henry Dalton |
| Preceded by J. Goldie | Chief Constable, No.1 District, Metropolitan Police; 1938 | Succeeded by Arthur Conyers-Baker |
| Preceded by Unknown | Chief Constable, No.3 District, Metropolitan Police; 1938–1940 | Succeeded by Unknown |
| Preceded by Unknown | Deputy Assistant Commissioner, No.1 District, Metropolitan Police; 1940–1946 | Succeeded by Unknown |
| Preceded by First incumbent | Commander, No.1 District, Metropolitan Police; 1946 | Succeeded by Unknown |
| Preceded by Sir George Abbiss | Assistant Commissioner "D", Metropolitan Police; 1946 | Succeeded by Arthur Young |
| Preceded by John Ferguson | Assistant Commissioner "A", Metropolitan Police; 1946–1957 | Succeeded by Alexander Robertson |
