= George Abbiss =

British police officer

Abbiss in September 1942.

Sir George Abbiss OBE (31 January 1884 – 6 October 1966) was a British police officer in the London Metropolitan Police.

Abbiss was born in Pirton, Hertfordshire. He joined the Metropolitan Police as a constable in 1905 and was a sub-divisional inspector in Central London by 1924, and a chief inspector by 1926. By June 1929, when he was appointed Member of the Order of the British Empire (MBE) in the Metropolitan Police Centenary Honours, he was a superintendent, and he was promoted chief constable in 1930. For several years, he served as commandant of the Police Training School at Peel House.

He was appointed Officer of the Order of the British Empire (OBE) in the 1933 Birthday Honours and promoted deputy assistant commissioner on 30 September 1933. In this rank, he briefly commanded No. 1 District, consisting of A (Whitehall), B (Westminster), C (St James's), T (Hammersmith), and V (Wandsworth) Divisions.

In July 1936, he was appointed Assistant Commissioner "D", in charge of policy and planning. He is considered responsible for the invention and subsequent adoption of the 999 emergency phone number, and also the proliferation of the blue police boxes, which later spread across the country.

He was knighted in the 1941 New Year Honours and retired on 8 June 1946, the day after the death of his wife, Alice Elizabeth (née Day), to whom he had been married since 1908. From 1948 to 1960, he served as assistant police adviser and then police adviser to the Secretary of State for the Colonies. He also served as deputy commissioner, No. 1 District, St John Ambulance.

== Footnotes ==
Police appointments
Preceded by James Whitehead	Deputy Assistant Commissioner, No.1 District, Metropolitan Police; 1933	Succeeded by John Nott-Bower
Preceded by Sir Percy Laurie	Assistant Commissioner "D", Metropolitan Police; 1936–1946	Succeeded by Philip Margetson
