= John Seymour Mellor =

British army officer (1883–1962)

Brigadier John Seymour Mellor (14 September 1883 - 26 September 1962) was a British Army officer in both world wars.

== Life ==
Born in Edinburgh, his first commission was on 19 October 1902 as a Second Lieutenant in the King's Royal Rifle Corps, rising to Lieutenant (17 October 1907) and Captain (9 December 1914) in the same regiment. He served in the Boer War and was with 5th Battalion, Oxfordshire and Buckinghamshire Light Infantry in Mesopotamia when he was captured and held at Kastamonu. He was awarded the Military Cross in the 1917 New Year Honours and also received the Croix de Guerre with gold star during that conflict. His brother Vincent died of wounds or sickness after service in the Middle East with 5th Battalion, King’s Royal Rifle Corps.

On 12 February 1919 he was made Temporary Lieutenant Colonel and posted to be Deputy Provost Marshal to 2nd Army in France, a rank he held until 20 October 1920. On retirement on 5 March 1921 he was granted the substantive rank of Lieutenant Colonel. He spent seven years as a King's Messenger sometime before 1943.

He was given the rank of Local Major General on 21 July 1943 and five days later succeeded Percy Laurie as Provost Marshal for the whole British Army. In 1946 he returned to the role of Chief Constable of the War Department Constabulary, which he had also held before 1943. In the 1946 Birthday Honours he was made a Commander of the Order of the British Empire, having already been given the OBE in those of 1919.

Military offices
Preceded by Percy Laurie	Provost-Marshal of the United Kingdom; 1943–1943	Succeeded by Unknown
