= Wyndham Childs =

British Army Major-General (1876–1946)

Major-General Sir Wyndham Childs KCMG KBE CB
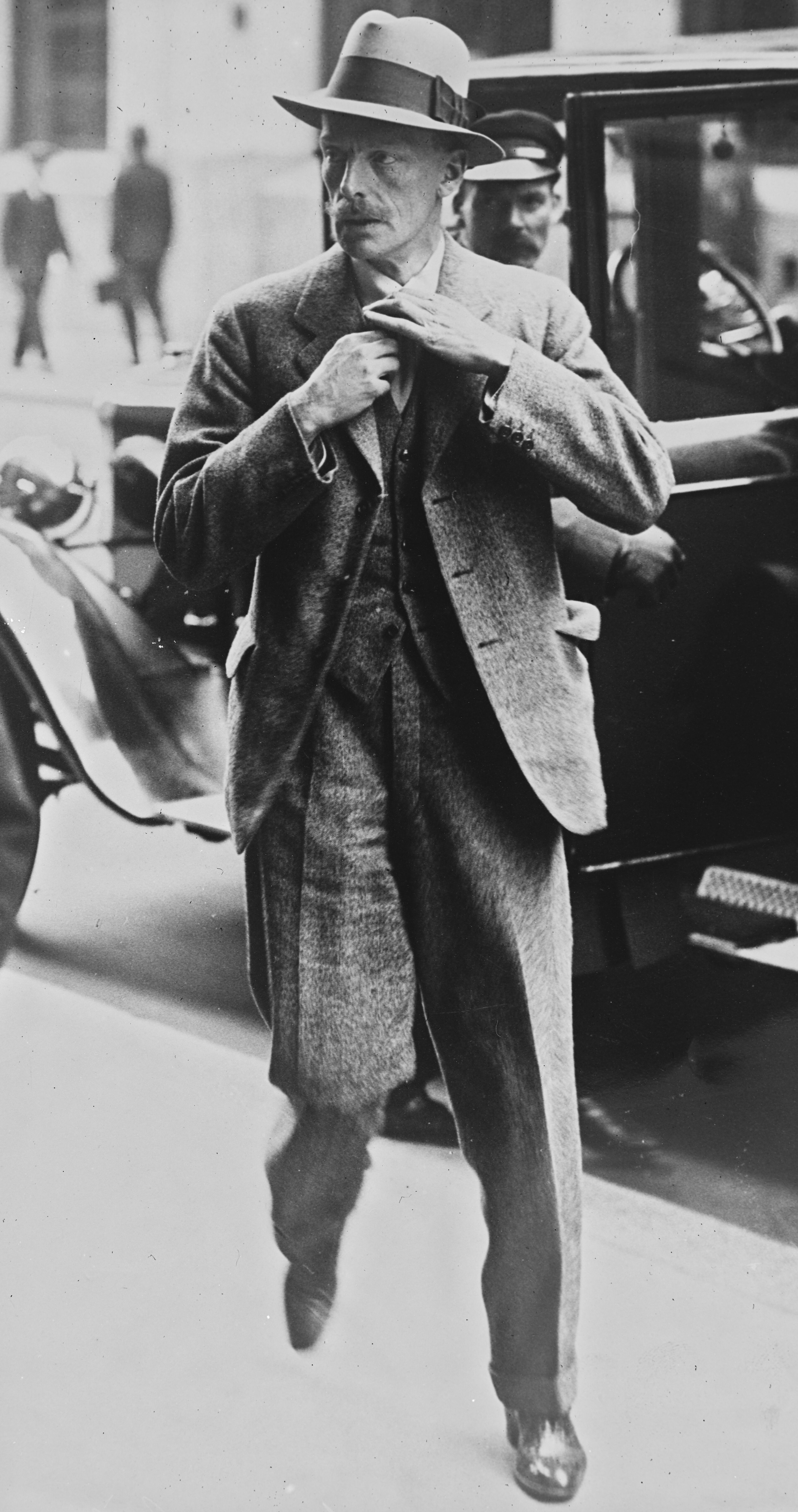
- Born: 15 December 1876
- Died: 27 November 1946 (aged 69)
- Military career
- Allegiance: United Kingdom
- Branch: British Army
- Service years: 1900–1922
- Rank: Major-General
- Conflicts: Second Boer War; First World War
- Awards: Knight Commander of the Order of St Michael and St George; Knight Commander of the Order of the British Empire; Companion of the Order of the Bath

Major-General Sir Borlase Elward Wyndham Childs, KCMG, KBE, CB (15 December 1876 – 27 November 1946) was a British Army officer who also served as Assistant Commissioner of Police of the Metropolis from 1921 to 1928.

== Military career ==
Childs was born in Cornwall, the son of a solicitor. He initially entered the law himself, as an articled clerk to his father. He was also a captain in the 2nd Volunteer Battalion of the Duke of Cornwall's Light Infantry (DCLI). When the Second Boer War broke out he volunteered for overseas service, but was turned down. He decided to volunteer for regular service instead, intending to return to the law after the war, and in 1900 was commissioned into the regular DCLI, being immediately posted to the 1st Battalion in Dum Dum, India. Shortly afterwards, the battalion moved to Ceylon as a guard battalion for the Boer prisoner of war camp. After two years, the battalion was finally posted to South Africa, where Childs was appointed adjutant and quartermaster of the rest camp at Stellenbosch. There he came to the attention of Colonel Nevil Macready, then Chief Staff Officer at Cape Colony, who appointed him garrison adjutant of Cape Town Castle. He was promoted lieutenant in April 1904 and returned to England in 1905, where he became adjutant of his battalion. He transferred to the Royal Irish Regiment as a captain in 1910.

In February 1911 Childs was seconded to the War Office as a staff captain. In November 1910, he accompanied his old friend, Macready, by then Director of Personal Services, as his staff officer to Tonypandy in South Wales, where rioting had broken out. In February 1912, he was promoted to the brevet rank of major. In April 1914, he was appointed deputy assistant adjutant-general at the War Office and, in September 1914, he was appointed assistant adjutant-general with the British Expeditionary Force (BEF) and promoted to the temporary rank of lieutenant-colonel and shortly afterwards to the temporary rank of colonel. While with the BEF, he instituted court martial reforms that increased the remission of death sentences for deserters to 89 per cent of all those sentenced to death by military courts.

In 1916, Childs returned to the War Office as assistant adjutant-general, mainly dealing with conscientious objectors, and later the same year was appointed Director of Personal Services, in charge of Army discipline. In September 1915 he was given the substantive rank of major in the DCLI, in 1916 he became a brevet lieutenant-colonel, in 1917 a brevet colonel, and in 1919 a temporary major-general. In 1919, he also became a deputy adjutant-general.

== Police career ==
Childs was appointed Assistant Commissioner "C" (Crime) in December 1921. He retired from the army in December 1922 with the honorary rank of major-general. While Assistant Commissioner he attempted with some success to stamp out the illegal arms trade. He resigned from the Metropolitan Police on 6 November 1928, over the Sir Leo Chiozza Money incident.

Childs was appointed Companion of the Order of St Michael and St George in 1916, Companion of the Order of the Bath in 1918, Knight Commander of the Order of St Michael and St George in 1919, and Knight Commander of the Order of the British Empire in February 1921.

Childs was appointed High Sheriff of Cambridgeshire and Huntingdonshire for 1932–33 when he was living in Thriplow House, Thriplow, Cambridgeshire. He died in the Stoke Newington district of London in 1946. He had married Ethel (Young) Allanson in 1925.

== Works ==
- Episodes and reflections: being some records from the life of Major-General Sir Wyndham Childs, K.C.M.G., K.B.E., C.B., one time second lieut., 2nd Volunteer Battalion, the Duke of Cornwall's Light Infantry, Cassell, 1930
- John Bull's Book of Pitfalls, Pryor Publications, 1999, ISBN 0-946014-80-9

== Footnotes ==
Military offices
Preceded by Finlay Beatson	Director of Personal Services, British Army; 1916–1921	Succeeded by Felix Ready
Police appointments
Preceded by Sir Basil Thomson	Assistant Commissioner "C", Metropolitan Police; 1921–1928	Succeeded by Trevor Bigham
