= Trevor Bigham =

English barrister (1876-1954)

The Honourable Sir Trevor Bigham KBE CB
- Bigham in 1933

Deputy Commissioner of Police of the Metropolis
- In office 1931 – January 1935

Assistant Commissioner of Police of the Metropolis "C"
- In office 1928–1931

Assistant Commissioner of Police of the Metropolis "L"
- In office 29 January 1914 – 1928

Personal details
- Born: Frank Trevor Roger Bigham; 22 May 1876
- Died: 23 November 1954 (aged 78)
- Occupation: Barrister

Sir Frank Trevor Roger Bigham, KBE, CB (22 May 1876 – 23 November 1954) was an English barrister, an Assistant Commissioner of the London Metropolitan Police from 1914 to 1931, and Deputy Commissioner from 1931 to 1935. He was the first officer to hold the position of Deputy Commissioner as a separate rank and not as an honorary title while also serving as an Assistant Commissioner.

== Early life and education ==
Trevor Bigham was the third son (although the second surviving) of the judge, John Charles Bigham, 1st Viscount Mersey, and was entitled to the style "The Honourable" after 1910 due to his father's peerage. He was a King's Scholar at Eton College from 1890 to 1895, and then went up to Magdalen College, Oxford. He took a second in Mods in 1895 and a first in Literae Humaniores in 1899. In 1901, he was called to the Bar by the Middle Temple. On 24 January 1900, he was commissioned a Second Lieutenant in the 24th (Territorial Force) Battalion, Middlesex Regiment.

== Police career ==
On 4 December 1909, Bigham was appointed the Chief Constable of the Metropolitan Police Criminal Investigation Department (CID). On 29 January 1914, he succeeded Frederick Bullock as Assistant Commissioner "L", in charge of the Legal Department of Scotland Yard. During the First World War, he spent most of his time dealing with the control of aliens, and in 1919 he was appointed Companion of the Order of the Bath (CB).

On 6 November 1922, Bigham and his colleague, Assistant Commissioner Frank Elliott, were sent a box of chocolate éclairs poisoned with arsenic. However, they were suspicious and did not eat them. Walter Tatam, who had a history of mental problems, was later found guilty of attempted murder.

In 1928, he became Assistant Commissioner "C", in charge of CID. He was appointed Knight Commander of the Order of the British Empire (KBE) in the Metropolitan Police Centenary Honours of 3 June 1929.

Following the sudden death of Sir Charles Royds on 5 January 1931, Bigham succeeded him as Assistant Commissioner "A", in charge of administration and uniformed operations and with the courtesy title of Deputy Commissioner. He also immediately became Acting Commissioner, as Lord Byng was absent on medical leave in France. Shortly afterwards, following a reorganisation, he became solely Deputy Commissioner, being succeeded as Assistant Commissioner "A" by Lieutenant-Colonel David Allan. Bigham retired in January 1935.

== Family ==
Bigham married, at Temple Church, London, on 17 December 1901, Frances Leonora Tomlin. They had two daughters. She died in 1927, and four years later he married Edith Drysdale, a civilian official at Scotland Yard.

== Footnotes ==
Police appointments
Preceded by Frederick Bullock	Chief Constable (CID), Metropolitan Police; 1909–1914	Succeeded by Norman Kendal; 1918–1919
Preceded by Frederick Bullock	Assistant Commissioner "L", Metropolitan Police; 1914–1928	Succeeded by Norman Kendal
Preceded by Sir Wyndham Childs	Assistant Commissioner "C", Metropolitan Police; 1928–1931	Succeeded by Norman Kendal
Preceded by Sir Charles Royds	Assistant Commissioner "A", Metropolitan Police; 1931	Succeeded by David Allan
Preceded by Sir Charles Royds	Deputy Commissioner of Police of the Metropolis; 1931–1935	Succeeded by Maurice Drummond
