= Hugh Trenchard as Metropolitan Police Commissioner =

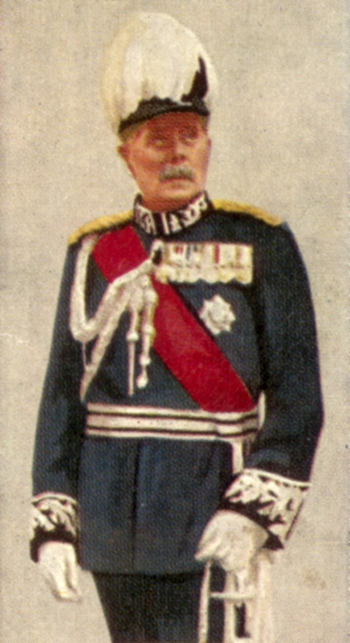
Trenchard as Commissioner of the Metropolitan Police

Hugh Trenchard served as Metropolitan Police Commissioner from 1931 to 1935.

== Appointment ==
After Trenchard had retired from the Royal Air Force in 1930, he largely disappeared from public life. However, in March 1931, the British Prime Minister Ramsay MacDonald asked Trenchard to take the post of Metropolitan Police Commissioner, which Trenchard declined. MacDonald had been concerned about unrest in the police and Trenchard was seen as strong-minded military man. By October the political crisis resulting from the Great Depression had deepened and when MacDonald offered the post again, Trenchard accepted.

== Early reforms ==
One of Trenchard's early reforms was the abolition of the scheduled beat system and in 1933 he instigated changes for the improvement of police residences known as section houses.

In May 1932, Trenchard first annual report as Commissioner was published. The report proposed sweeping changes and indirectly called into question the reliability of the police in a major emergency. After adverse reactions in the press and questions in Parliament, the Home Secretary Sir John Gilmour stated that Trenchard's report would be published as a White Paper, giving MPs an opportunity to debate the issues.

In very quick order the White Paper was turned into a Government Bill. The first two clauses of the Bill, which proposed to increase the number of assistant commissioners from four to five and lower the age of retirement for senior officers, did not prove too controversial. However, the clauses which set out limitations on membership of the Police Federation were hotly debated and characterised by left-wing politicians as "fascist". Additionally, the proposed introduction of ten-year employment terms for some new constables was met with considerable opposition. The bill was enacted in 1933 as the Metropolitan Police Act.

== Hendon Police College ==
Perhaps Trenchard's most well known achievement during his time as Commissioner was the establishment of Hendon Police College. Not long after his appointment, Trenchard decided that the recruitment and training methods of Metropolitan Police were not conducive to developing senior leaders from within the Force. He therefore envisaged a Metropolitan Police college that could help to produce such leaders by training the best selected from the ranks, as well as directly recruited educated men from school and university. Trenchard also wanted to create a new police rank of junior inspector to which Hendon's graduates would be promoted before later going on to the rank of Inspector. Although Trenchard's plans were criticised as a militarising step, the Hendon College was opened in 1934.

Today, the College principally provides initial training to police recruits as opposed to only those selected for advancement to the higher ranks.

== Departure ==
In his final few months, Trenchard was made a Knight Grand Cross of the Royal Victorian Order and in November 1935, Trenchard departed the Metropolitan Police, having wanted to relinquish his post the previous year. He was succeeded by Air Vice-Marshal Sir Philip Game, whom Trenchard nominated as his preferred replacement.

== Notes ==
=== References ===
- Browne, Douglas (1956). "Chapter 26. Lord Trenchard". The Rise of Scotland Yard. London: George G Harrap & Co. Ltd.
- Boyle, Andrew (1962). "Chapters 19 Police Reformer and 20 Police Administrator". Trenchard Man of Vision. St James's Place, London: Collins.
- Hirschel, J. David; Wakefield, William O. (1995). Criminal Justice in England and the United States. Westport, Connecticut and London: Greenwood Publishing Group. ISBN 0-275-94133-7.
