= Peel House =

Building in London, England

Coordinates: 51.49122°N 0.13188°W

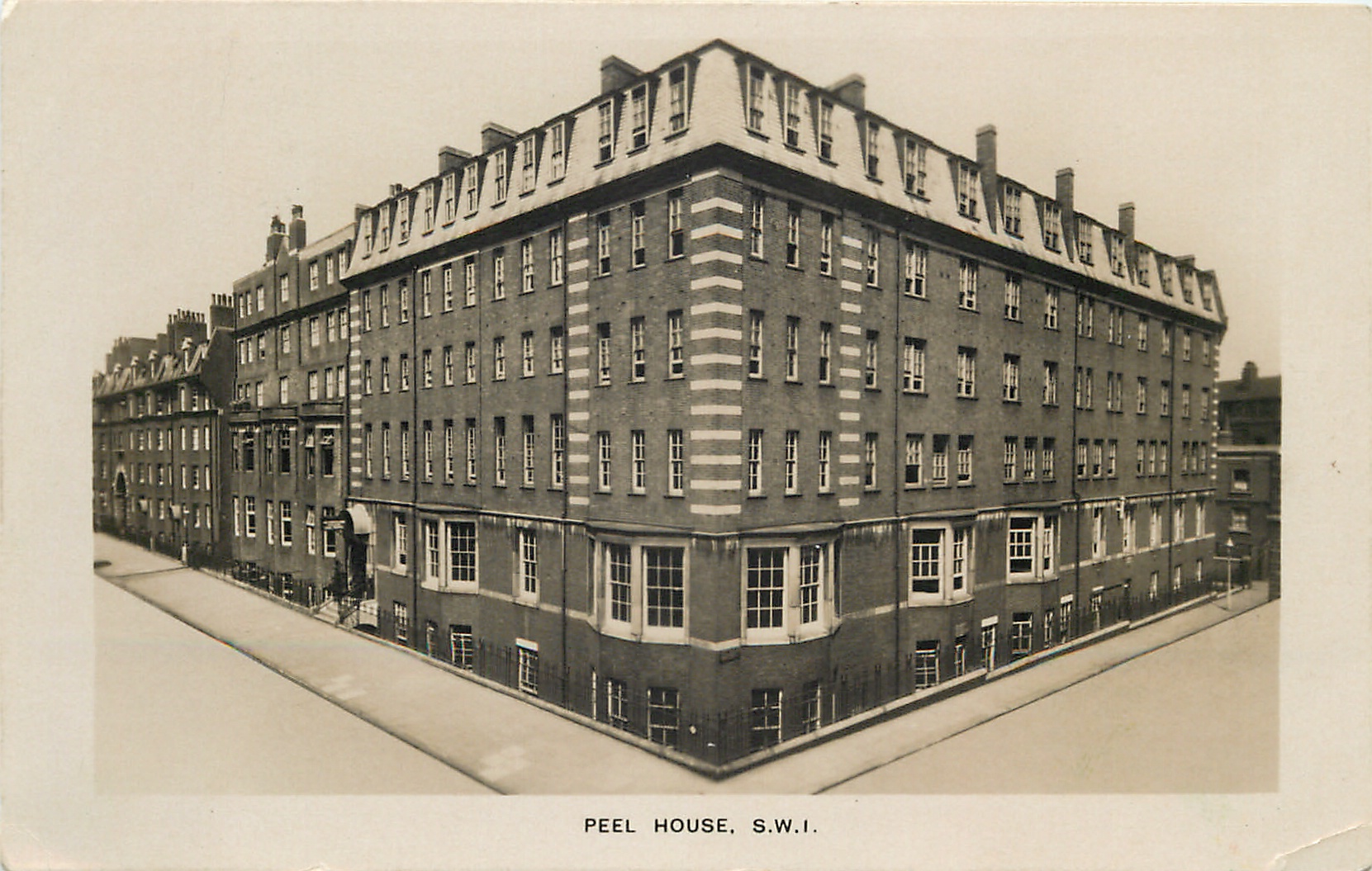
Peel House, Regency Street, Pimlico

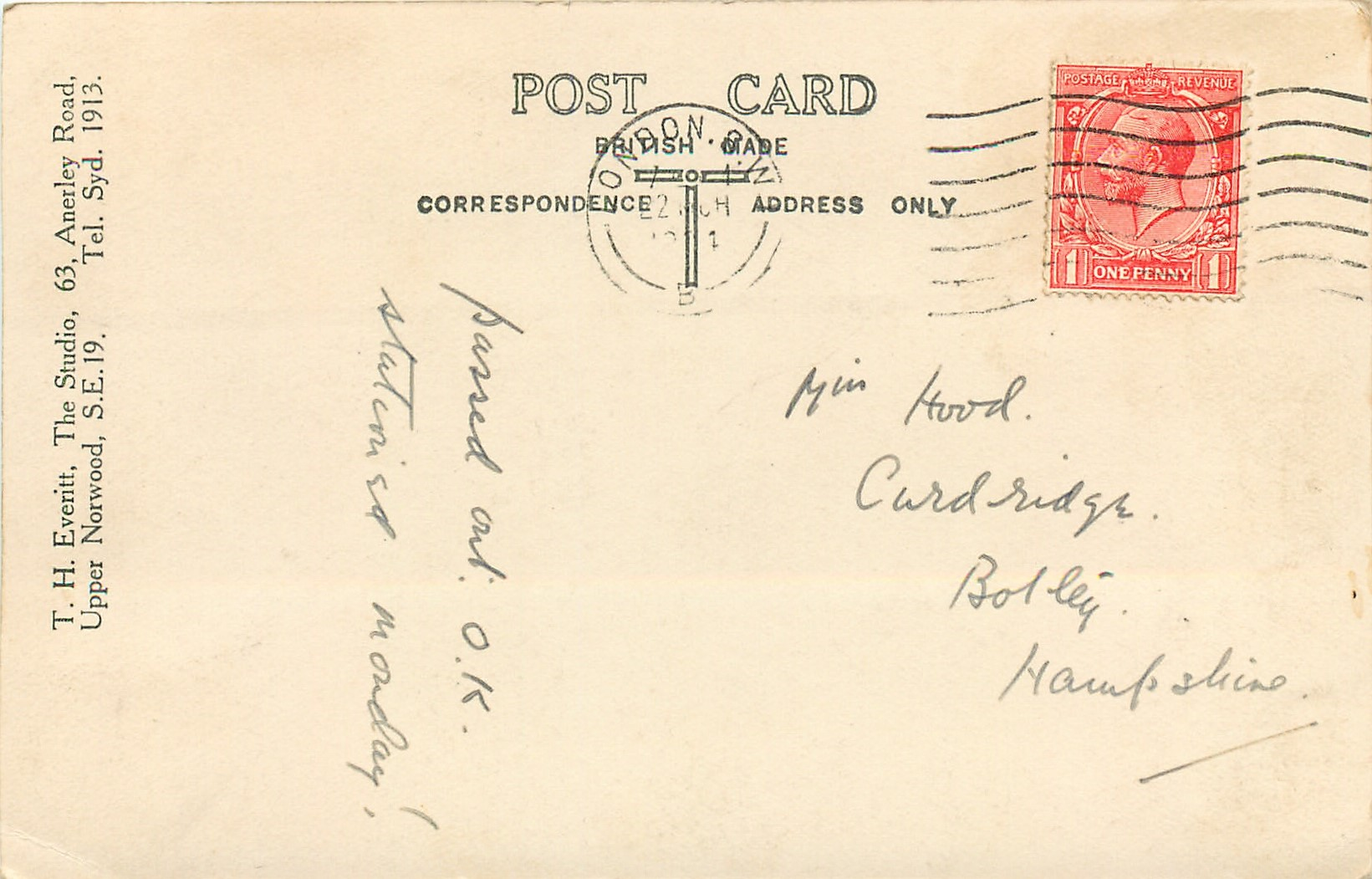
reverse of postcard posted in 1924, "passed out O.K. stationed Monday!"

Peel House is a former Metropolitan Police training school in Regency Street, Pimlico, London SW1. It was built in the year 1907, and is in a conservation area, but not a listed building, and Westminster City Council has identified it as being "a building of unlisted merit". It was the Metropolitan Police Training School until its closure in May 1968, with its candidates moved to Hendon ahead of the reopening of Hendon Police College in 1974.

In 2010, it was converted into 70 residential flats and is run by the Octavia Housing Association. Peel House was the "affordable housing" element of Christian Candy and Sheikh Hamad bin Jassim bin Jaber Al Thani's One Hyde Park residential and retail complex located in Knightsbridge, overlooking Hyde Park, even though it was two miles away. It was reported in the Daily Telegraph, that one Regency Street commented, "They [the Candy brothers] are creating a billionaires' ghetto in Knightsbridge and putting all the poorer residents here."
