= Douglas Mackillop =

British diplomat

Douglas MacKillop CMG (12 May 1891 – 25 February 1959) was a British diplomat.

== Biography ==
Douglas MacKillop was educated at Manchester Grammar School and Manchester University. He served in the army during World War I.

== Diplomatic career ==
After the war he joined the Diplomatic Service and served in Sofia, Helsinki, Athens, Brussels, Moscow, Hankow, Riga and Berne as well as in the Foreign Office. In 1937, when he was temporarily in charge of the Moscow embassy, he made "one of the most thoughtful attempts to explain" Stalin's Great Purge: he argued that in all advanced states there was a growing tension between the principles of individualism and community. While governments felt impelled to pay lip-service to the notion of popular sovereignty and individual freedom, they also recognised that promoting economic welfare and national power required them to make the life of the common man more planned, managed and regulated. Although the Soviet regime took this process to an extreme by using terror as an instrument for regulating the population's behaviour, MacKillop argued that the growth of state power to achieve economic goals was a phenomenon across Europe. The move towards totalitarian government in the Soviet Union reflected deep social and economic tensions that were influencing political development across the globe.

In 1942, while he was in Berne, MacKillop worked to facilitate the emigration of a large group of Hungarian Jewish children to Palestine. As head of the Refugee Department in the Foreign Office in January 1946, he wrote that the exodus of Polish Jewry arose 'partly for racial and economic reasons, understandable since the new Poland does not offer them thc same opportunities as the old, and there is a spontaneous general wish on the part of European Jewry to go to Palestine. ... Though it is magnified and artificially fostered by Zionist propaganda, it is a real aspiration.' Despite this Foreign Office understanding, however, the British government continued to resist Jewish migration to Palestine.

MacKillop's final posting was as Consul-General at Munich. He left the Diplomatic Service in 1952 and was for a time employed in NATO International Secretariat.
