= Ronald Howe =

English barrister and police officer

Sir Ronald Martin Howe CVO MC (5 September 1896 – 30 August 1977) was an English barrister and police officer in the London Metropolitan Police.

Howe was the son of a journalist. He was educated at Westminster School, where he was head boy, and Christ Church, Oxford. He was commissioned into the 3rd Battalion, Royal Sussex Regiment in 1915 and served until 1919. He was wounded in 1917, was promoted acting captain in December 1917, won the Military Cross (MC) in 1918 as a company commander with the 7th Battalion, and was promoted Temporary Captain in September 1918. He resigned his commission in April 1920.

In 1924, he was called to the bar by the Inner Temple and joined the staff of the Director of Public Prosecutions. In February 1932, he was appointed Chief Constable (CID) in the Metropolitan Police, so that there were briefly two CID Chief Constables (John Ashley being the other). He was, however, promoted to Deputy Assistant Commissioner (CID) on 1 November 1933 and served in the post until 1945, when he was appointed Assistant Commissioner "C" (Crime). In 1953, he was appointed Deputy Commissioner of Police of the Metropolis. He retired on 20 January 1957. From 1945 to 1957, he also served as British Representative on the International Criminal Police Commission. After his retirement, he became chairman of Group 4 Total Security. In 1976 he retired from that post too, becoming the company's president.

Howe was appointed Commander of the Royal Victorian Order (CVO) in 1950 and was knighted in 1955.

He wrote The Pursuit of Crime (1961) and The Story of Scotland Yard (1965).

== Footnotes ==
Police appointments
Preceded by Henry Archer	Deputy Assistant Commissioner (CID), Metropolitan Police; 1933–1945	Succeeded by Hugh Young
Preceded by Sir Norman Kendal	Assistant Commissioner "C", Metropolitan Police; 1945–1953	Succeeded by Joe Jackson
Preceded by Sir John Nott-Bower	Deputy Commissioner of Police of the Metropolis; 1953–1957	Succeeded by Joseph Simpson
