= Hendon Police College =

Police academy in London, England

Coordinates: 51.593°N 0.242°W

Hendon Police College is the principal training centre for London's Metropolitan Police. Founded with the official name of the Metropolitan Police College, the college has officially been known as the Peel Centre since 1974, although its original name is still used frequently. Within the police service it is known simply as "Hendon".

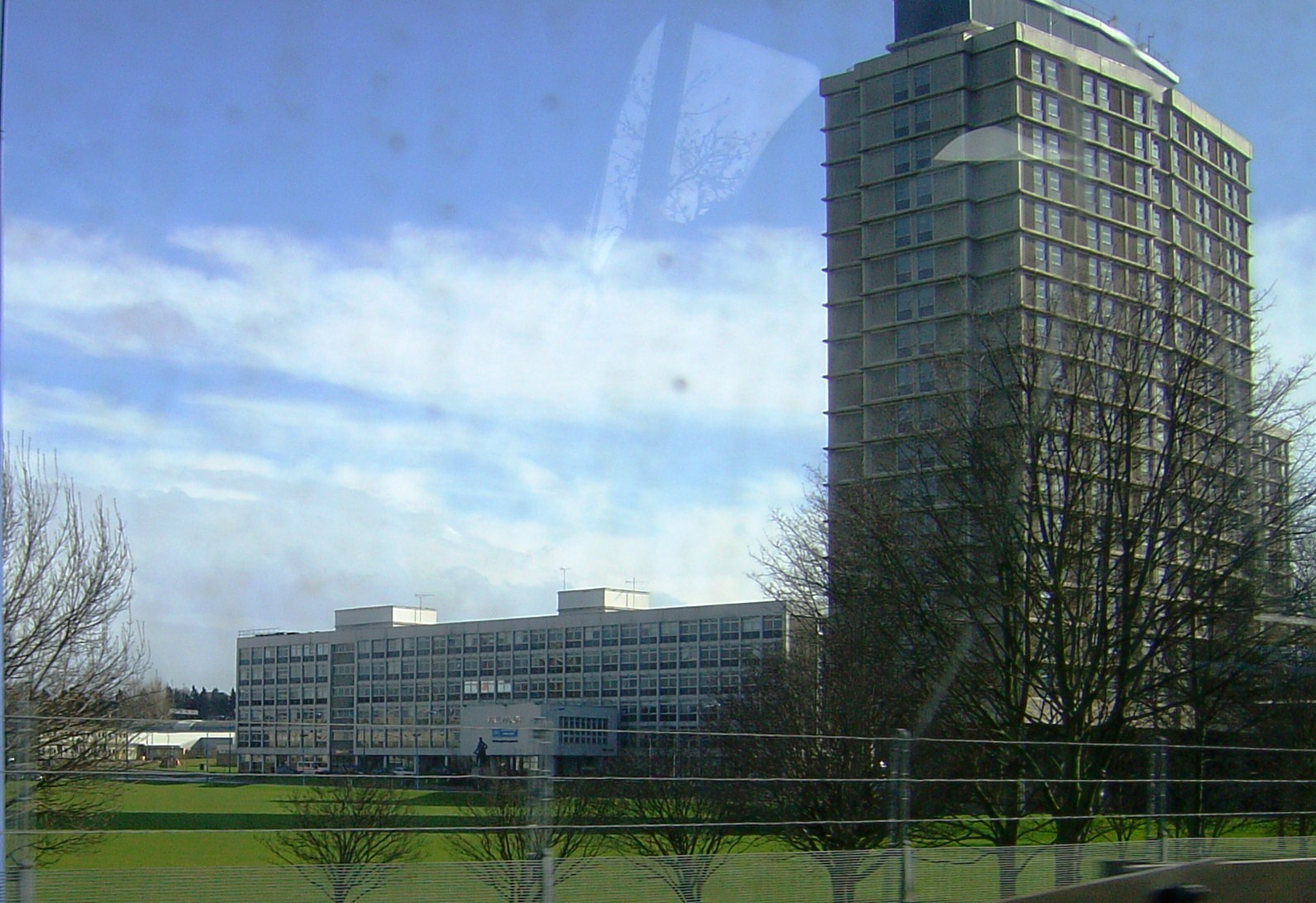
A view of some the former buildings, by John Innes Elliott, at Hendon Police College

The nearest London Underground station is Colindale on the Northern line.

== Police College (1934–1939) ==
The college was opened on 31 May 1934 by the Prince of Wales, in the erstwhile buildings of Hendon Country Club, Hendon Aerodrome's club house (which had been used briefly as laboratories of the Standard Telephones and Cables company). The school was the brainchild of Lord Trenchard, who was Commissioner of Police of the Metropolis from 1931 to 1935. His experiences as second-in-command of the Royal Flying Corps' Central Flying School in 1913 and 1914 gave him a suitable background for the venture, whilst the location would have been known to him from his time as Chief of the Air Staff (1921–1929).

The original concept for the college was a military-style cadet establishment to train officers to enter directly at senior rank, instead of the traditional entry at the lowest rank of constable for all personnel. Trenchard's idea was that in future almost all officers above the rank of inspector should be selected from college graduates, thus introducing a military-style officer corps. Candidates, of which there were to be about 30 every year, were selected by a competitive examination based on that for the Indian Police Service. Most of the candidates were already serving officers, although some were direct entrants from civilian life. Graduates were given the newly created rank of junior station inspector. Cadets who were already serving police officers received an annual salary of £200 (equivalent to £12,400 in 2025) and direct entrants received £170 (equivalent to £10,500 in 2025). New junior station inspectors were paid £300 (equivalent to £18,600 in 2025), rising to £320 (equivalent to £19,800 in 2025).

The first commandant was Lieutenant-Colonel Gordon Halland, previously Chief Constable of Lincolnshire, who was given the rank of deputy assistant commissioner. The assistant commandant was Lieutenant-Colonel Reggie Senior, seconded from the Indian Police Service with the rank of superintendent, and the chief instructor was Chief Inspector Carrick, an experienced instructor at the Metropolitan Police Training School, who was replaced by Chief Inspector Hugh Young after his promotion to superintendent and posting back to division in January 1935.

It was intended that the Metropolitan Police Training School for constables at Peel House in Westminster should also move to a site adjacent to the college, but in the end this did not happen until much later.

The first 32 cadets began their course on 10 May 1934. Twenty were serving officers (two sergeants and eighteen constables) and twelve were new recruits. The college was founded upon a modern and scientific approach to training. There were forensic laboratories, detective training facilities, a police driving school and a police wireless school, as well as representations of a police court and a police station.

The first course completed their training at the college in August 1935. The graduates then spent four months working as ordinary police constables at police stations in West Central London, four months at the various specialist departments at Scotland Yard, two months as section sergeants and two months as station sergeants. Although they were officially junior station inspectors throughout this period, they wore the uniforms of the rank in which they were serving at the time and not until this twelve-month period was up were they entitled to wear inspector's uniform. A junior station inspector was to wear one star over one bar on his epaulettes. The second intake of 29 cadets passed out in December 1935 and the third intake of 32 cadets in December 1936. In 1937, the course was extended from 15 months to two years, although only one intake ever completed this longer course. In August 1938, Major John Ferguson succeeded Halland as commandant. In November 1938 it was announced that the rank of junior station inspector was to be abolished, and in future all graduates were to be appointed to the rank of inspector. Promotion above this rank was also reopened to all officers, whether college graduates or not. The college was closed in September 1939. 197 men had trained there, of whom 188 had graduated.

=== Graduates ===
Graduates of the 1930s phase of the College included two future commissioners, Sir Joseph Simpson and Sir John Waldron (both 1934–1935), three deputy commissioners, Sir Ranulph Bacon (1934–1935), Douglas Webb (1935–1936) and Sir John Hill (who later also became HM Chief Inspector of Constabulary; 1938–1939), and two assistant commissioners, Tom Mahir and Andrew Way (both 1935–1936), as well as a number of Chief Constables of provincial forces, including Sir Edward Dodd (1934–1935) of Birmingham, Sir Eric St Johnston (1935–1936) of Oxfordshire, Durham, and Lancashire, and Sir John McKay (1937–1939) of Manchester, all three later HM Chief Inspectors of Constabulary, Bernard Bebbington (1935–1936) of Cambridge and John Gaskain (1936–1937) of Cumberland and Westmorland, both later HM Inspectors of Constabulary, Alec Muir (1934–1935) of Durham, Albert Wilcox (1934–1935) of Hertfordshire, Sir Douglas Osmond (1935–1936) of Shropshire and Hampshire, Sir Derrick Capper (1937–1939) of Birmingham and the West Midlands, John Gott (1937–1939) of Northamptonshire, Thomas Williams (1938–1939) of Huntingdonshire and the Isle of Ely, West Sussex, and Sussex, and David Holdsworth (1939) of Oxfordshire and Thames Valley. Other graduates included Deputy Assistant Commissioner John Bliss (1936–1937), first National Co-ordinator of Regional Crime Squads of England and Wales, Michael Macoun (1938–1939), Inspector-General of Police of Uganda and later of British Dependent Territories, and the politician Sir Henry Calley (1938–1939).

== Peel Centre (1974–present) ==
After World War II, there was debate about whether to reopen the college. Many considered the police did not need an "officer class" and were best-served by continuing to promote from the ranks. Eventually it was decided not to reopen it as an exclusive cadet college, but as the Metropolitan Police Training School for all entrants. The new National Police College, however, shared many of the principles behind Hendon, whilst in 1960 a Police Cadet College opened at Hendon for the new Metropolitan Police Cadet Corps or Force, formed in 1948 and consisting of full-time frontline employees who were aged 16–19.

When the Royal Air Force left Hendon in the 1960s, the Metropolitan Police decided to rebuild the 1934–1939 college, which was renamed after Sir Robert Peel. The new buildings were opened by Queen Elizabeth II on 31 May 1974, forty years to the day after her uncle opened the original Metropolitan Police College. The buildings were designed by the Metropolitan Police's surveyor and architect, John Innes Elliott. The Queen returned three times after that: in 1977 to open the new Hendon Gym, on 21 October 2001 she dedicated a memorial to Metropolitan Police officers and staff who lost their lives on duty, and on 3 January 2005 she visited the Casualty Bureau dealing with British nationals missing after the Asian tsunami.

The last 17-week course at Hendon finished on 6 July 2007. It was replaced with a 26-week course known as Initial Police Learning and Development Programme (IPLDP) scheme. In the summer of 2011, owing to budget restraints, IPLDP was replaced with a new, slimline, entrants course, bringing foundation training at the college in line with the national requirement as set by the Association of Chief of Police Officers, the NPIA and the Home Office.

The Peel Centre was redeveloped between 2014 and 2016, with Peel House, Simpson Hall and three tower blocks (previously used to house officers during initial training) demolished and sold to housing developer Redrow. The Metropolitan Police Book of Remembrance was moved from the old Simpson Hall in 2016 before its demolition and is now displayed at the entrance of the new Peel House. The memorial garden was also moved to its new home outside the new Peel House, with the original rose bushes and silver beech trees retained and replanted in the new location. The new Peel Centre sits on the site of the old Metropolitan Police swimming pool.

== Current use ==
The centre is run by the Director and Co-ordinator of Training, who is responsible for overseeing the training received by new recruits. Hendon is one of three regional training centres where new recruits attend to undertake a 17-week course (as paid trainees). In addition, all special constables begin their training at Hendon, completing the rest of their 23-day course (either as a weekdays intensive course or on 23 consecutive Saturdays or Sundays) at Hendon or another of the Metropolitan Police Service's 'Regional Training Centres'. The centre runs courses on many aspects of police work, from forensic and crime scene analysis, to radio operations and driving skills. Police officers can expect to return to the Centre at various times during their career.

== In popular culture ==
The college is frequently referenced in films and television series featuring the Metropolitan Police.

- Some of the action in the film The Lavender Hill Mob takes place at Hendon Police College.
- In the 1980s comedy-drama series A Very Peculiar Practice, Hendon Police College briefly merges with the fictional Lowlands University.
- An episode of the police procedural drama series The Bill called Final Drive was set and shot at the Hendon Driving School in 1996.
- The opening scenes of the 2007 film Hot Fuzz depict the main character attending the college in a montage.
- The college was used for the filming of the 2015 film Avengers: Age of Ultron.
