= Louisa Nott-Bower =

British archer

Louise Nott-Bower
Personal information
- Nationality: British
- Born: Louisa Yorke; 27 March 1861 Troedyraur, Ceredigion, Wales, United Kingdom of Great Britain and Ireland
- Died: 6 September 1925 (aged 64) Richmond, London, England, United Kingdom

Sport
- Sport: Archery
- Event: 1908 Summer Olympics

Louisa Adelaide Nott-Bower, born Louisa Yorke (27 March 1861 – 6 September 1925) was a British archer, born in Wales, who competed at the 1908 Summer Olympics in London, at age 47. She was also active on behalf of women's rights and moral welfare.

== Early life ==
Louisa Adelaide Yorke was born in Troedyraur, Ceredigion, the youngest of the twelve children of James Charles Yorke and Georgiana Augusta Hawkins. Her father died when she was a girl. Her mother was from Somerset.

== Olympics ==
Nott-Bower and her husband were amateur archers, affiliated with the Royal Richmond Archery Club. She competed at the 1908 Games in the only archery event open to women, the double National round competition. She was 47 years old that year and took eleventh place in the event with 503 points. The women's archery medalists that year were her British teammates Queenie Newall (gold), Lottie Dod (silver), and Beatrice Hill-Lowe (bronze).

== Women's rights ==
Nott-Bower was active in the women's suffrage movement and afterward. She attended the International Council of Women meeting in Switzerland in 1920 and headed the English branch of the International Woman's Council. Late in life, she attended an international women's meeting in Washington, D.C., and lectured on women's rights in the United States. She was also in the newspapers for her quotable observations about fashion and cookery, and about Americans as compared to the British.

In 1924, Lady Nott-Bower spoke at a conference on moral welfare organised by the National Council of Women. Her talk concerned "the problem of sexual offences against children, and suggested certain new lines of action in the case both of the offender and the victim".

== Personal life ==
Yorke married Sir Edmund Ernest Nott-Bower (1853–1933), a barrister, in 1886, and they had three children: George, Marianne, and Reginald. William Nott-Bower, Chief Constable of the City of London Police, was her brother-in-law; her nephew, Sir John Nott-Bower, was a later Chief Constable and ultimately Commissioner of the Metropolitan Police. Louisa Nott-Bower died in London in 1925, aged 64 years.
