= Thackwell =

Thackwell is a surname. Notable people with the surname include:

- Albertine Thackwell (1863-1944), British archer
- Joseph Thackwell (1781–1858), lieutenant general in the British Army
- Lisa Thackwell (born 1964/65), New Zealand racing driver
- Mike Thackwell (born 1961), New Zealand Formula 1 driver
