= Barry Martin (cricketer) =

English cricketer and educator

Personal information
- Full name: Barry Robert Martin
- Born: 20 July 1950 (age 76); Hampton, Middlesex, England
- Batting: Right-handed
- Bowling: Right-arm medium-fast

Domestic team information
- Years: Team
- 1971–1973: Cambridge University

Career statistics
Competition	First-class
Matches	6
Runs scored	36
Batting average	4.00
100s/50s	–/–
Top score	14
Balls bowled	720
Wickets	9
Bowling average	44.44
5 wickets in innings	–
10 wickets in match	–
Best bowling	2/42
Catches/stumpings	2/–
- Source: Cricinfo, 16 January 2022

Barry Robert Martin (born 18 July 1950) is an English former first-class cricketer and educator.

Martin was born at Hampton in July 1950. He was educated at Kingston Grammar School, before going up to St Catharine's College, Cambridge. While studying at Cambridge, he played first-class cricket intermittently for Cambridge University Cricket Club from 1971 to 1973, making six appearances. Playing as a medium-fast bowler in the Cambridge side, he took 9 wickets at an average of 44.44, with best figures of 2 for 42. As a tailend batsman, he scored 36 runs with a highest score of 14. In addition to playing cricket for Cambridge, Martin also played field hockey, for which he gained a blue.

After graduating from Cambridge, he studied for his Postgraduate Certificate in Education at the University of London, before proceeding to Loughborough University where he gained an MBA. From there he began a career in teaching.
