= Kent TV =

Internet-based broadband television channel

KentTV.com Official Logo

KentTV.com was an internet-based broadband television channel providing content to the county of Kent in the United Kingdom. It was launched in September 2007 by Kent County Council and was run Independently by Bob Geldof's media company Ten Alps. Content was produced in one of four ways, in house, user generated, commissioned and acquired. A decision was made in February 2010 to bring an end to what was agreed to be a shocking waste of public money at the end of the pilot period, in March 2010.

== About KentTV ==
Kent TV was designed to be an internet TV channel for everyone living and working in Kent. Video programmes about local issues, the arts, business, education, health, leisure, local government, tourism and travel were available. Kent TV was launched by Kent County Council and was operated by the independent media company, Ten Alps Digital. Ten Alps Digital is part of Ten Alps – a factual media company that provides and manages content on TV, radio, internet TV, and print.

== Board of Governors ==
The Kent TV Board of Governors were responsible for:

- Creating and developing the Editorial Specification for Kent TV
- Monitoring the Channel's performance
- Ensuring that the Channel delivered good value to the people of Kent
- Ensuring that the Channel was fair and impartial
- Arbitrating on complaints from visitors, in the last resort, if the complainant is not satisfied with the response from the Kent TV production team.

As of January 2009, The Board of Governors consists of the following members:

- Cheryl Armitage, Media Consultant, Armitage Bucks Communications
- Ian Chittenden, County Councillor for Maidstone North East
- Nigel Dacre, Ten Alps Project Director
- Peter Gilroy, Chief Executive Kent County Council
- Charlie Hendry, Chief fire officer and Chief Executive for Kent Fire and Rescue Service
- Martin Jackson, Media Consultant
- Richard King, County Councillor Ashford Rural West
- Adrian Leppard, Assistant Chief Constable
- John McGhie, Kent TV Editor
- Geoff Miles, managing director of The Maidstone Studios
- Tanya Oliver, Head of Strategic Development Unit / Interim Corporate Communications Manager
- Ray Parker, County Councillor Northfleet & Gravesend West
- Steve Phoenix, Chief Executive of West Kent PCT
- Ann Sutton, Chief Executive of Eastern and Coastal Kent PCT
- Paul Wookey, Chief Executive, Locate in Kent

== Criticism ==
Criticism from local media companies, politicians and residents surrounding the funding of KentTV prompted Ten Alps figurehead Bob Geldof to address the issues in a short interview with the internet station which was also shown as part of a 2008 BBC News segment. Bob Geldof stated that KentTV was a "vital public service, which is all we ever wanted to be" and that "Its old media versus new media – it’s the old establishment versus new kids on the block ...and it's obviously commercially driven. I think the local papers fear that they are going to lose revenues. But empirically, that's just not so".

During the 2008 BBC Segment local politician Trudy Dean suggested that the channel was biased towards the Conservatives, and rarely interviewed other political parties, the channel's editor John McGhie responded by stating that in the same way that Labour cabinet members in the national government were on the BBC more because they were in office, so too were the Conservatives locally in Kent and that on all party political matters, all three parties within KCC (Kent County Council) were given equal say.

== Closure ==
In February 2010 the decision was made to close Kent TV. In a statement, Kent County Council leader Cllr Paul Carter said: "Kent TV has proved itself to be a brave and bold innovation and we have learned a great deal from it. It has provided a source of practical, useful information for residents."

But he added: "We are living in different and difficult economic times compared with when the pilot was launched in September 2007. In difficult times our spending has to be prioritised. We have therefore decided that Kent TV will not continue when the pilot period ends in March 2010."
