= Sarah Leonard =

Sarah Leonard may refer to:

- Sarah Leonard (archer) (1862–1951), British archer
- Sarah Leonard (singer) (1953–2024), English classical soprano
