= Robert Boakes =

British–Australian psychologist and academic (born 1939)

Robert Alan Boakes
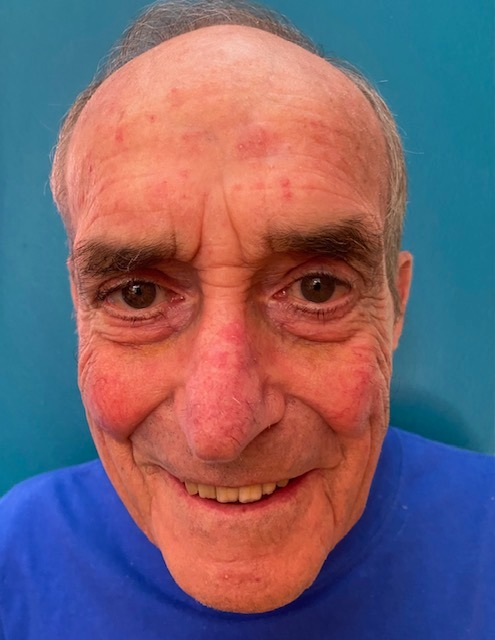
- Born: August 21, 1939 (age 87); Streatham, London, England
- Education: University of Cambridge (BA); Harvard University (PhD)
- Known for: Associative learning; flavour–nutrient conditioning; psychobiology of eating
- Notable work: From Darwin to Behaviourism (1984); Pavlov's Legacy (2023)
- Awards: Frank Knox Memorial Fellowship
- Scientific career
- Fields: Psychology
- Workplaces: University of Sussex; University of Sydney

Robert Alan Boakes (born 21 August 1939) is a British–Australian psychologist and academic notable for research in experimental psychology, especially learning, behaviour, and associative models in animals and humans. He is Emeritus Professor of Psychology at the University of Sydney, having held the McCaughey Chair in Psychology.

== Early life and education ==
Boakes was born in Streatham, London, on 21 August 1939. He studied in Surrey, attending Lime Grove Primary School, Elm Grove Church of England Junior School, and Kingston Grammar School. After a year as an engineering apprentice at Metropolitan Vickers in Salford, he pursued tertiary studies at the University of Cambridge, completing Natural Sciences (Psychology) and earning a BA with honours in 1963. He received a Frank Knox Memorial Fellowship and completed his PhD in Psychology at Harvard University in 1967.

== Academic appointments ==
- 1966–1967: Assistant Lecturer, University of Sussex, Brighton, UK
- 1967–1986: Lecturer, University of Sussex
- 1986–1989: Reader in Experimental Psychology, University of Sussex
- 1989–1992: Professor of Psychology, University of Sydney
- 1992–2005: McCaughey Professor of Psychology, University of Sydney
- 2006: Awarded the title of Emeritus Professor by the Senate, University of Sydney
- 2006–2024: Annual lectures in the 'Learning and Behaviour' unit and supervision of honours and PhD students, University of Sydney (unpaid)

== Research ==
Boakes founded the Australian Learning Group after relocating to Sydney. His work has focused on:

- Associative learning – stimulus–reinforcer associations and Pavlovian–operant interaction
- Odor–taste synesthesia – learned sweetness in odors after conditioning
- Olfactory conditioning – associative acquisition of taste properties by odors
- Associative learning and calories – impact of sweetness and energy content
- Instrumental learning – extended training and resistance to extinction
- Sugar and obesity – metabolic and behavioural effects of sugar consumption in rats and humans

== Research grants ==
Boakes served as chief investigator on the following Australian Research Council (ARC) grants:

- (2000–2002) An associative model of human olfaction (with R. J. Stevenson and M. J. Kiernan)
- (2001–2003) Persistence of hedonic conditioning in rats
- (2010–2014) The missing calories effect in rats and humans
- (2014–2016) Flavour learning and food consumption in rats and humans: Implications for obesity (with K. Rooney)
- (2017–2019) Withdrawal from and relapse to sugar drinks: Metabolic and behavioural effects (with K. Rooney)

== Selected publications ==
=== Books ===
- Boakes, R. A. & Halliday, M. S. (Eds.) (1972). Inhibition and Learning. London: Academic Press.
- Dickinson, A. & Boakes, R. A. (Eds.) (1979). Mechanisms of Learning and Motivation. Hillsdale, NJ: Lawrence Erlbaum Associates.
- Boakes, R. A., Popplewell, D. A. & Burton, M. J. (Eds.) (1987). Eating Habits. Chichester: John Wiley.
- Boakes, R. A. (1984). From Darwin to Behaviourism: Psychology and the Minds of Animals. Cambridge: Cambridge University Press. ISBN ISBN 978-0-521-28012-9
- Boakes, R. A. (2023). Pavlov's Legacy: How and What Animals Learn. Cambridge: Cambridge University Press.

=== Journal articles ===
- Stevenson, R. J., Boakes, R. A. & Prescott, J. (1998). Changes in odour sweetness resulting from implicit learning of a simultaneous odour-sweetness association: An example of learned synesthesia. Learning and Motivation, 29(2), 113–132.
- Stevenson, R. J. & Boakes, R. A. (2003). A mnemonic theory of odor perception. Psychological Review, 110(2), 340–364.
- Dickinson, A., Balleine, B., Watt, A., Gonzalez, F. & Boakes, R. A. (1995). Motivational control after extended instrumental training. Animal Learning and Behavior, 23, 197–206.
- Kendig, M. D., Boakes, R. A., Rooney, K. B. & Corbit, L. H. (2013). Chronic restricted access to 10% sucrose solution in adolescent and young adult rats impairs spatial memory and alters sensitivity to outcome devaluation. Physiology & Behavior, 120, 164–172.
- Boakes, R. A. & Colagiuri, B. (2013). Juice and calories: The impact of sweetness and energy content on flavour-nutrient learning. Learning and Motivation, 44(2), 75–87.
- Boakes, R. A. & Costa, D. S. J. (2014). Temporal contiguity in associative learning: Interference and decay from an historical perspective. Journal of Experimental Psychology: Animal Learning and Cognition, 40, 381–400.

== Personal life ==
Boakes was married to Mary Frances White (1967–1989) and to Margaret June Kirkwood (1997–present). He has three children, eight grandchildren, and two great-grandchildren.

== Sources ==
- "Robert A. Boakes – Research Profile". Research.com.
- "Professor Emeritus Robert Boakes". University of Sydney.
