= John Spiers (entrepreneur) =

British businessman and philanthropist

- Born: 16 September 1950 (age 76); Bristol, England
- Education: Clare College, Cambridge
- Occupation: Businessman
- Known for: Founder of Bestinvest
- Website: https://eqinvestors.co.uk/

John Spiers MBE is an entrepreneur and philanthropist. He founded Bestinvest in 1986 and sold it to 3i Group in 2007. He is now Chair of EQ Investors Group, a wealth management company in London and runs The EQ Foundation, a registered charity.

== Early life and education ==
Spiers was born in Bristol in 1950. He attended Kingston Grammar School and graduated with an MA in engineering in 1972 from Clare College, Cambridge, where he is now an Elizabeth de Clare Fellow. His first employment was as a Student Apprentice at the Atomic Weapons Research Establishment in Aldermaston. From 1975 to 1986 he worked as a stockbroker in the City of London, latterly with W. Greenwell & Co..

== Career ==
In 1986 Spiers founded Bestinvest as an independent analyst of tax efficient investments, notably those structured under the new Business Expansion Scheme (BES). After 1993 when the BES was abolished Bestinvest diversified to become a wealth manager. which he sold to 3i in 2007 for in excess of £165m. At the time of the sale, Bestinvest was one of the fastest growing wealth management companies in the UK with funds of £3.5bn under management and over 50,000 clients.. During the 2008 financial crisis Spiers was asked to return as CEO of Bestinvest temporarily and then became a non-executive director until the business was sold to Permira in 2014.

In 2014 he bought the financial planning arm of Truestone and renamed the business as EQ Investors. EQ stands for emotional quotient, reflecting the ambition to operate in a way that is positive for society as well as for shareholders. As CEO of EQ Investors he expanded the range of its activities and increased staff numbers to over 70. EQ emphasises ethics and was one of the first UK companies to become a B Corporation. Spiers continues to act as non-executive chair of EQ Investors Group.

== Philanthropy ==
In 2008 he set up the Spiers Family Foundation which supported charities with an emphasis on Early Years Intervention (e.g. WAVE Trust), poverty (e.g. Centre for Social Justice) and education (e.g. Sutton Trust, African Prisons Project).

The EQ Foundation was established as a registered charity with an emphasis on supporting small charities. Spiers now leads the Giving is Great initiative to improve the availability of data for charity donors and recipients and has also launched GiveMore - donating platform to help donors support effective charities that have been professionally vetted.

== Awards ==
Spiers was awarded an MBE for services to Business and the Charitable Sector in the 2026 New Years Honours List.

In 2021 he received a Lifetime Achievement award from the City of London Wealth Managers Association.

== Sports ==
Spiers has played competitive golf croquet and represented England at the 2008 World Golf Croquet Championship in Cape Town. He took part in the London–Mexico Rally in 1995 and the London–Sydney Marathon in 2000, and he had competed in historic motor racing.

== Media coverage ==
His views are frequently sought by the financial press.

In 2018 Spiers' return to wealth management at EQ was covered by the London Evening Standard in an article.
