= Archery at the 1908 Summer Olympics – Women's double National round =

Archery at the Olympics

Women's double National round at the Games of the IV Olympiad
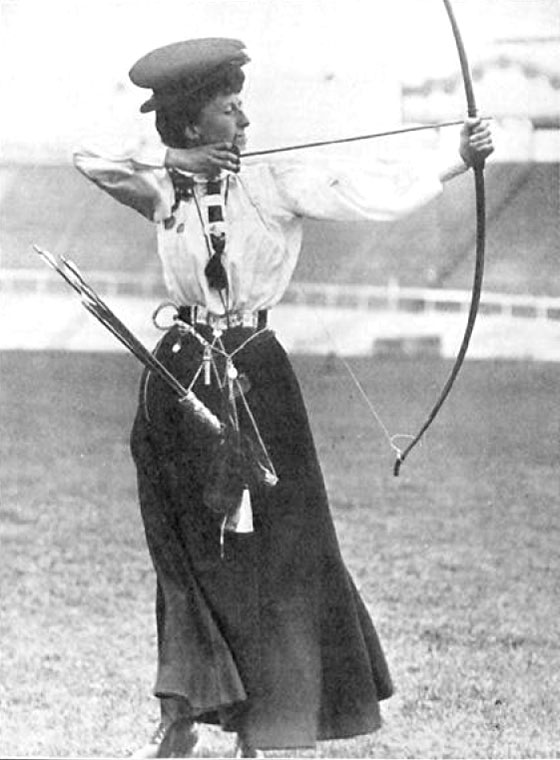
- Gold medalist Queenie Newall in competition during the women's double National round.
- Venue: White City Stadium
- Dates: 17–18 July
- Competitors: 25 from 1 nation

Medalists
1st place, gold medalist(s)		Queenie Newall	Great Britain
2nd place, silver medalist(s)		Lottie Dod	Great Britain
3rd place, bronze medalist(s)		Beatrice Hill-Lowe	Great Britain

1908 Highlight Film Women's Archery @ 1:43

The women's double National round was one of three archery events on the archery at the 1908 Summer Olympics programme. The competition was held on Friday, 17 July and Saturday, 18 July, with one round each day. The archers had to contend with significant rain and wind on the first day and gusts of wind on the second.

Great Britain was the only nation to enter female archers, ensuring that they swept this event. Queenie Newall, at 53 years of age, set a record for oldest female Olympic gold medalist. Lottie Dod took second place, not quite matching her brother William Dod's gold medal finish in the men's York round. Beatrice Hill-Lowe took bronze.

NOCs were limited to 30 competitors each. Twenty-five archers only from Great Britain competed.

== Background ==
This was the second and final appearance of the event; it was previously held in 1904.

Alice Legh won 23 national championships from 1886 to 1922 and "almost certainly would have won" this event had she competed; she chose not to. Among the archers who did compete, Lottie Dod was the most accomplished sportswoman, though she was best known for playing tennis. Dod had retired from tennis in 1893 and had successful careers in field hockey and golf before turning to archery in the Olympics.

== Competition format ==
The archers shot a total of 144 arrows each over the two rounds of 72. Each round consisted of 48 arrows at 60 yards (54.8 m) and 24 arrows at 50 yards (45.7 m). Three arrows were shot per end. Each hit was worth 9, 7, 5, 3, or 1 points depending on which ring was hit; an arrow touching two rings would count as hitting the higher value. Ties were broken first by number of hits, then by score at the longest range (60 yards), then by hits at the longest range.

== Schedule ==
The double National round event was held on the first two days of the archery schedule, along with the men's double Yorkround.

Legend

F	Final

Event	17 July	18 July	19 July	20 July
Men's double York round	F			
Men's Continental style				F
Women's double National round	F			

== Results ==
After the first day, the top two archers had separated from the rest. Dod and Newall had each hit 66 targets out of 72; Dod had a slight lead of 348 to 338. Newall was the best archer on day two, having the best round of the tournament with 350. Dod's second day was much worse, however, as she scored only 294 (the sixth-best score of the day). This gave Newall the gold medal, while Dod was able to hang on to second place. Hill-Lowe scored 343 on the second day, a vast improvement over her 275 first-day score and second-best behind Newall, to earn the bronze medal.

Rank	Archer	Nation	Score	Hits
1st place, gold medalist(s)	Queenie Newall	Great Britain	688	132
2nd place, silver medalist(s)	Lottie Dod	Great Britain	642	126
3rd place, bronze medalist(s)	Beatrice Hill-Lowe	Great Britain	618	118
4	Jessie Wadworth	Great Britain	605	122
5	Dora Honnywill	Great Britain	587	123
6	Ethel Armitage	Great Britain	582	112
7	Lizzie Foster	Great Britain	553	117
8	Lillian Wilson	Great Britain	534	112
9	Brenda Wadworth	Great Britain	522	123
10	Adelaide Boddam-Whetham	Great Britain	510	114
11	Louisa Nott-Bower	Great Britain	503	109
12	Gertrude Appleyard	Great Britain	503	107
13	Lillias Robertson	Great Britain	500	112
14	Margaret Weedon	Great Britain	498	104
15	Albertine Thackwell	Great Britain	484	104
16	Doris E. Day	Great Britain	483	109
17	Katherine Mudge	Great Britain	465	111
18	Ellen Babington	Great Britain	451	103
19	Dorothy Cadman-Cadman	Great Britain	427	107
20	Martina Hyde	Great Britain	419	103
21	Sarah Leonard	Great Britain	410	92
22	Ina Wood	Great Britain	387	93
23	Janetta Vance	Great Britain	385	95
24	Emily Rushton	Great Britain	323	89
25	Hilda Williams	Great Britain	316	82

== Aftermath ==
Newall would be defeated by Legh by 151 points the next week at the British national championships, though Newall would go on to win in 1911 and 1912.

Women's archery would not be held again until 1972. (Archery was not held in 1912, only men's events were held in 1920, and the sport was absent from the programme from 1924 to 1968.)

== Sources ==
- Official Report of the Games of the IV Olympiad (1908).
- De Wael, Herman. Herman's Full Olympians: "Archery 1908". Accessed 8 April 2006. Available electronically at.
