= Edmund Nott-Bower =

Sir Edmund Ernest Nott-Bower, KCB (born Bower; 18 August 1853 – 14 September 1933) was a British civil servant.

Born on 18 August 1853, he was the son of Dr John Bower; Ernest's brother was Sir William Nott-Bower, who served as Commissioner of the City of London Police. Ernest was surnamed Bower until 1913, when he adopted the surname Nott-Bower, as his brother had done by royal licence in 1911.

In 1886, Bower was called to the bar, and in 1895 he became assistant secretary to the Board of Inland Revenue. He was a Commissioner of Inland Revenue from 1902 to 1908, then was Deputy Chairman of the Board of Inland Revenue from 1908 to 1914, when he became its Chairman, serving until 1918. He was appointed a Companion of the Order of the Bath (CB) in the 1909 Birthday Honours and promoted to Knight Commander (KCB) in the 1915 New Year Honours.

Nott-Bower died on 14 September 1933. His wife Louisa, née Yorke, had died in 1925; they left a son and daughter.

Government offices
Preceded by Sir Matthew Nathan	Chairman, Board of Inland Revenue; 1914–1918	Succeeded by Sir Warren Fisher
