= Ellen Babington =

British archer (1877–1956)

Ellen Mabel Liederskron Babington (12 June 1877 – 10 September 1956) was a British archer. She competed at the 1908 Summer Olympics in London. Babington competed at the 1908 Games in the only archery event open to women, the double National round. She took 18th place in the event with 451 points.
