= Alexander McLean (activist) =

Founder of African Prisons Project

- Born: 1985 (age 40–41)
- Education: University of Nottingham, University of London
- Known for: Founder of Justice Defenders

Alexander McLean (born 1985) is a British activist, humanitarian, and lawyer. He is the founder of Justice Defenders (formerly African Prisons Project, or APP), which is based in Uganda and seeks to improve the lives of people imprisoned in Africa.

== Life and work ==
McLean was born in 1985 and grew up in the "southern outskirts of London." His father is Jamaican and worked as a retired tool maker while his mother was from Surrey and worked for United Airways. He has an older brother and sister.

McLean attended Kingston Grammar School, having been awarded a scholarship. At a young age, he became fascinated with social issues and the criminal justice system. In his teens, he worked for a quadriplegic who suffered from multiple sclerosis and volunteered at a hospice.

After high school, McLean visited Uganda to volunteer as a hospice worker at the Mulago hospital in Kampala. There, he was motivated to start Justice Defenders in 2007 after observing that prison inmates were not given proper medical care and seeing the conditions at Luzira Upper Prison. After coming back to the United Kingdom, McLean fund-raised to provide good health facilities and educate inmates in Ugandan prisons about the law, beginning the organization.

McLean attended the University of Nottingham, graduating in 2007. He was the first in his family to earn a university degree. After graduation, he moved to Kampala, where he created a team of local and international staff and volunteers with the goal of professionalizing the African Prisons Project and increasing its impact.

McLean studied at the University of London by correspondence, receiving a Master of Laws in 2009 and being called to the bar of England and Wales in 2010.

=== Honors and awards ===
- UK Charity Volunteer of the Year 2006
- UK Young Philanthropist of the Year 2007
- Overall Winner, Beacon Prize for Philanthropy 2007
- University of Nottingham Alumni of the Year 2007
- UK Graduate of the Year 2007
- Winner, Vodafone World of Difference Prize 2008
- Fellow of the Royal Society of Arts (2008)
- Ashoka Fellow
- Time Top 30 Under 30
- Grinnell College Innovator for Social Justice Prize 2020
- Qatar Foundation WISE Award 2020
