= Lillias Robertson =

British archer (1882–1976)

Personal information
- Full name: Lillias Anne Marshall Robertson
- Nationality: British
- Born: 20 July 1882
- Died: 13 March 1976 (aged 93)

Sport
- Sport: Archery

Lillias Robertson (20 July 1882 – 13 March 1976) was a British archer. She competed at the 1908 Summer Olympics in London. Robertson competed at the 1908 Games in the only archery event open to women, the double National round. She took 13th place in the event with 500 points.
