= Brenda Wadworth =

British archer (1885–1962)

Brenda Wadworth (26 November 1885 – 28 January 1962) was a British archer who competed at the 1908 Summer Olympics in London. She was the daughter of Jessie Wadworth. Wadworth competed at the 1908 Games in the only archery event open to women, the double National round competition. She took ninth place in the event with 522 points.
