= Lillian Wilson =

British archer (1864–1909)

Lillian Sarah Wilson (12 November 1864 – 1 March 1909) was a British archer who competed at the 1908 Summer Olympics in London. Wilson competed at the 1908 Games in the only archery event open to women, the double National round competition. She took eighth place in the event with 534 points.
