= Warren Fisher (civil servant) =

British civil servant (1879–1948)

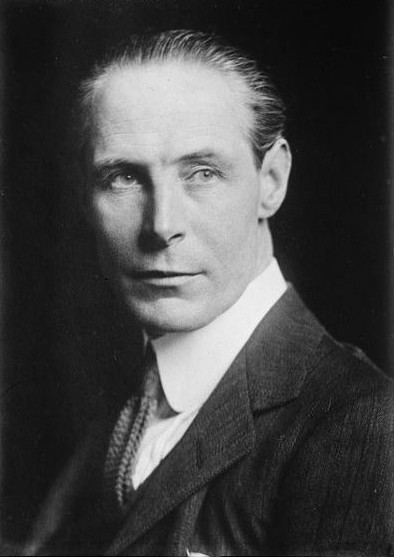
Warren Fisher

Sir Norman Fenwick Warren Fisher GCB GCVO (22 September 1879 – 25 September 1948) was a British civil servant.

Fisher was born in Croydon, London, the only son of Henry Warren Fisher. He was educated at the Dragon School (Oxford), Winchester College and Hertford College, Oxford. He matriculated in 1898, taking a first Classical Moderations in 1900 and a graduating with a second in Greats in 1902.

After failing to get into the Indian Civil Service and the medical examination for the Royal Navy, he came 16th in the civil service exams in 1903. Sixteen years later he was Permanent Secretary to the Treasury and the first-ever Head of the Home Civil Service. Fisher has been described as one of the most influential British civil servants of his generation.

Fisher gave the Civil Service a cohesion it previously lacked and did more to reform it than any man in the preceding fifty years. He increased the importance of the Treasury. He advanced the interests of women in the civil service and at one point described himself as a feminist. However, he was also a controversial figure: his colleague Maurice Hankey, with whom he sometimes co-operated and sometimes competed on issues of imperial defence policy, once described him as 'rather mad', and he was criticised for his attempts to control the appointments of senior civil servants across Whitehall. Christopher Bullock was one example. His generally unsuccessful attempts to gain a say in Foreign Office appointments were much resented, and gave rise to unfounded accusations that he had been an appeaser (despite a robust defence of his reputation by the anti-appeaser Robert Vansittart).

He married Mary Ann Lucie (Maysie) Thomas on 24 April 1906 and had two sons, but the marriage ended in separation in 1921. He died in London a few days after his 69th birthday.

Sir Noel Curtis-Bennett eulogised him in a letter to The Times, for his patriotism and as a great public servant.

His elder son Norman Fisher (d. 1982) made his career in the Royal Navy, surviving two submarine disasters before the war and attaining the rank of captain; his second son Robin died in 1988.

== Offices held ==
Government offices
Preceded by Sir Edmund Nott-Bower	Chairman, Board of Inland Revenue; 1918–1919	Succeeded by Sir John Anderson
Preceded by New position	Head of the Home Civil Service; 1919–1939	Succeeded by Sir Horace Wilson
Preceded by Sir John Bradbury; Sir Robert Chalmers	Permanent Secretary to the Treasury; 1919–1939	Succeeded by Sir Horace Wilson

== Bibliography ==
- Fisher, Sir (Norman Fenwick) Warren at Oxford Dictionary of National Biography (requires login)
- Hennessy, Peter, Never Again (London: Penguin Books 1992)
- O'Halpin, Eunan, Head of the Civil Service: A Study of Sir Warren Fisher, (London: Routledge 1989)
- 'Sir Warren Fisher, Head of the Civil Service 1919 – 1939', PhD thesis by Eunan O'Halpin
