= Doris E. Day =

British archer (1872–1966)

Doris Elinor Day (née Philips; 3 August 1872 – 30 August 1966) was a British archer. She competed at the 1908 Summer Olympics in London. She was born in Abbeycwmhir, Powys, Great Britain and died in East London, South Africa. Day competed at the 1908 Games in the only archery event open to women, the double National round. She took 16th place in the event with 483 points.

Day was Welsh, and her husband was a priest of the Church of England named Ernest Hermitage Day (1866 – 1946).

== Bibliography ==
- Cook, Theodore Andrea (1908). The Fourth Olympiad, Being the Official Report. London: British Olympic Association.
- De Wael, Herman (2001). "Archery 1908". Herman's Full Olympians. Archived from the original on 29 September 2006.
- Doris E. Day's profile at Sports Reference.com
