= Dorothy Cadman-Cadman =

British archer (1889–1971)

Personal information
- Birth name: Dorothy Sharpe
- Born: 5 February 1889; Lancaster, Lancashire
- Died: 23 December 1971 (aged 82); York

Sport
- Country: Great Britain
- Sport: Archery
- Club: Lonsdale Archers

Achievements and titles
- Olympic finals: 1908 Summer Olympics – Women's double National round

Dorothy Cadman-Cadman, Lady Wingate-Saul (née Sharpe; 5 February 1889 – 23 December 1971) was a British archer from Lancaster. She competed at the 1908 Summer Olympics in London.

Cadman competed at the 1908 Games in the only archery event open to women, the double National round. She took 19th place in the event with 427 points.

She married firstly in 1903, Christopher Cadman-Cadman (1873–1931) and secondly in 1938, Sir Ernest Wingate-Saul (1873–1944). She died in York, Yorkshire, aged 83.
