= Ethel Armitage =

British archer (1873–1957)

Ethel Isabel Armitage (21 June 1873 – 17 October 1957) was a British archer. She competed at the 1908 Summer Olympics in London. She was born in Salford, Greater Manchester. Armitage competed at the 1908 Games in the only archery event open to women, the double National round. She took 6th place in the event with 582 points.
