= Adelaide Boddam-Whetham =

British archer (1860–1954)

Adelaide Harriet Boddam-Whetham (9 December 1860 – 20 September 1954) was a British archer. She competed at the 1908 Summer Olympics in London. Boddam-Whetham competed at the 1908 Games in the only archery event open to women, the double National round. She took 10th place in the event with 510 points.
