= Perry Nove =

British police officer

Perry Richard Nove is a retired British senior police officer who served as commissioner of the City of London Police from 1998 to 2002.

== Police career ==
Nove was awarded the Queen's Police Medal (QPM) in the 1997 Queen's Birthday Honours in recognition of his service as assistant commissioner for the City of London Police. He was appointed Officer (Brother) of the Order of St John (OStJ) in 1999, and Commander of the Order of the British Empire (CBE) in the 2003 New Year Honours for services to the police.

== Honours ==

Ribbon	Description	Notes
	Order of the British Empire (CBE)	2003
	Order of St John (OStJ)	1999
	Queen's Police Medal	1997
	Police Long Service and Good Conduct Medal	

Police appointments
Preceded by William Taylor	Commissioner of the City of London Police; 1998–2002	Succeeded by James Hart
