= Lizzie Foster =

British archer (1856–1948)

Personal information
- National team: Great Britain
- Born: 10 September 1856; Colac, Victoria
- Died: 9 February 1948 (aged 91); West Monkton, England
- Occupation: Archer

Lizzie Foster (10 September 1856 – 9 February 1948) was a British archer. She competed at the 1908 Summer Olympics in London. Foster competed at the 1908 Games in the only archery event open to women, the double National round. She took 7th place in the event with 553 points.

Foster competed with the Vale of White Horse Archers.

== Sources ==
- Cook, Theodore Andrea (1908). The Fourth Olympiad, Being the Official Report. London: British Olympic Association.
- De Wael, Herman (2001). "Archery 1908". Herman's Full Olympians.
