= Martina Hyde =

British archer (1866–1937)

Martina Hyde (25 December 1866 – 17 May 1937) was a British archer. She competed at the 1908 Summer Olympics in London. Hyde competed at the 1908 Games in the only archery event open to women, the double National round. She took 20th place in the event with 419 points.
