= Emily Rushton =

British archer

Emily Jane Rushton (c. 1850 – 30 June 1939) was a British archer. She competed at the 1908 Summer Olympics in London. Rushton competed at the 1908 Games in the only archery event open to women, the double National round. She took 24th place in the event with 323 points.
