= Margaret Weedon =

British archer (1853–1930)

Margaret Kate Weedon (née Macrae, and formerly Mercer, 31 October 1853 – 19 October 1930) was a British archer who competed at the 1908 Summer Olympics in London. She was born in Lewes. Weedon competed at the 1908 Games in the only archery event open to women, the double National round competition. She took 14th place in the event with 498 points.
