= Dora Honnywill =

British archer (1870–1959)

Dora Honnywill (née Neve; 17 December 1870 – 18 March 1959) was a British archer who competed at the 1908 Summer Olympics in London. She was born in Benenden. Honnywill competed at the 1908 Games in the only archery event open to women, the double National round competition. She took fifth place in the event with 587 points.
