= Ina Wood =

British archer (1886–1961)

Personal information
- National team: Great Britain
- Born: 2 September 1886 Fittleworth, England
- Died: 25 January 1961 (aged 74)
- Occupation: Archer

Ina Wood (2 September 1886 – 25 January 1961) was a British archer. She competed at the 1908 Summer Olympics in London. Wood competed at the 1908 Games in the only archery event open to women, the double National round. She took 22nd place in the event with 387 points.
