= Gertrude Appleyard =

British archer (1865–1917)

Gertrude Appleyard (22 April 1865 – 9 June 1917) was a British archer. She competed at the 1908 Summer Olympics in London. Appleyard competed at the 1908 Games in the only archery event open to women, the double National round. She took 11th place in the event with 503 points.
