= James Fraser (police officer) =

British army and police officer

Sir James Fraser (c. 1816 – 13 April 1892) was a British army officer and senior police officer of the 19th century.

His first army commission was as an ensign in 1831, followed by lieutenant (1834), captain (1836), Brevet major (1846), major (1849), lieutenant colonel (1851) and finally colonel in 1854, both with his regiment and on the army staff, including command of two regiments and a time as lieutenant-colonel of the 72nd Highlanders.

He was made chief constable of the Berkshire Constabulary on 14 January 1856 after retiring from active army service earlier that month. He remained in that police role until being elected the second commissioner of the City of London Police at a Court of Common Council meeting on 21 May 1863, a role he held until resigning it in June 1890. He was made CB in 1869 and KCB in 1886.

Police appointments
New institution	Chief Constable of Berkshire Constabulary; 1856–1863	Succeeded by Adam Blandy
Preceded by Daniel Whittle Harvey	Commissioner of the City of London Police; 1863–1890	Succeeded by Henry Smith
