= Ernest Wingate-Saul =

Sir Ernest Wingate Wingate-Saul, KC (15 March 1873 – 13 December 1944) was a British barrister and judge.

== Background and education ==
Wingate-Saul was born in 1873, the son of William Wingate Wingate-Saul. He was educated at Rugby and Christ Church, Oxford, where he received the MA in October 1901. In 1897 he became a barrister of the Inner Temple, where he was elected a bencher in 1925.

== Legal career ==
Wingate-Saul was appointed a King's Counsel (KC) in 1919. He was Recorder of Preston and Judge and Assessor of Borough Court of Pleas from 1921 until 1928, and Judge of Appeal in the Isle of Man from 1925 until 1928. He was also Umpire under the Unemployment Insurance Act between 1928 and 1944, and was appointed an Umpire under the Reinstatment in Civil Employment Act shortly before his death in 1944.

He was knighted in 1933.

Wingate-Saul died in 1944. Wingate-Saul Road in Fairfield, Lancaster is named after him.

== Family ==
He married first, in 1902, Violet Satterthwaite (died 1935), daughter of Thomas Edmondson Stedman Satterthwaite, of Lancaster. They had three sons and two daughters. After his first wife's death, he married secondly, in 1938, Dorothy Sharpe, daughter of Edmund Sharpe, of Halton Hall, Lancaster.

His son Basil Wingate-Saul was a County Court judge and a circuit judge.
