= Henry Smith (police officer) =

Scottish police officer (1835–1921)

Lieutenant-Colonel Sir Henry Smith (15 December 1835 – 2 March 1921) was a Scottish police officer who was commissioner of the City of London Police.

Smith was born in Penpont, Dumfriesshire, Scotland, the son of Rev. George Smith of the Church of Scotland and Jane Hogarth. He was educated at Edinburgh Academy. After serving as a constable in a Scottish county force, he went to London in 1879. He was unanimously elected to the post on 28 July 1890, the first to hold the post after joining the same force as a constable. He had also been acting commissioner since the resignation of James Fraser.

Major (later Lieutenant-Colonel, Sir) Henry Smith had previously been acting commissioner for the City of London Police Force, as Sir James Fraser was on leave, when it was drawn into the investigation of the infamous 1888 Whitechapel Murders committed by an unknown serial killer known as Jack the Ripper. In the early morning hours of September 30, 1888 the killer murdered a woman by the name of Catherine Eddowes in Mitre Square, which was just inside the border of the City of London. Previous killings of the series (including a victim that had been murdered less than an hour prior to the Eddowes murder) had occurred within the jurisdiction of the Metropolitan Police. The City Police would therefore be involved in the Ripper investigation for the remainder of the series and would work alongside the Metropolitan Police in their unsuccessful efforts to identify the killer. Major Smith came to the site of the Eddowes murder and coordinated police efforts in person. In his 1910 memoir, Smith described how at sun up on the 30th he felt "defeated and exausted", and admitted that "(the Ripper) ...completely beat me and every Police officer in London.".

He was appointed a Companion of the Order of the Bath (CB) in 1896 and Knight Commander of the Order of the Bath (KCB) in 1897. He tendered his resignation as commissioner early in December 1902 due to friction with the Police Committee over the administration of the force and left office late that month.

He died in Edinburgh in 1921.

Police appointments
Preceded by James Fraser	Commissioner of the City of London Police; 1890–1902	Succeeded by William Nott-Bower
