= Beatrice Hill-Lowe =

Irish archer (1869–1951)

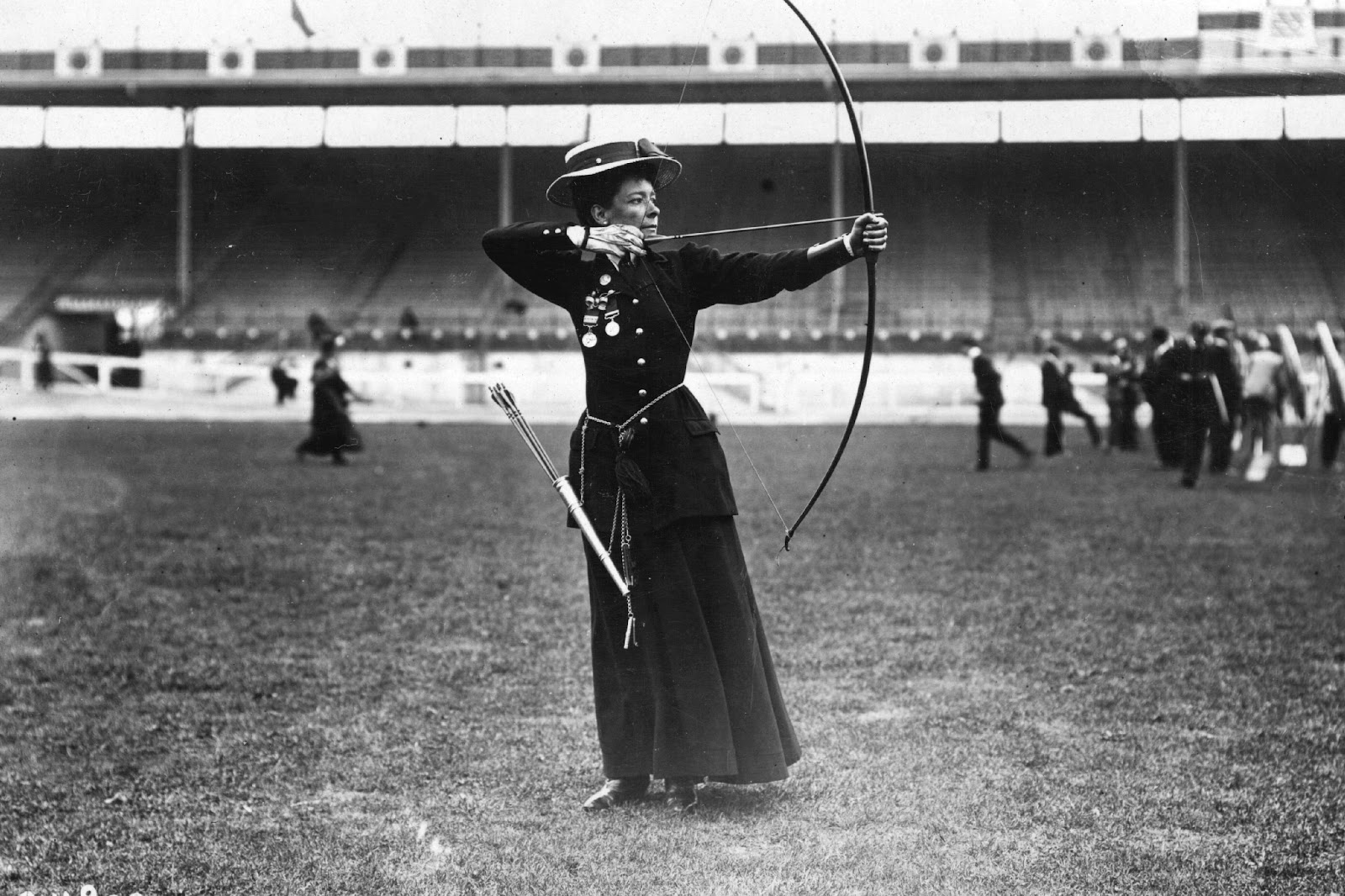
- Hill-Lowe at the 1908 Summer Olympics

Personal information
- Nationality: Irish
- Citizenship: British
- Born: Beatrice Geraldine Hill Ruxton; 26 January 1869 Ardee House, Ardee, County Louth, Ireland, United Kingdom of Great Britain and Ireland
- Died: 2 July 1951 (aged 82) 12 Queen's Parade, Tenby, Wales, United Kingdom

Sport
- Country: Great Britain
- Sport: Archery
- Event: Women's double National
Medal record
Women's Archery
Representing Great Britain
Olympic Games
Bronze medal – third place	1908 London	Double National round

Beatrice Geraldine Hill-Lowe (26 January 1869 – 2 July 1951) was an Irish archer who represented Britain. She was born in County Louth, Ireland. She was the first Irishwoman to win an Olympic medal. She won a bronze medal at the 1908 Summer Olympics in London.

== Early life and career ==
Hill-Lowe was born in Ardee House in County Louth, Ireland (then part of the United Kingdom of Great Britain and Ireland) on 26 January 1869. Her parents were William Ruxton, a landowner and vice-lieutenant for County Louth, and Caroline Diana (née Vernon). She had five older sisters and 3 older brothers. She married Arthur Hill Ommanney Peter Hill-Lowe, a Royal Navy Commander who had been married once before and had a daughter called Ada, on 15 July 1891 at St Mary's Abbey Church (Church of Ireland), Ardee, and she moved to Court of Hill, Nash, south Shropshire, near Tenbury Wells, England. They had two children, Arthur Noel Vernon, born in 1892, and Sibyl, born in 1897.

She began competing in local archery competitions in 1894. In 1908, Archery was the only sport available to women in which they could take part in the Olympic games because it involved no running, enabling women to be fully clothed while partaking. It was a sport which involved costly equipment and access to private land in which would enable them to practise on. In 1908 Olympics Ireland was still under British rule, meaning there was no Irish team to exist, and any athletes wishing to partake were obliged to compete under the Union Jack flag.

Hill-Lowe was the first Irish woman to win an Olympic medal. Hill-Lowe competed in the Double national round, which entailed of 25 competitors, all being British or Irish. The double national round was one of three archery events taking place. In this event, each round contained 48 arrows shot at 60 yards, and 24 arrows shot at 50 yards (Olympian., 2019). Both rounds were held on Friday 17 and Saturday 18 July 1908, where a total of 144 arrows were shot over 2 rounds. On the first day, Lottie Dodd was in the lead with a total of 348 points and 66 hits, and Queenie Newall with a score of 338 points. On the second day, Newall scored a total of 350 points and Lottie Dodd 294. Beatrice-Hill Lowe fell into third place with a total score of 618 points (DOD et al., 2019 leaving her 70 points short of the winner Newall, who was 54 years old at the time. (Olympian., 2019)

Her husband died on 17 April 1910. She married Lieutenant-Colonel Roland Wycliffe Thompson on 29 June 1911 in Penally, Pembrokeshire, Wales. They lived between Penally and Newbridge Lodge in County Kildare, Ireland, before moving to 12 Queen's Parade in Tenby, Pembrokeshire, where Thompson died on 15 April 1940. During the Second World War, she worked with the British Legion women's committee in charge of the Tenby Rectory Depot. She died at 12 Queen's Parade on 2 July 1951.

The County Museum Dundalk featured Hill-Lowe in an exhibition in 2012.

== Sources ==
- Cook, Theodore Andrea (1908). The Fourth Olympiad, Being the Official Report. London: British Olympic Association.
- De Wael, Herman (2001). "Archery 1908". Herman's Full Olympians. Archived from the original on 29 September 2006.
- Evans, Hilary; Gjerde, Arild; Heijmans, Jeroen; Mallon, Bill; et al. "Beatrice Hill-Lowe". Olympics at Sports-Reference.com. Sports Reference LLC. Archived from the original on 3 December 2016.
