= Mike Bowron =

Chief Officer of the States of Jersey Police

Michael Bowron QPM

Chief Officer of the States of Jersey Police
- In office 4 January 2011 – July 2017

Personal details
- Education: Surrey University
- Profession: Senior Police Officer

Michael Bowron is a retired British police officer. From 2011 to July 2017 he was chief officer of States of Jersey Police. He was previously the commissioner of the City of London Police from 2006 to 2011.

== Early life ==
Bowron was educated at Sussex University, where he achieved a Bachelor of Arts (BA) in Sociology.

== Career ==
Bowron worked as a broker for Lloyd's of London before joining Sussex Police in 1980.

In 2006, he was appointed commissioner of the City of London Police. He graduated from the FBI Academy in 2007. In 2010, Bowron played a key role in setting up the National Fraud Intelligence Bureau.

On 4 January 2011, he transferred to the States of Jersey Police to become its chief officer.

== Honours ==

Ribbon	Description	Notes
	Queen's Police Medal (QPM)	
	Queen Elizabeth II Golden Jubilee Medal	2002; UK Version of this Medal
	Queen Elizabeth II Diamond Jubilee Medal	2012; UK Version of this Medal
	Police Long Service and Good Conduct Medal	

Police appointments
Preceded by unknown	Assistant Commissioner of the City of London Police; 2002–2006	Succeeded by Unknown
Preceded by James Hart	Commissioner of the City of London Police; 2006–2011	Succeeded by Adrian Leppard
