= Janetta Vance =

British archer (1855–1921)

Janetta Vance (16 February 1855 – 15 November 1921) was a British archer. She competed at the 1908 Summer Olympics in London, in the only archery event open to women, the double National round. She took 23rd place in the event with 385 points.
