= Hilda Williams =

British Olympic archer (1876 – 1922)

Hilda Williams (1876 – 1922) was a British archer who competed in the 1908 Summer Olympics. She usually shot with the Mid-Surrey Archery Club. At the 1908 Olympics, Williams was one of 25 British women who entered the Ladies' Double National Round, one of three archery events that year and the only one admitting women. She finished in twenty-fifth place with 82 hits and 316 points.
