= Hugh Turnbull =

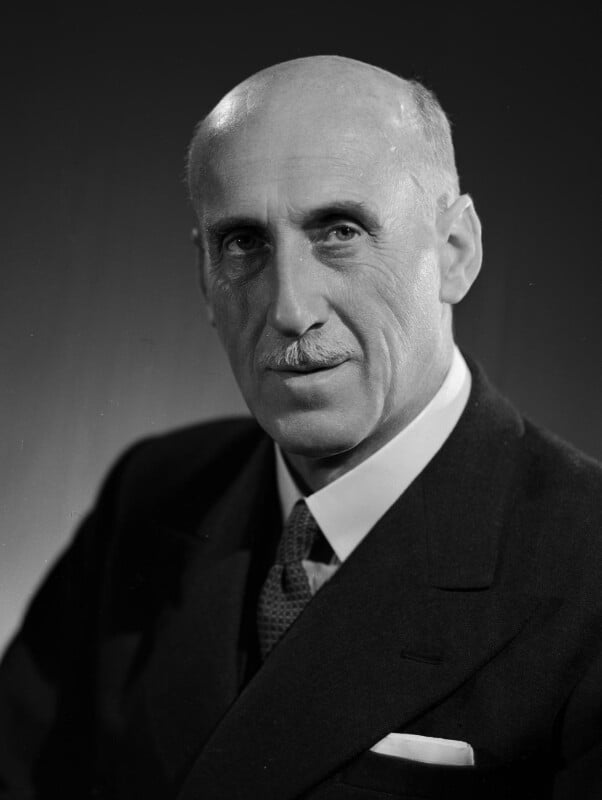
Turnbull in 1947

Lieutenant-Colonel Sir Hugh Stephenson Turnbull (25 August 1882 – 9 January 1973) was a British Army officer and senior police officer. His army commands included 2/7th Battalion Gordon Highlanders. He served as commissioner of the City of London Police from 1925 to April 1950.

He is the father of Lt. Col. John Turnbull, who was awarded the Military Cross for his engagement in Tunisia.

Police appointments
| Preceded by William Nott-Bower | Commissioner of the City of London Police; 1925–1950 | Succeeded by Arthur Young |
