= Jessie Wadworth =

British archer (1863–1936)

Jessie Ellen Wadworth (née Brown, 12 November 1863 – 8 July 1936) was a British archer who competed at the 1908 Summer Olympics in London. She was born in Devizes and was the mother of Brenda Wadworth. Wadworth competed at the 1908 Games in the only archery event open to women, the double National round competition. She took fourth place in the event with 605 points.
