= Ian Dyson =

British police officer

Commissioner Ian Dyson QPM DL
- Born: Epsom, Surrey, England
- Police career
- Country: United Kingdom
- Department: City of London Police
- Service years: 1983–2022
- Rank: Commissioner
- Awards: Queen's Police Medal (2015)

Ian Christopher Dyson (born 26 October 1960) is a retired senior British police officer, having previously been the commissioner and the assistant commissioner of the City of London Police

== Early life and education ==
Dyson was born on 26 October 1960 in Epsom, Surrey, England. He was educated at Kingston Grammar School, then a direct grant grammar school in Kingston upon Thames, London. He studied history at the University of Leeds, graduating with a Bachelor of Arts (BA) degree.

== Police career ==
Dyson began his police career in 1983 with the Metropolitan Police. He served in that force until 2008, when he moved to Surrey Police as an assistant chief constable. In 2010, he then moved to the City of London Police as commander, being promoted to assistant commissioner in 2012. He was appointed commissioner of the City of London Police effective 1 January 2016. In May 2021, Dyson announced his retirement and was succeeded by Commissioner Angela McLaren who took up her post on 3 January 2022.

== Honours ==

Ribbon	Description	Notes
	Queen's Police Medal (QPM)	2015
	Queen Elizabeth II Golden Jubilee Medal	2002
	Queen Elizabeth II Diamond Jubilee Medal	2012
	Queen Elizabeth II Platinum Jubilee Medal	2022
	Police Long Service and Good Conduct Medal	2005

In 2022, he was commissioned as Deputy Lieutenant (DL) of Greater London.

Police appointments
Preceded by Adrian Leppard	Commissioner of the City of London Police; 2016-2021	Succeeded by Angela McLaren
