= James Hart (police officer) =

British police commissioner (1947–2024)

James Maurice Hart (10 September 1947 – 31 October 2024) was a British police officer who was commissioner of the City of London Police between June 2002 and June 2006. In this role, he worked closely with the chairman of the Police Committee, Simon Walsh, and chaired the force's senior decision-making forum, the Strategic Management Board (SMB). He was Chairman of the Association of Chief Police Officers (ACPO) 'Economic Crime' portfolio and a regular public speaker on matters relating to economic crime and counter terrorism. He has completed the Government Cabinet Office 'Top Management' programme and was a graduate of the FBI National Executive Institute.

Prior to joining the City of London Police as assistant commissioner in 1998, his previous police service was with the Surrey and Metropolitan Police Services, and included extensive and varied operational experience in senior posts at Heathrow Airport and Notting Hill, with divisional command positions at Wandsworth and the Diplomatic Protection Group.

At a strategic level he headed the commissioner's policy unit at New Scotland Yard, and was a member of a small team of senior staff implementing a major restructuring of the Metropolitan Police. He was the national co-ordinator of the Operational Policing Review, published in 1990. He was co-author of 'Neighbourhood Policing (1981) which was further developed in his thesis 'The Management of Change in Police Organisations' published in 2004.

As assistant chief constable of the Surrey Police, he initially held the support services portfolio, with responsibility for human resources, finance, information technology and administration of justice. Responsibility for both general and specialist operational matters followed, including management of the territorial divisions, and overall responsibility for partnership activities - working with statutory and voluntary agencies within the county to enhance community safety and crime reduction. His specialist operations role included responsibility for all serious and organised crime investigations, mobile and operational support, forensic science and major incident and emergency response.

Hart attended the Joint Services Defence Course at the Royal Naval College, Greenwich, and the Senior Command Course at the Police Staff College, Bramshill. He held a B.Sc.(Hons) degree in Systems Science and Management, and a PhD in Systems Science, both from the City University, London. In 2004 he was conferred with the degree of Doctor of Science from the City University, where he was a visiting professor, chairman of the Alumni Association and a member of the university's advisory board.

He was a Companion of the Chartered Management Institute. Hart was awarded the Queen's Police Medal in the 1999 Queen's Birthday Honours list and a CBE in the 2007 Queens Birthday Honours list.

Hart died unexpectedly whilst on a cruise, on 31 October 2024, at the age of 77.

== Honours ==

Ribbon	Description	Notes
	Queen's Police Medal (QPM)	1999
	Queen Elizabeth II Golden Jubilee Medal	
	Police Long Service and Good Conduct Medal	

Police appointments
Preceded by Perry Nove	Commissioner of the City of London Police; 2002–2006	Succeeded by Mike Bowron
