= Alice Legh =

British archer (1855–1948)

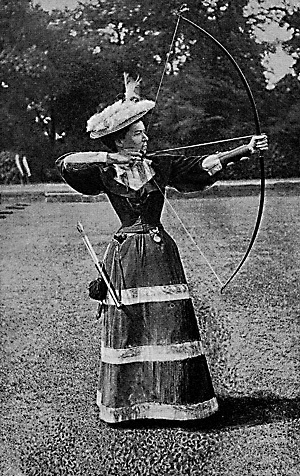
Alice Legh, circa 1894

Alice Blanche Legh (1855 – 3 January 1948) was a famous British archer. She has been called "the greatest British woman archer of all-time" and "the greatest British archer ever". Her mother, known as Mrs Piers Legh, won the British national championship four times.

From 1881 to 1922, she won the national ladies' archery championship twenty-three times. In 1908, she declined to compete at the London Olympics in order to prepare for her defense of the national title a week later. She successfully defended the title against Queenie Newall, the Olympic gold medal winner, by a large margin. She held the title for a record eight consecutive years between 1902 and 1909. The only international competition she is known to have participated in is a contest at Le Touquet in 1905, although the opportunity was open to her on several occasions. She retired from archery in 1922 at the age of sixty-seven.

Legh died at Resthaven nursing home in Stroud, Gloucestershire, on 3 January 1948. She is buried at Minchinhampton.
