= William Nott-Bower =

British police commissioner (1849–1939)

Captain Commissioner Sir William Nott-Bower KCVO
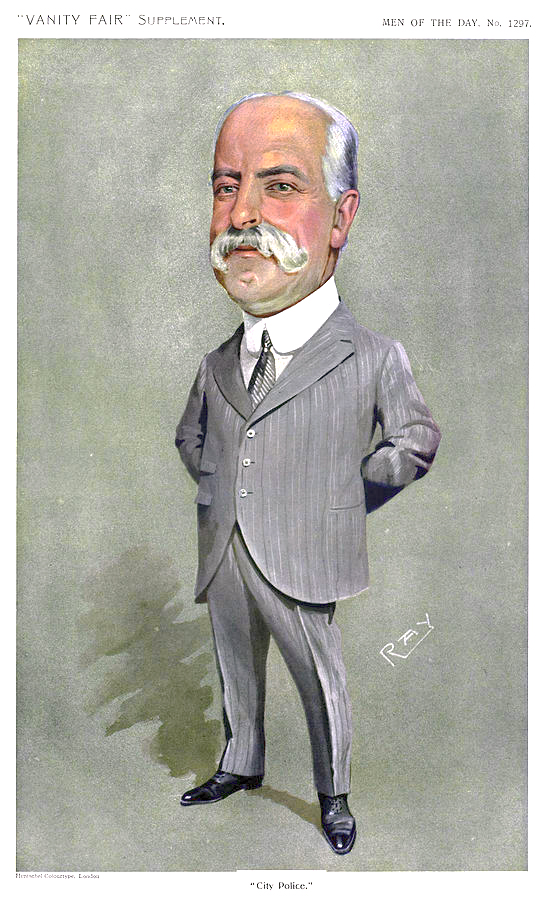

Commissioner of Police of the City of London
- In office 1902–1925
- Preceded by: Lieutenant-Colonel Sir Henry Smith
- Succeeded by: Lieutenant-Colonel Sir Hugh Turnbull

Personal details
- Born: John William Nott Bower; 20 March 1849 York, Yorkshire, England
- Died: 4 February 1939 (aged 89) Richmond, Surrey, England
- Profession: Police officer

Sir John William Nott-Bower (20 March 1849 – 4 February 1939) was a British officer and commissioner of the City of London Police.

== Biography ==
Bower was born in York, the son of Dr. John Bower, and grandson of Sir William Nott. The barrister Sir Edmund Ernest Nott-Bower, was a brother. He was educated at Cheltenham and Sandhurst, and served in the army in the King's Regiment. He was later appointed a captain of the 5th (Militia) Battalion, West Yorkshire Regiment.

Bower was transferred to the Royal Irish Constabulary, then served as chief constable of Leeds, before he was appointed head constable of Liverpool in October 1881. The police force in Liverpool was the largest in the country, and gave a thorough knowledge of police administration on an extensive scale.

In March 1902 he was elected commissioner of Police of the City of London, serving as such until 1925.

== Honours ==

He was knighted in 1911, was appointed a Commander of the Royal Victorian Order (CVO) the same year, and was later promoted to a Knight Commander (KCVO) in the order.

== Family ==
Bower married, on 1 June 1889, Florence Harrison, daughter of Reginald Harrison. Their son was Sir John Nott-Bower (1892–1972), who later headed the London Metropolitan Police.

Police appointments
Preceded by Henry Smith	Commissioner of the City of London Police; 1902–1925	Succeeded by Hugh Turnbull
