= City of London Police =

English territorial police force

Agency overview
- Formed: 1839; 187 years ago
- Annual budget: £151 million

Jurisdictional structure
- Operations jurisdiction: City of London, England, United Kingdom
- Area served by the City of London Police
- Area: 1.1 sq mi / 2.8 km²
- Population: 8,700 (residents); 513,000 (workers)
- Legal jurisdiction: England and Wales
- Governing body: Common Council of the City of London
- Constituting instrument: City of London Police Act 1839
- General nature: Local civilian police

Operational structure
- Overseen by: His Majesty's Inspectorate of Constabulary and Fire & Rescue Services; Independent Office for Police Conduct
- Headquarters: Guildhall
- Police officers: 958
- Police staffs: 494
- Agency executive: Peter O'Doherty, Commissioner
- Directorates: 5

Facilities
- Stations: 1

Website
- www.cityoflondon.police.uk

The City of London Police is the territorial police force responsible for law enforcement within the City of London, England, including the Middle and Inner Temples. It covers an area of approximately one square mile. The force is a separate organisation from the much larger Metropolitan Police, which is responsible for law enforcement within the remainder of the London region. As the historic core of London, the City has an administrative history distinct from that of the rest of the metropolis leading to a separate police force.

As of 2021, the force had a workforce of 1,355 including 861 full-time police officers and 494 support staff. The force is also supported by much smaller numbers of special constables, police community support officers, and designated officers. The headquarters is temporarily located at the Guildhall (which also housed it from 1832 to 1840) and there is an additional station at Bishopsgate, with former stations including Moor Lane (destroyed in the Blitz on 29 December 1940), Cloak Lane (closed 1965), and Wood Street (closed 2020).

The City of London Police is the smallest territorial police force in England and Wales, both in terms of geographic area and head-count. The current commissioner (equivalent to the chief constable in non-London forces), is Peter O'Doherty, who was appointed in a temporary capacity in October 2023 and a permanent one in 2024.

As of 2026, it is also the national lead police force for fraud, having responsibility for the Report Fraud service operated by the National Fraud Intelligence Bureau.

== History ==
=== To 1850 ===
City of London Police Act 1839
- Act of Parliament
- Parliament of the United Kingdom
- Long title: An Act for regulating the Police in the City of London.
- Citation: 2 & 3 Vict. c. xciv
- Territorial extent: United Kingdom

Dates
- Royal assent: 17 August 1839
- Commencement: 25 December 1839 (Note: Section 1.)
Other legislation
Repeals/revokes	Watching (City of London) Act 1736
Amended by	City of London (Various Powers) Act 1911; City of London Police Act 1919; City of London (Various Powers) Act 1920; Police Pensions Act 1921; Representation of the People Act 1948; Justices of the Peace Act 1949; City of London (Various Powers) Act 1956; House of Commons Disqualification Act 1957; City of London (Various Powers) Act 1958; Street Offences Act 1959; City of London (Various Powers) Act 1959; Betting and Gaming Act 1960; City of London (Various Powers) Act 1961; Penalties for Drunkenness Act 1962; Betting, Gaming and Lotteries Act 1963; Police Act 1964; Criminal Justice Act 1967; Justices of the Peace Act 1968; Theatres Act 1968; Police Act 1969; City of London (Various Powers) Act 1979; Public Order Act 1986; Protection of Animals (Amendment) Act 1988; Statute Law (Repeals) Act 1989; Statute Law (Repeals) Act 2008
Relates to	Metropolitan Police Act 1839

Status: Amended

Text of statute as originally enacted

Traditionally the responsibility for policing in the city had been divided between day and night City Watch, primarily under the two sheriffs. Their responsibilities were shared with the aldermen's officers – the ward beadles – who are now purely ceremonial. It was these officers' responsibility to ensure that the Night Watch was maintained. Policing during the day eventually came under the City Patrol, which evolved into the City Day Police, which was modelled on the Metropolitan Police. The London City Police was officially formed in 1832, before becoming the City of London Police with the passing of the City of London Police Act 1839, which gave statutory approval to the force as an independent police body and headed off attempts made to merge it with the Metropolitan Police. It moved its headquarters from the corporation's Guildhall to 26 Old Jewry in 1840.

=== 1850–1989 ===
The first death of an officer of the force in the line of duty occurred in 1857, followed by 31 more to date, including three killed in the 1910 Houndsditch murders. The force was involved in the investigation of the Jack the Ripper murders.

Teams of the City of London Police have participated in the Olympic games three times in the tug of war tournament. At the 1908 Summer Olympics they won the gold medal, beating a Liverpool City Police team in the final. In 1912 a joint City-Metropolitan Police team was beaten in the final by a Stockholm Police team. At the 1920 Summer Olympics a solely City of London Police British team regained its title, beating the Netherlands. This was the last time tug of war was an Olympic sport, which means the City of London Police is still the reigning Olympic champion.

The force has had special constables since at least 1911, when 1,648 were called for duty during docks strikes. There was one day in 1918, when the only warranted officer within the city of London was a special constable. Several regular officers of the force were killed in Nazi German air raids over London in 1941 and 1942.

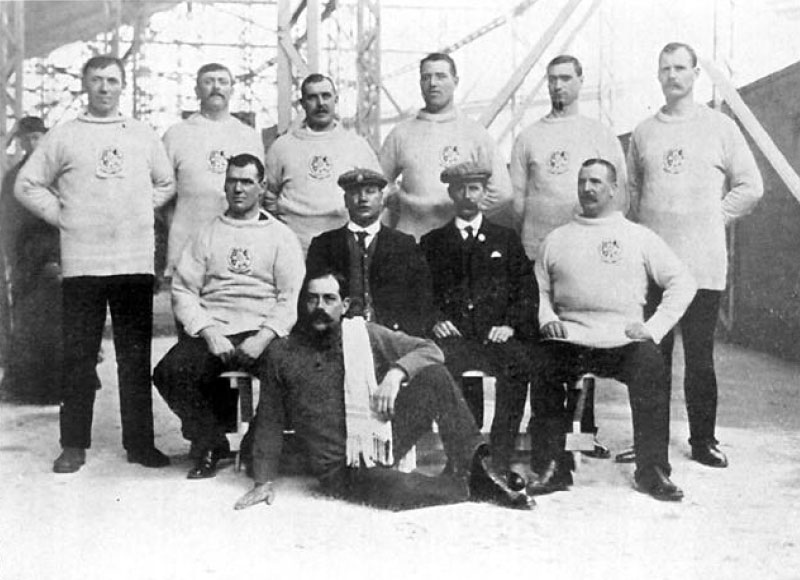
The gold medal-winning City of London Police team at the 1908 Summer Olympics

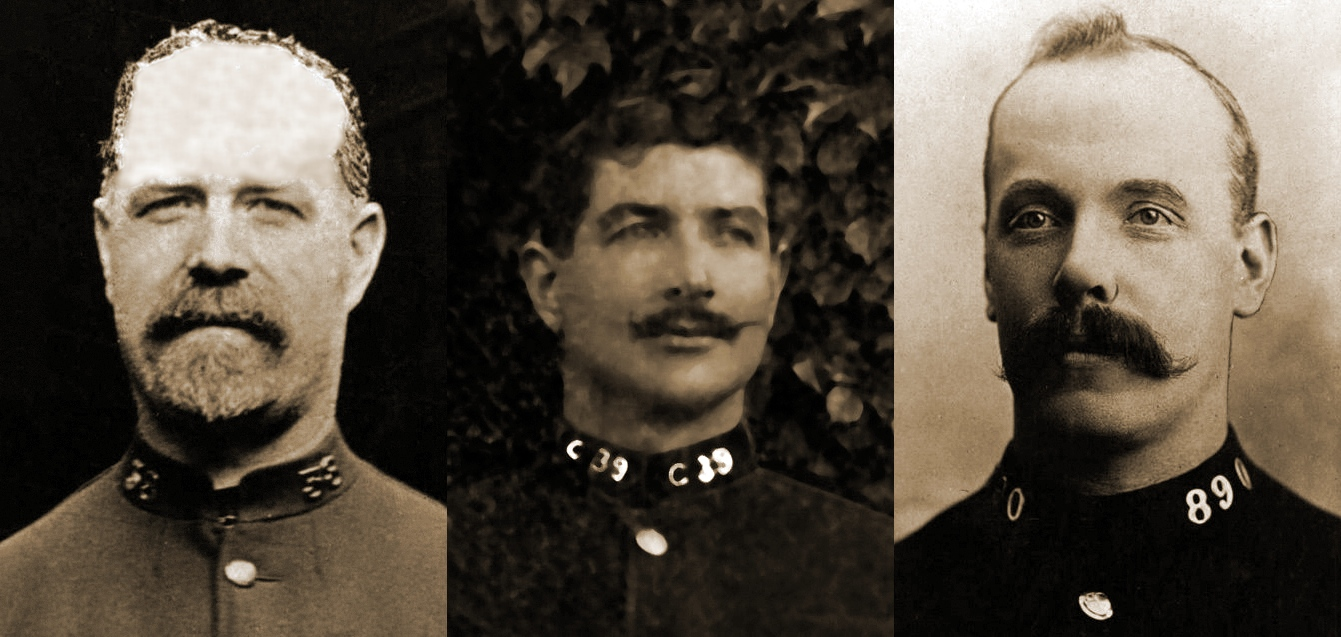
Sergeants Tucker and Bentley and Constable Choate, murdered while on duty on 16 December 1910

=== 1990–2001 ===
The early 1990s saw the IRA carry out a number of high-profile attacks in the city as part of the Troubles, such as the 1992 Baltic Exchange bombing and the 1993 Bishopsgate bombing, resulting in huge economic and infrastructural damage. As a result, the Traffic and Environmental Zone, better known as the "ring of steel", was officially established in 1993 by Owen Kelly, the then City of London Police commissioner. Commander Hugh Moore suffered a fatal heart failure in 1993 following a violent arrest.

Some aspects of the ring of steel were 'stepped down' in the late 1990s following the cessation of IRA hostilities, but stepped up again after the September 11 attacks. The force's headquarters relocated to Wood Street in 2001.

=== 2001–present ===
The City of London Special Constabulary were awarded the Ferrers Trophy in 2006 for the efforts of their officers after the 7 July 2005 London bombings. The award is given annually to police volunteers, for exceptional dedication and innovation. It was the first time in the award's history that an entire special constabulary received the trophy. In 2010 the same trophy was awarded to Special Constable Patrick Rarden of the Honourable Artillery Company Detachment (part of the City of London Special Constabulary) for using his banking skills and experience to help train colleagues and provide invaluable assistance to solve fraud cases. 2002 saw the most recent City officer to die in the line of duty.

In 2014, the force was chosen to be the lead force for fraud, overseen by the National Crime Agency, to operate the National Fraud Intelligence Bureau (NFIB) and cybercrime reporting centre. This includes the 'Report Fraud' (formerly 'Action Fraud') service for gathering and analysing reports of fraud and financially motivated cyber crime reported by the public.

In 2015, the City of London Police mounted unit also escorted the exhumed remains of King Richard III through the city of Leicester from St Nicholas Church to Leicester Cathedral, en route to their reburial.

== List of commissioners ==
- Daniel Whittle Harvey (1839–1863)
- Colonel Sir James Fraser (1863–1890)
- Lieutenant-Colonel Sir Henry Smith (1890–1902)
- Captain Sir William Nott-Bower (1902–1925)
- Lieutenant-Colonel Sir Hugh Turnbull (1925–1950)
- Colonel Sir Arthur Young (1950–1971)
- James Page (1971–1977)
- Peter Marshall (1977–1985)
- Owen Kelly (1985–1994)
- William Taylor (1994–1998)
- Perry Nove (1998–2002)
- James Hart (2002–2006)
- Mike Bowron (2006–2011)
- Adrian Leppard (2011–2015)
- Ian Dyson (2016–2022)
- Angela McLaren (2022–2023)
- Peter O'Doherty (2023–present)

== Organisation ==
The City Police is organised into five directorates:

- Economic Crime Directorate
- Crime Directorate
- Uniformed Policing Directorate
- Information and Intelligence Directorate
- Business Support Directorate

Because of the City's role as a world financial centre, the City of London Police has developed a great deal of expertise in dealing with economic crime. In 2014, it was made the national lead police force for fraud.

The Economic Crime Directorate includes:

- Dedicated Card and Payment Crime Unit (DCPCU)
- Insurance Fraud Department (IFED)
- National Fraud Intelligence Bureau (NFIB) and Report Fraud (formerly 'Action Fraud')
- Police Intellectual Property Crime Unit (PIPCU)
- Economic Crime Academy (ECA) responsible for delivering counter fraud and economic crime training both nationally and internationally
- The Directorate also had an Overseas Anti-Corruption Unit (OACU). This unit (along with the Metropolitan Police's Proceeds of Corruption Unit) was transferred to the National Crime Agency in 2015 and renamed the International Corruption Unit (ICU).

=== Leadership structure ===
Chief officer team:

- Commissioner – Peter O'Doherty
- Deputy Commissioner Local – Paul Betts
- Deputy Commissioner National – Nik Adams
- Commander – Umer Khan
- Commander – Tor Garnett
- Service Delivery Director – Chris Bell
- Chief Operating Officer – Alix Newbold
- Joint Chief Finance Officer – Alistair "Ally" Cook

== Uniform ==
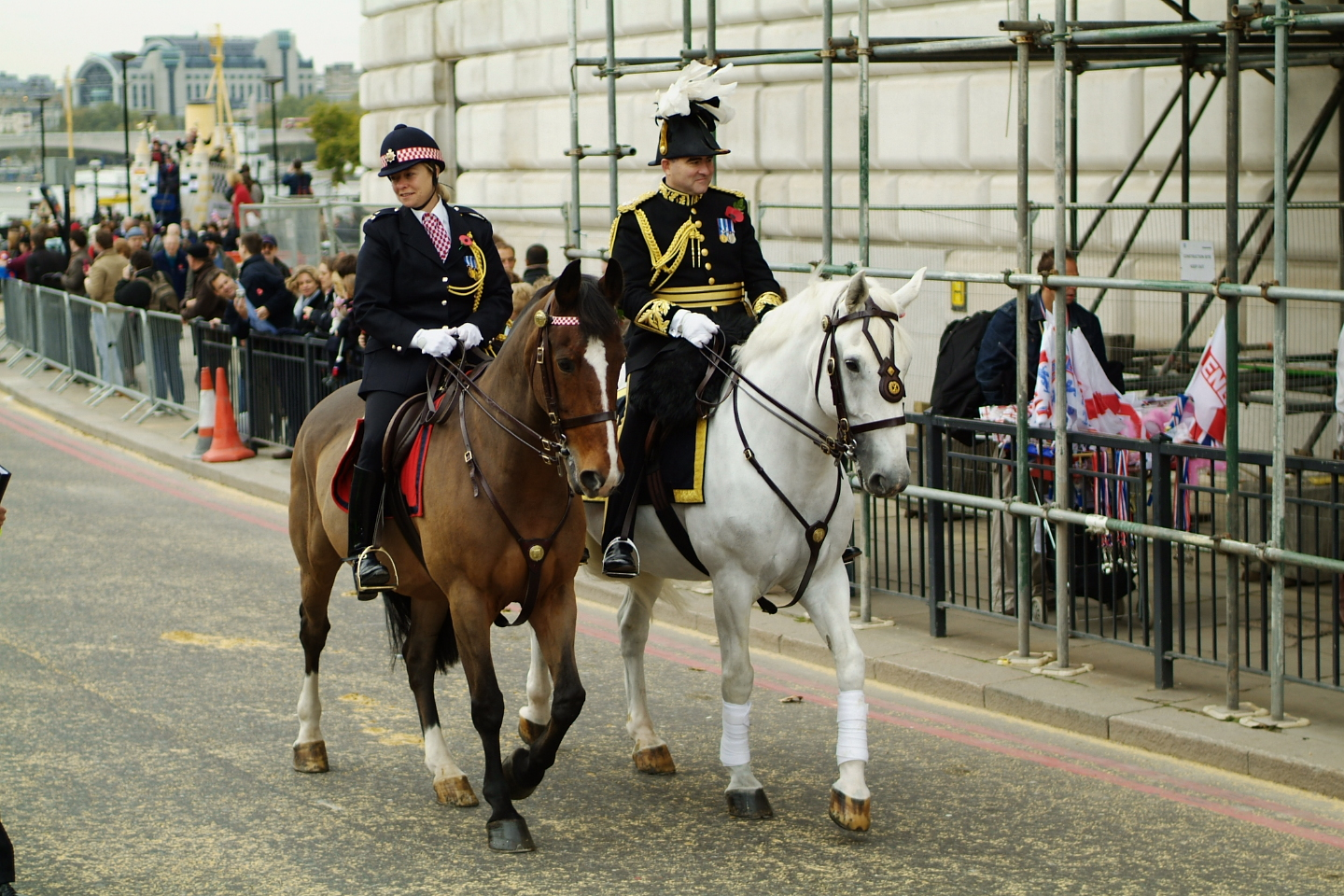
Assistant Commissioner in ceremonial full-dress uniform for the Lord Mayor's Show.

Whereas the majority of British police forces have white metal cap badges and buttons, those of the City Police are brass. The force also have red and white chequered sleeve and cap bands (matching the colours of the City of London), which in most other British police forces are black and white. In formal uniform, female officers wear a red and white cravat.

Their helmet (worn by male constables and sergeants) has altered little since its introduction in 1865 and has a crest instead of the white metal boss worn on the Metropolitan Police helmet. The "helmet plate" or badge is the City of London coat of arms; this is unusual for a police force in England and Wales in that it does not include St Edward's Crown, neither does it have the Brunswick Star, which is used on most other police helmets in England and Wales.

On state and ceremonial occasions, the commissioner and assistant commissioners wear a special court dress uniform with a gold aiguillette and a cocked hat adorned with white swan's feathers; other than on these occasions, they wear standard uniform.

== Equipment and vehicles ==
City of London police officers carry warrant cards like officers in other forces. Like most other police forces in Great Britain, City of London police officers are not routinely armed, but some officers have received firearms training and are authorised firearms officers. City of London police equipment includes PAVA irritant spray, batons, and handcuffs. Many officers are also equipped with Taser electroshock weapons; according to the police force's reported figures, Tasers are deployed (including drawing or "red-dotting") about seven times per month. In the September 2018 to September 2020 period, the City of London Police recorded 11 incidents of police officers firing Tasers on suspects.

The City of London Police maintains a fleet of police vehicles, including SUVs, compact cars, motorcycles, and vans, as well as one horsebox. All of the force's response vehicles carry a defibrillator and first aid supplies for use in the event of an emergency.

Patrol cars

Crime scene investigation

Armed response vehicle

Task force van

== Mounted unit ==
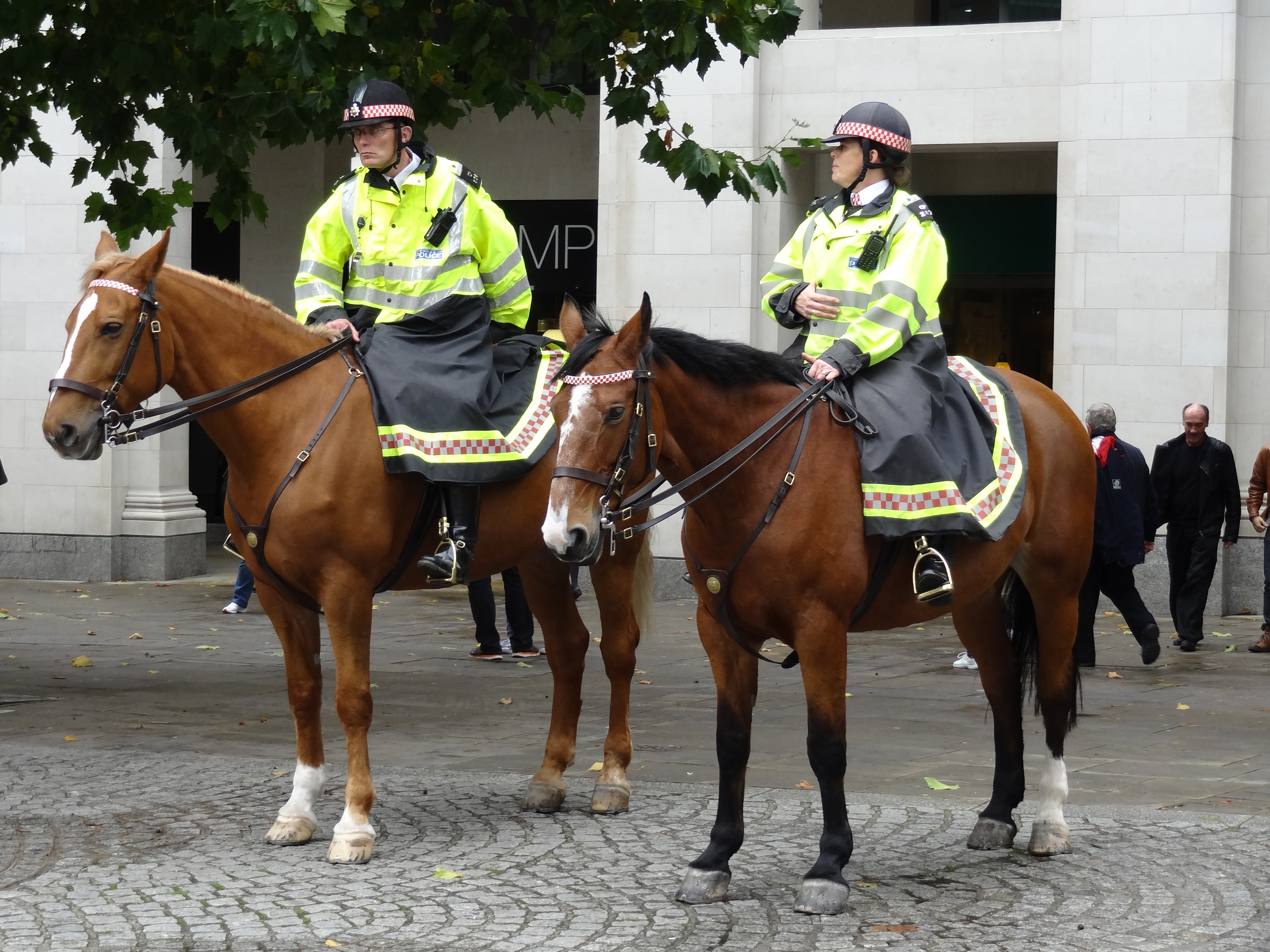
Mounted Section officers

The City of London Police maintains a mounted police unit. In addition to regular duties, the horses of the mounted unit have been used to trample wildflower seeds at the Barbican Wildlife Garden at the request of the community wildlife gardeners. The horses' ceremonial duties include participation in Trooping the Colour and the Lord Mayor's Show.

== Ranks ==
The ranks from constable to chief superintendent are the same as all other British police forces. The three senior ranks are similar to those used by the Metropolitan Police.

=== Insignia ===
Constables and sergeants display collar numbers on their rank badges (in the range 1 to 150 for sergeants and 151 to 999 for constables). Officers between the ranks of inspector and chief superintendent (who do not have collar numbers) display their warrant numbers instead.

City of London Police ranks and insignia
Rank	Commissioner	Deputy commissioner	Commander	Chief superintendent	Superintendent	Chief inspector	Inspector	Sergeant	Constable
Insignia									
Note	City of London Police insignia are worn on square patches on the upper arm of working dress or on the epaulettes in more formal dress.								

The City of London police also has a special constabulary with seven ranks of officers. As with regular officers, constables and sergeants display collar numbers on their rank badges (in the range 1001 to 1099 for sergeants and 1101 to 1299 for constables) and the ranks of inspector and chief inspector display their warrant numbers, in all cases followed by the letters "SC".

City of London Special Constabulary ranks and insignia
Rank	Special chief inspector	Special inspector	Special sergeant	Special constable
Insignia				
Note	City of London Police insignia are worn on square patches on the upper arm of working dress or on the epaulettes in more formal dress.; Honourable Artillery Company special constables wear the letters HAC in addition.			

As well as a PCSO rank

Police community support officer rank
Insignia	Examples of PCSO epaulettes in the City of London Police

=== Workforce ===
The following is the 2021 released workforce data. The "chief officer" category includes the commissioner, assistant commissioner and commanders, and the "special constable" category includes all special constable ranks.

City of London Police Workforce
Rank	Police staff	Police support volunteer	Designated Officer	PCSO	Special constable	Constable	Sergeant	Inspector	Chief inspector	Superintendent	Chief superintendent	Chief officer
Female personnel	295	5	0	1	17	156	24	14	9	5	1	1
Male personnel	211	14	0	4	62	485	96	29	18	10	6	4
Total personnel	506	19	0	5	79	641	120	43	27	15	7	5
Reference	2021 Police workforce open data tables											

== Special Constabulary ==
As of December 2023, it consists of 47 volunteer officers, led by a special chief inspector, assisted by two special inspectors, six special sergeants and 38 special constables. The majority undertake duties during evenings and nights in support of the regular force in dealing with issues arising from the busy night-time economy of the city. However, other officers perform more specialist roles in the force's other directorates including supporting the National Lead Force (NLF) in the National Fraud Intelligence Bureau (NFIB) with a number of officers joining the national Cyber Volunteering initiative.

In 2023, the City of London Police undertook a major restructure of the COLP Special Constabulary, with the ranks of special commander and special superintendent being abolished and the chief officer now being special chief inspector who reports to the chief superintendent for local policing who in turn answers to the commander for ops and Security.

Many officers have specialist training and perform duties as response drivers, "Level 2" public order officers and cycle officers. As in all forces, special constables are expected to commit to a minimum of 200 hours' duty each year, and in return receive out-of-pocket expenses and free travel on the Transport for London network. They receive no pay.

Uniform and equipment is identical to that of regular (full-time) police officers. Officers of the Honourable Artillery Company Detachment of Special Constabulary CLSC (originally part of the Metropolitan Special Constabulary but moved to the City force on reorganisation) wear the title "HAC" when in formal uniform. Special Constables have four-digit collar numbers beginning 11 or 12, and Special Sergeants have four-digit collar numbers beginning 10.

=== Chief Officers of City of London Special Constabulary ===
- Colonel Vickers Dunfee (1911–1914)
- Colonel JW Benningfield (1914–1918)
- Colonel Vickers Dunfee (1918–1927)
- Colonel RT Blackham (1927–1928)
- WG Lovell (1928–1933)
- GT Foxon (1933–1944)
- W Penman (1944–1952)
- Colonel A Woods (1952–1966)
- HE Wright (1966–1974)
- Major SC Holmes (1975–1982)
- F AD Ralfe (1983–1988)
- J Hurcombe-Blight (1988–1999)
- B Willis (1999–2004)
- Ian Miller (2004–2016)
- James Phipson (2016–2023)
- Philip Nastri (2023–present)

== Other corporation policing bodies ==
The City of London Corporation, the local authority for the city, also operates further limited policing bodies. These bodies are not part of the City of London Police:

- City of London market constabularies;
- Hampstead Heath Constabulary (parks); and
- Epping Forest Keepers.

== See also ==
- National Fraud Intelligence Bureau
- Law enforcement in the United Kingdom
- List of law enforcement agencies in the United Kingdom, Crown Dependencies and British Overseas Territories
- Project Griffin
