= Albertine Thackwell =

British archer (1863–1944)

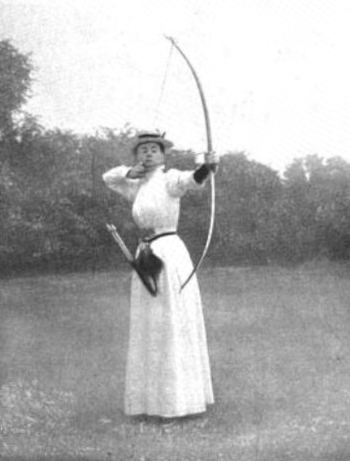
- In The Sketch, 17 August 1898
- Born: Albertine Anne Thackwell; 19 June 1863; Alcester, England
- Died: 22 September 1944 (aged 81); Little Comberton, England
- Occupation: Archer

Albertine Anne Thackwell (19 June 1863 – 22 September 1944) was a British archer who competed at the 1908 Summer Olympics in London. She was born in Alcester. Thackwell competed at the 1908 Games in the only archery event open to women, the double National round competition. She took 15th place in the event with 484 points.

She died at her home in Little Comberton on 22 September 1944.
