= Justice Defenders =

Charitable organization

Justice Defenders (formerly African Prisons Project, or APP) is a registered UK charity and U.S. nonprofit working in prison communities across Africa. Through legal education, training, and practice, Justice Defenders equips prisoners and prison officers to facilitate legal processes. It establishes law practices within prisons, provides free services, and runs legal awareness clinics for prisoners. And in partnership with academic institutions, it tutors and facilitates law degrees for prisoners and prison officers. Justice Defenders was founded in 2007 by the British activist Alexander McLean, who is currently the director.

== Organizational history ==
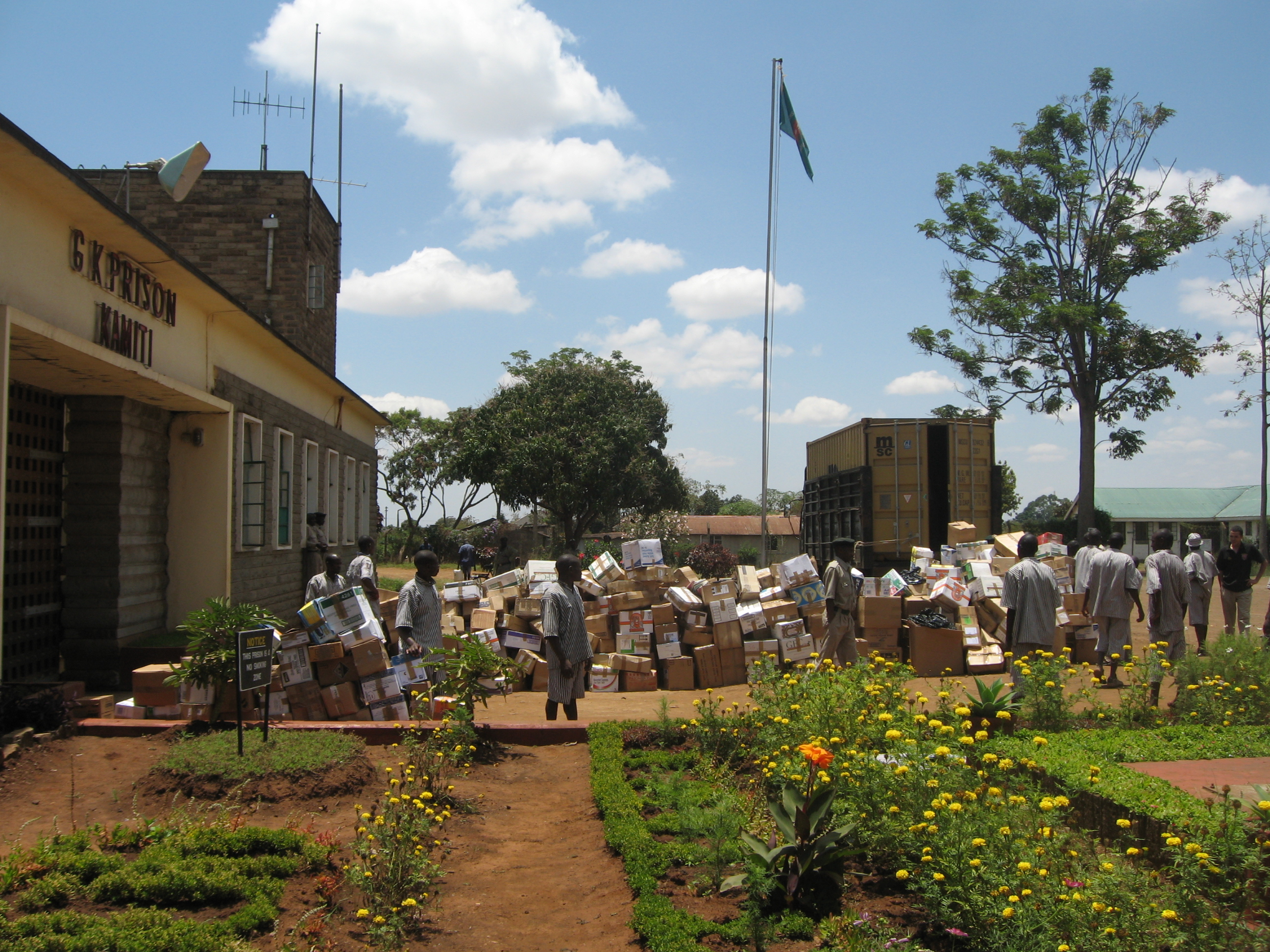
Donated books arriving at Kamiti Prison

In 2004, Alexander McLean was volunteering at the Mulago hospital in Kampala, Uganda, where he worked with a group of prisoners from Luzira Upper Prison. McLean observed that prison inmates were chained to their beds, with no opportunity for sanitation and no proper medical care. Despite being terminally ill, many patients were left unsupervised.

McLean visited the prison during his stay. He purchased materials to renovate the prison's infirmary, and with the support of the prison authorities, supervised the prisoners while they renovated their own infirmary. One of the questions McLean posed to the inmates was about their needs, to which he observed an expressed desire for education.

McLean returned to the UK where he fundraised and collected books to provide healthcare facilities to prisons in Uganda and to establish a library at Luzira Upper Prison, for the purpose of bringing education about the law to prison inmates. This event marked the beginning of Justice Defenders. Today, McLean is a member of the Tearfund Inspired Individuals Programme, along with Kelvin Mwikya.

== Projects ==
Justice Defenders is a UK charity and registered NGO with permanent bases in Kampala and Nairobi. The Justice Defenders community consists of local full-time staff members and a small group of permanent volunteers in the UK.

Education: In partnership with academic institutions, such as the University of London, Justice Defenders tutors and facilitates law degrees for prison communities. In recent University of London law exams, Justice Defenders students scored a 91% pass rate.

Training: Justice Defenders equips prisoners and prison staff to become auxiliary paralegals. It also provides professional development opportunities for prison officers, members of the judiciary, and allied professions. Through this UK secondment programme – in partnership with the Commonwealth Scholarship Commission – Justice Defenders selects prison staff and builds their capacity via training, networking, and leadership skills.

Practice: Justice Defenders establishes law practices within prisons, provides free services, and runs legal awareness clinics for prisoners. It equips prisoners to represent themselves and each other in court procedures.

== Awards ==
Justice Defenders and founder Alexander McLean have won several high-profile awards.

- In 2006, McLean was named the Charity Times Volunteer of the Year in the UK Charity Awards. The award was presented to McLean by Prince Edward, Earl of Wessex.
- In June 2007, McLean was named Alumnus of the Year by the University of Nottingham and the first Alumni Laureate at an alumni awards ceremony.
- In September 2007, McLean was awarded the Real World Graduate of the Year award.
- In November 2007, McLean was not only presented with the Beacon Prize for Young Philanthropists in recognition of his work, he was also named the Beacon Prize Overall winner. The honour came with a cheque for £30,000 for APP.
- In September 2008, Justice Defenders was a finalist in the "Best New Charity" category of the Charitytimes UK Charity Awards.
- In 2018, APP was a recipient of the Google Impact Challenge Award (Kenya).
- In 2020, McLean was given the 2020 Grinnell College Innovator for Social Justice Prize.
- Also in 2020, McLean was recognized as a Qatar Foundation WISE Award winner, which recognizes and promotes six innovative projects from across the world that address global educational challenges.
