= Sarah Leonard (archer) =

British archer (1862–1951)

Sarah Henrietta Leonard, mistakenly referred to in some sources as Everett "Eve" Leonard (21 March 1862 – 5 June 1951), was a British archer. She competed at the 1908 Summer Olympics in London. Leonard competed at the 1908 Games in the only archery event open to women, the double National round. She took 21st place in the event with 410 points.
