= Adrian Leppard =

British police officer

Commissioner Adrian Leppard CBE QPM
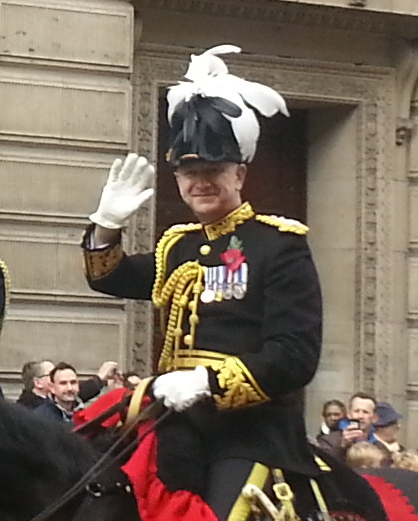
- Leppard at the Lord Mayor's Show in 2014
- Born: 11 February 1962 (age 64)
- Police career
- Country: England
- Department: Surrey Police; Kent Police; City of London Police
- Service years: 1984–2015
- Rank: Commissioner
- Awards: Queen's Police Medal (2012)

Adrian Allen Leppard (born 11 February 1962) is a retired senior British police officer and a former commissioner of the City of London Police. He was previously deputy chief constable of Kent Police and also served as a detective with Surrey Police.

== Early life and education ==
Leppard was born on 11 February 1962 in Surrey, England. In 2000, he graduated from City University London with a Master of Business Administration (MBA) degree. Starting in 2003, Leppard also earned a degree in Criminology at Fitzwilliam College, Cambridge.

== Police career ==
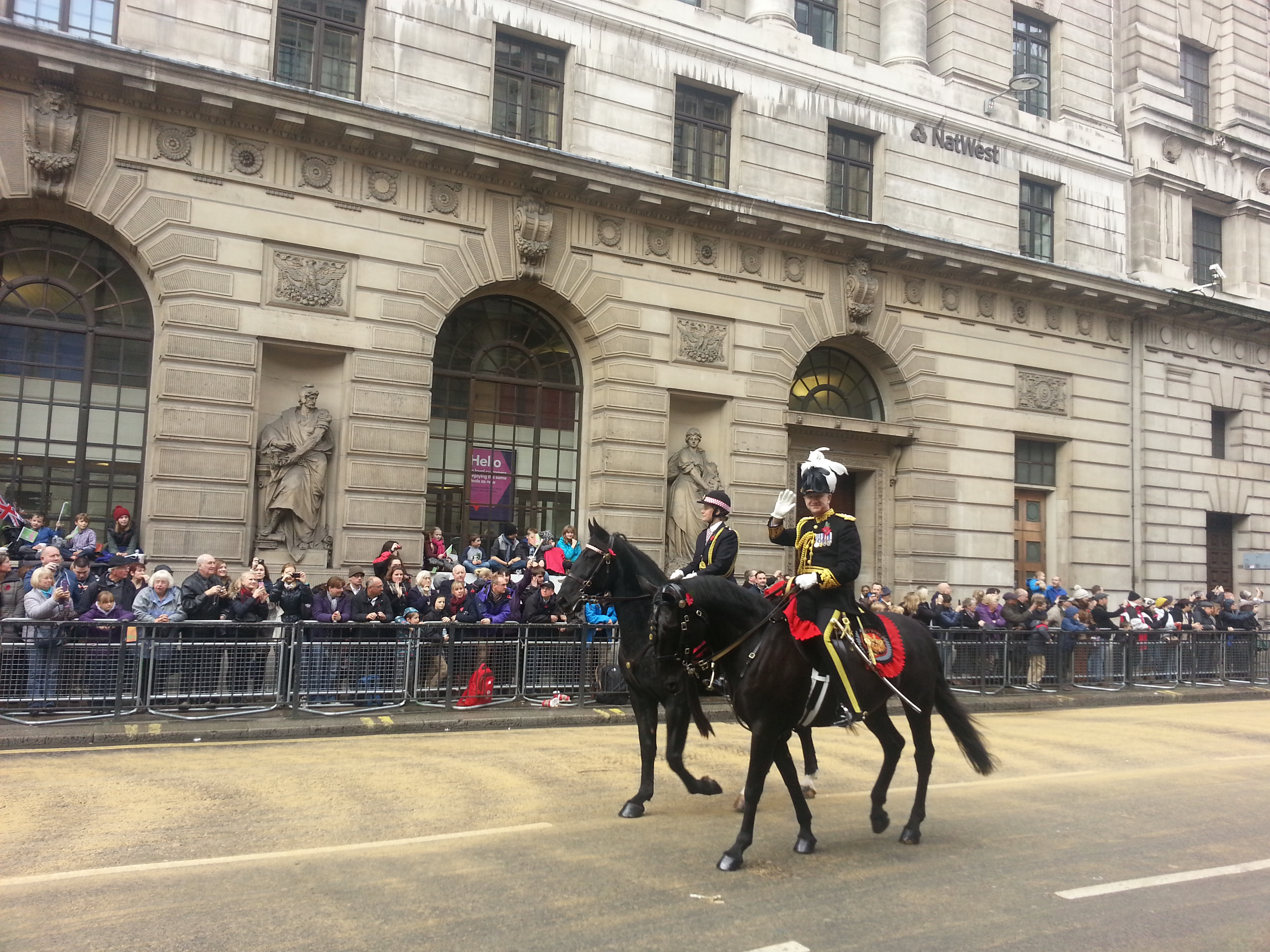
On mounted duty as Commissioner of the City of London Police at the Lord Mayor's Show, 2014.

Lepppard began his police in 1984 when he joined Surrey Police as a constable. He served as a traffic officer in the early years of his career. In 1989, he was promoted to sergeant and trained as a detective. As a senior investigating officer, he investigated a number of murders including the contract killing of Mario Commatteo. By 2003, he has risen to become the area commander of North West Surrey in the rank of chief superintendent.

In 2005, he transferred to Kent Police as an assistant chief constable with responsibly for specialist operations. In September 2005, he became assistant chief constable with responsibly for area operations. He led the investigation into the Securitas depot robbery that had occurred in February 2006. In December 2007, he was promoted to deputy chief constable. From March until July 2010, he was serving as temporary chief constable of the force.

In January 2011, he left Kent Police to join the City of London Police as commissioner. In addition to leading the City's police, he was head of the National Fraud Intelligence Bureau. In the 2012 New Year Honours, he was awarded the Queen's Police Medal. He retired on 31 December 2015 and was succeeded by the force's Assistant Commissioner, Ian Dyson, QPM.

Leppard is a member of the international advisory board of Black Cube, a private intelligence agency with offices in Tel Aviv, London and Madrid.

Leppard was appointed Commander of the Order of the British Empire (CBE) in the 2016 Birthday Honours for services to policing and the prevention of economic crime.

== Personal life ==
Leppard has raised at least $1 million for charity. In January 2013, he took part in the Wings of Kilimanjaro, a charity event that involved climbing Mount Kilimanjaro and paragliding off the top.

== Honours ==

Ribbon	Description	Notes
	Order of the British Empire (CBE)	Commander; Civil Division; 2016 Birthday Honours List
	Queen's Police Medal (QPM)	2012
	Queen Elizabeth II Golden Jubilee Medal	2002; UK version of this medal
	Queen Elizabeth II Diamond Jubilee Medal	2012; UK version of this medal
	Police Long Service and Good Conduct Medal	

Police appointments
Preceded by Mike Bowron	Commissioner of the City of London Police; 2011–2015	Succeeded by Ian Dyson
