= Queenie Newall =

British archer

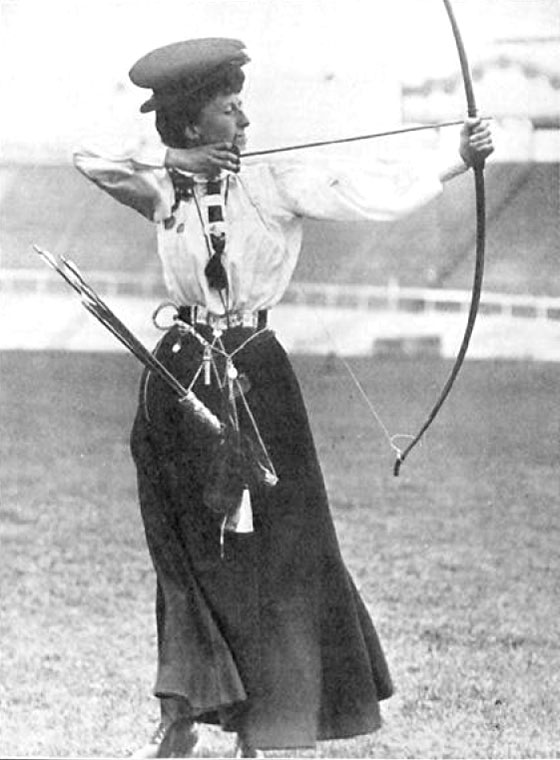
- Queenie Newall at the 1908 Summer Olympics

Personal information
- Full name: Sybil Fenton Newall
- Nickname: Queenie
- Nationality: English
- Citizenship: British
- Born: 17 October 1854 Hare Hill, Littleborough, Rochdale
- Died: 24 June 1929 (aged 74) Cheltenham, Gloucestershire

Sport
- Country: United Kingdom
- Sport: Archery
- Event: Women's double National
- Club: Cheltenham Archers
Medal record
Women's Archery
Representing Great Britain
Olympic Games
Gold medal – first place	1908 London	Double National round

Sybil Fenton Newall (17 October 1854 – 24 June 1929), best known as Queenie Newall, was an English archer who won the gold medal at the 1908 Summer Olympics in London. She was 53 years old at the time, still the oldest female gold medal winner at the Olympic Games. Great Britain did not win another women's archery medal at the Olympics until 2004. She joined the Cheltenham Archers Club in 1905 and was national champion twice in 1911 and 1912.

== Biography ==
Sybil "Queenie" Fenton Newall was born in Hare Hill House, Littleborough, Rochdale (part of her father's estate) on 17 October 1854. In 1905, along with her sister Margaret, she joined the local Cheltenham archery club. By 1907, she had won four of the five regional meetings.

She took part at the 1908 Summer Olympics, held in White City, London. The expected winner of the women's archery, Alice Legh, chose not to compete, and so Queenie's main rival was Lottie Dod who was a sporting all-rounder. The entire field competing in the women's archery was British.

On the first day of the Archery competition, the weather in White City Stadium was so poor that the event was stopped at one point. On the close of the first day, Queenie was behind Dod by ten points. The second day's weather was much improved, and Queenie overtook Dod, eventually winning with a score of 688 points, 46 points ahead of Dod, who finished in the silver medal position. The victory made Queenie the oldest woman to win an Olympic medal, at the age of 53 years and 275 days, a record which still stands as of 2012.

At the following National Championships, Newell was defeated by Alice Legh, but she went on to win it in 1911, retained it in 1912, and won it once more in 1914. She continued in the sport following the First World War, her last score was recorded by the Cheltenham archery club in 1928. She died at her home in Cheltenham on 24 June 1929.

After the 1908 Olympics, no female British archer won an Olympic medal until Alison Williamson won the bronze in the women's individual competition at the 2004 Summer Olympics.

== Personal life ==
Queenie was the eldest daughter of the ten children of Henry Newall and Maria Fenton. Her father was a merchant and owned Hare Hill House and estate in Littleborough, Lancashire. Her grandfather John Fenton was the Member of Parliament for Rochdale following the 1832 and 1837 general elections. Queenie never married and instead lived with her sister Margaret in Cheltenham all her life.
