= Kingston Grammar School =

Location
- London Rd; Kingston upon Thames, KT2 6PY; England; 51.4103°N 0.2965°W

Information
- Type: Private day school
- Motto: Bene Agere ac Lætari ("Work well and be happy")
- Established: c. 12th century 1561 (royal charter granted)
- Local authority: Kingston upon Thames
- Head Master: Stephen Lehec
- Gender: Coeducational
- Age: 11 to 18
- Enrolment: 1,006 (2024/25)
- Houses: Lovekyn; Queen's; Stanley; Taverner; Walworth; Hosking
- Colours: Red and Grey
- Publication: The Kingstonian
- Alumni: Old Kingstonians
- Website: www.kgs.org.uk

Kingston Grammar School is a private co-educational day school in Kingston upon Thames, England. The school was founded by royal charter in 1561 but can trace its roots back to at least the 13th century. It is a registered charity under English law. It was a boys' school from its foundation until 1978, when the first girls were admitted.

In 2025, the GCSE results recorded 91.6% of grades were A*/A or 9–7, and at A-level 75.4% of all grades were A or A*. In the 2026 edition of The Sunday Times School League Table it placed as the 30th highest ranking private school in the United Kingdom and 34th overall out of 4,180 schools. In 2008, the Good Schools Guide described the school as "An academic school with a modern edge".

== History ==
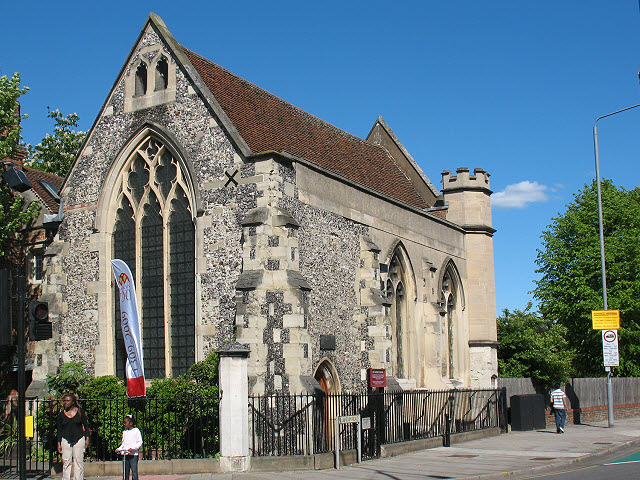
Lovekyn Chapel

The school's history is traceable into the Middle Ages, where there are references to schoolmasters Gilbert de Southwell in 1272, described as "Rector of the Schools in Kingston", and to Hugh de Kyngeston in 1364 "who presides over the Public School there". Notable in the school's history are the founding and endowing of the Lovekyn Chapel by Edward Lovekyn in 1309. Later endowments were made by his son John Lovekyn in 1352 and subsequently by William Walworth in 1371. The chapel is still used by the school.

After the dissolution of the chantries in 1547, the chapel fell to the Crown and was deconsecrated. It, and by now its substantial related endowments, fell to a court favourite, Richard Taverner. He preserved the chapel so when in 1561 the bailiffs of Kingston petitioned Queen Elizabeth I for a royal grammar school, the building was still usable. The Queen granted the school a royal charter in 1561. Until 1878, when new buildings were commissioned, the chapel was the school's teaching centre.

The school became a direct grant grammar school in 1946 as a result of the Education Act 1944 and became independent in 1978 after the scheme was abolished by the 1974–79 Labour Government. In the same year, the first girls were admitted.

KGS celebrated the four hundredth anniversary of its founding charter in 1961 with a visit from Queen Elizabeth II. In 2005, she opened the new Queen Elizabeth II Building, where she unveiled a plaque, met with students of Music and Geography and watched an excerpt of the play "Smike" after which the new Recording Studio was named.

On 1 May 1965, the school opened its new playing fields at Thames Ditton, alongside which was built its boathouse, donated by R.C Sherriff. Prior to this it had shared Kingston Rowing Club's boathouse, and had owned much smaller playing fields at Ditton Road, Kingston.

== Houses ==
There are six houses, mostly named after Medieval and Elizabethan figures connected with the school and the city of London, with the exception of Stanley Shoveller, an Old Kingstonian who played international hockey in the early 20th century, and Sophie Hosking, an Old Kingstonian who rowed for Great Britain in the 2000s and early 2010s.

House	Named after	Symbol	Colour(s)	Founded
Lovekyn	John and Edward Lovekyn, benefactors	Eagle		1914
Queen's	Queen Elizabeth I	Crown		1914
Walworth	William Walworth, former Lord Mayor of London	Tiger		1914
Taverner	Richard Taverner, Bible translator	Bear		1921
Stanley	Stanley Shoveller, Old Kingstonian and Olympic hockey gold medalist	Stag		2016
Hosking	Sophie Hosking, Old Kingstonian and Olympic rowing gold medalist	Laurel Wreath		2024

== Extracurricular activities ==
The school has a sporting programme, with the main sports being football, netball, tennis, hockey, rowing and cricket.

The 'R.C. Sherriff' rowing boathouse is on the Thames at Thames Ditton, Surrey. Students may take up rowing beginning in Third Form (Year 9) and represent the boat club in local and national regattas, including The National Schools Regatta and Henley Royal Regatta.

== Notable alumni ==
- Alexander McLean — activist, humanitarian, and lawyer, founder of Justice Defenders which seeks to improve the lives of people imprisoned in Africa.
- Christopher Bryan — international football player, Turks and Caicos
- Paul Butler — Bishop of Durham
- William Gilbert Chaloner — paleobiologist, Royal Holloway
- Richard Cheetham — Bishop of Kingston upon Thames
- James Cracknell — 2000 and 2004 Olympic rowing gold medallist, adventurer
- Philip Crosland — journalist
- Kerem Hasan — classical musician, conductor, former Chief Conductor of the Tiroler Symphonieorchester Innsbruck in Austria
- Richard Dodds — International hockey player: Captain of the Great Britain Olympic 1988 gold medal hockey team
- Ian Dyson — Commissioner of the City of London Police
- Michael Edwards — poet & academic, first Briton elected to the Académie Française
- Brett Garrard — international hockey player
- Sarah Evans — international hockey player
- Neil Fox — DJ and television presenter
- Michael Frayn — playwright and novelist
- Edward Gibbon — author, The History of the Decline and Fall of the Roman Empire
- Air Marshal Sir Gerald Gibbs — RAF officer
- Tanya Gold — The Guardian journalist
- Sophie Hosking — 2012 Olympic Rowing gold medallist
- Jonathan Kenworthy — sculptor
- Francis Maseres — lawyer, mathematician, Attorney-General of Quebec
- Leif Mills — author and former trade unionist
- Neil Mullarkey — actor, writer and comedian
- Jonathon Riley — Director General and Master of the Armouries
- R. C. Sherriff — playwright, who donated five rowing eights (named after his plays: "Journey's End", "White Carnation", "Home at Seven", "Long Sunset" and "Badger's Green") to the school boat club in the 1960s and 1970s
- John Spiers — entrepreneur
- Sir Denis Spotswood — Chief of the Air Staff, 1971-1974
- Howard Stoate — formerly MP for Dartford
- Zachary Wallace — international hockey player

== See also ==
- List of the oldest schools in the United Kingdom

== Sources ==
- Ward, The Rev David; Evans, Gordon W. (2000). Chantry Chapel to Royal Grammar School: the History of Kingston Grammar School 1299–1999. Gresham Books. ISBN 978-0946095360
