= Alan Saunders =

Alan Saunders may refer to:

- Alan Saunders (musician) (active 1960s–1970s), member of the Australian country music band the Country Outcasts
- Alan Saunders (police officer) (1886–1964), Inspector-General of Police in Palestine, 1937–1943
- Alan Saunders (public servant) (1892–1957), English public servant and cricketer
- Alan Saunders (broadcaster) (1954–2012), broadcaster for the Australian Broadcasting Corporation

== See also ==
- Allen Saunders (1899–1986), American writer, journalist and cartoonist
