= Arthur Young (police officer) =

British police officer

Colonel Sir Arthur Young KBE CMG CVO OStJ KPM
- Sir Arthur Young, 1966 photograph
- Born: Arthur Edwin Young; 15 February 1907; Eastleigh, Hampshire, England
- Died: 20 January 1979 (aged 71); St Thomas' Hospital, London, England
- Occupation: police officer

Colonel Sir Arthur Edwin Young (15 February 1907 – 20 January 1979) was a British police officer. He was Commissioner of Police of the City of London from 1950 to 1971 and was also the first head of the Royal Ulster Constabulary to be styled Chief Constable. Young was instrumental in the creation of the post of Chief Inspector of Constabulary.

In the early 1950s, Young played a key role in the decolonisation of policing in the British Empire. His exit from Kenya at the end of 1954 became a political scandal and cause célèbre. During the 1960s, he led the way in modernising British police recruitment and in improving the training of senior officers.

Clive Emsley commented:

Young shared the heroic vision of the British Bobby and was always focussed on the idea that police officers should enjoy good, even friendly relations with the people that they served.

Young gained a reputation as the "policeman's policeman", associated with his concerns for the conditions of work of serving police officers. He liked to use it of himself.

== Early life and education ==
Young was born at 55 Chamberlayne Road, Eastleigh, Hampshire, one of four children of Edwin Young (1878–1936), a builder and contractor, and his wife Gertrude Mary (née Brown; 1880–1945). He attended Mayville Preparatory School, Southsea from 1912 to 1915 and then Portsmouth Grammar School from 1915 to 1924.

Aged sixteen, Young left school to join the Portsmouth Borough Police, against his family's wishes.

== Early police career ==
=== Portsmouth Police ===
Young's father's business partner John Henry Corke secured him an initial placement in the office of Chief Constable Thomas Davies in December 1924. Young had the post of cadet clerk. On the advice of the chief constable, he first took a course in business and accountancy.

Appointed a constable in May 1925, he became the coroner's officer in April 1932. In June 1932, aged 25, he became the youngest detective sergeant in the United Kingdom, serving with the Northern Division CID. During his time there, he led investigations into murder, blackmail, fraud and arson. He headed the enquiries into the UK's first case of manslaughter arising from the use of an aeroplane. Simultaneously, he began to take an ever more prominent involvement in the many royal visits to Portsmouth; when Haile Selassie visited the dockyard in September 1937, he acted as his personal escort and French interpreter. During these years, Young was also entrusted with what he later cryptically termed "enquiries concerning the activities of subversive persons and propaganda, and also with other matters affecting state security". It was also during these years that he acquired his passion for ever better police equipment and his personal love of new gadgets.

Young was promoted to inspector in June 1937 and appointed to Portsmouth's Southern Division. In Eastney and Southsea, he gained his first taste of the complexity of the problems created by traffic, of measures to be taken for its efficient control and of the need to promote road safety. A keen motorist (who progressed from a motorcycle to a series of fast cars), he took a pragmatic approach.

=== Leamington Spa Borough Police ===
Young wanted to head his own force. After one unsuccessful attempt, for the chief constableship of the Isle of Wight Constabulary, he became acting chief constable of Leamington Spa Borough Police in September 1938, aged 31, at a salary of £500 per annum. One year later, he was appointed to the permanent post of chief constable. In his first nine months in post, he secured an increase of twelve in the force's establishment of 45. He also reorganised the borough's fire brigade.

Among other innovations, Young set up twelve of the then new "police pillars". They were a network of two-way microphone handsets across the borough, enabling the public to contact police stations and civil defence posts directly. The base of the pillar contained first aid equipment while, a Leamington innovation, a flashing red light on the top called up policemen on patrol.

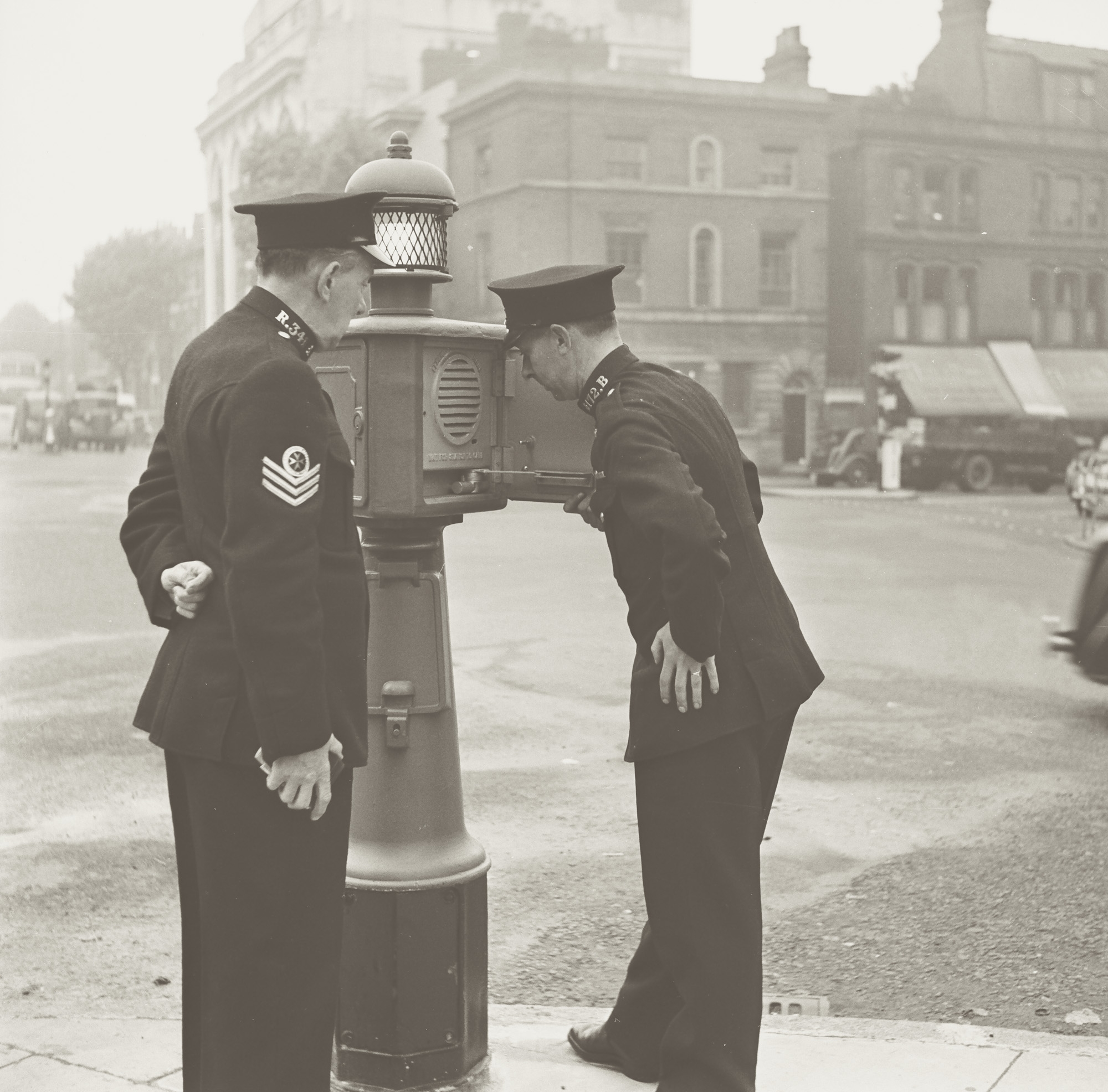
Police pillar with West Midlands Police officers, c.1950

After the Coventry Blitz of November 1940, Young was seconded by the Home Office for six months to run the Coventry City Police, the chief constable being fully occupied as civil defence controller. He introduced there a "good neighbour scheme" for civilians who had been bombed out that he had previously set up in Leamington.

=== Birmingham City Police ===
Young made several unsuccessful applications for promotion: the East Riding of Yorkshire Constabulary in 1939, Portsmouth City Police in 1940, Oxford City Police in 1940). In 1941 he was selected as senior assistant chief constable of Birmingham City Police. The chief constable (1941–45) was William Clarence Johnson.

It was in Birmingham that Young began with police training. He also established in 1942 a radio telephone system linking police stations and police cars.

== Wartime service ==
In February 1943, Young was one of a number of chief constables seconded to the War Office's Civil Affairs Training Centre and attended the first course for senior officers. Before the course was finished, he was transferred to the instructing staff and in June 1943 he was appointed the first commandant of the new Police Civil Affairs Training Centre at Peel House in London (gazetted with the rank of lieutenant-colonel) and charged with the task of setting up the training school for policemen and provost officers. Their duties would be to maintain law and order in Axis territory as it was liberated by Allied forces.

Shortly afterwards, Young was promoted colonel, and moved in July 1943 to be senior British police officer in the Mediterranean Theatre. He was stationed in North Africa awaiting the Allied invasion of Sicily. After the invasion, he worked in the Allied Control Commission for Italy. In December 1943 he was given the role of director of the security branch of the Allied Military Government of Occupied Territories. His post with the Control Commission in Italy lasted to 1945. The approaches Young developed in Italy were adapted elsewhere Allied occupied Europe in 1944–1945. He considered his major personal achievement was reorganising the Carabinieri.

== Post-war police service ==
Young was appointed Chief Constable of Hertfordshire Constabulary in 1944; but he was not demobilised until 1945. He emphasised pay and conditions for his officers. In 1946 he wrote

"I hold the view that the police organisation is not a police force but a police service, which offers to the right individual not merely a job but all the advantages of a professional career. I believe in doing everything reasonably possible by way of improving the conditions and amenities for all ranks of the service, and in particular in delegating both authority and responsibility to officers according to their rank. Having done this I am prepared to accept nothing but the highest standard of service by way of return."

He was appointed by the Home Office to a committee chaired by Sir Percy Sillitoe to consider the wireless needs of all forces. At this period he became re-acquainted with the politician James Callaghan, from Portsmouth, now a junior minister at the Ministry of Transport.

Young applied unsuccessfully to be chief constable of Kent in 1946. Through Home Secretary James Chuter Ede he was appointed in 1947 Assistant Commissioner "D" of the Metropolitan Police in London, in charge of organisation, recruitment, training and communications. Things, however, did not go well, since colleagues shunned him. Then Young was the first former police constable to be appointed Commissioner of Police of the City of London, in March 1950. He held the post to 1971.

== Colonial police reforms of the 1950s ==
In 1948, W. C. Johnson, Young's old chief from Birmingham, was appointed to the Colonial Office, as police advisor to the Colonial secretary. From 1949, he was Inspector-General of Colonial Police. He left that position in 1951 and was succeeded by his assistant George Abbiss. The post was an innovation, created with as its motivations both Cold War fear of communist influence, and the wish (clearly signalled and raising concern in colonial forces) to bring colonial policing into line with British practice.

Young was sent on colonial missions for police reform. First came a short period in the Gold Coast. The Convention People's Party was arousing police interest, ahead of the 1951 Gold Coast general election. Young was there in 1950, for two months, with Chief Superintendent Wilson of the Metropolitan Police, and wrote a substantial report for Matthew Collens, the inspector-general of police.

=== Malaya ===
In 1952–1953, Young was seconded to the Federation of Malaya as its commissioner of police, during the Emergency. He arrived in February 1952, bringing again Chief Superintendent Wilson who was to train uniformed police. In broad terms Gerald Templer and Young conformed to the "Briggs Plan", proposed by Harold Rawdon Briggs, for resettling rural Chinese-Malayans. Success was obtained from 1952 onwards in limiting the insurgency. Young chose his successor, William Carbonell, without regard to seniority.

=== Kenya ===
In 1954, Young undertook a further secondment, in Kenya as commissioner of police during the Mau Mau rebellion. He followed the parliamentary delegation that went to Kenya in January 1954, led by Walter Elliot and Arthur Bottomley, and reported some months later. Oliver Lyttleton, the Colonial Secretary, visited Kenya three times in the period 1952–4, before resigning from the third Churchill ministry in July 1954. Young arrived in Kenya in March of that year, and immediately required that policing should be carried out with minimal physical force.

Young appointed Duncan MacPherson (1912–1989) from the Royal Hong Kong Police Force as head of CID, to investigate allegations against the army, police and Kikuyu Home Guard. From 1951 CID had been under John Timmerman, a Canadian RCMP and WWII intelligence officer who was assistant police commissioner, brought in to reorganise it, and who from 1955 worked for the Department of External Affairs in security. The trial on 10 December 1954 for perjury of George Horsfall of the Kenya Police, and Derek Searle of the Reserve, was met by demands for an inquiry from Reserve officers into CID methods.

Young resigned after less than eight months. He saw widespread interference of the executive in policing. His resignation letter to Evelyn Baring was suppressed. His replacement was Richard Catling, a sceptic when it came to George Erskine's policy on detention of Kikuyu. He had arrived from Malaya in April as a deputy commissioner and police trainer. John Whyatt, Attorney-General of Kenya and an ally of Young, was made Chief Justice of Singapore in 1955.

Before leaving Kenya, Young asked MacPherson to compile a concise file of issues with Baring's administration: it was not circulated, but Young used his Anglican contacts to make the content known. Karl Hack reports Young's resignation as driven by the failure to have murders by the Kikuyu Home Guard investigated. He comments also on the differences between Malaya and Kenya, stating that in Young's view efforts to make policing "friendly to the public" initially had failed in the latter, having largely succeeded in the former.

On his return to the United Kingdom, Young met privately with the clerical activist Michael Scott and the politician Barbara Castle. He made no move to publicise his views. The Christian Council of Kenya was split, with David Steel moved by Young's departure, coupled with a raid on Mombasa's YMCA, to preach strongly against Baring's administration in St Andrew's Church, Nairobi; while Leonard Beecher opposed him. Steel brought the Church Missionary Society (CMS) into his camp. On 22 December 1954, Lord Ogmore asked in the House of Lords if the government would make a statement on Young's resignation. Behind the scenes, while talking to the Colonial Office about a non-disclosure agreement, Young briefed against Baring to Kenneth George Grubb of the CMS, and encouraged the CMS missionary Thomas Francis Cecil Bewes to keep up the pressure. Grubb wrote a letter to The Times, published 22 January 1955. Geoffrey Fisher, the Archbishop of Canterbury, met Baring during December 1954, but Beecher asked him to leave matters to the churches in Kenya. He was in discussions with Frederick Crawford, acting Governor, and considered church leaders bound by undertakings of confidentiality.

In the House of Lords on 10 February 1955, William Jowitt, 1st Earl Jowitt cited a Times report of the East African Court of Appeal, in which it was stated that the authority of detention teams could not be fathomed in law. He said "It is in that context that I find disquieting the sending out of Colonel Young to investigate the affairs of the police and his coming back for some reason which I do not fully understand." Bottomley challenged the Colonial Secretary, by then Alan Lennox-Boyd, on 16 March 1955 in a House of Commons debate on colonial affairs, stating that "there has been no satisfactory explanation yet of the resignation of Colonel Young". In a 1959 debate on the Hola massacre, Castle accused Lennox-Boyd of repeated cover-ups, and suppression of reports including Young's. She also quoted from MacPherson, who had remained in Kenya for two years after Young had left. He had been told by Young's successor as commissioner of police to stop investigations into camp deaths.

== Royal Ulster Constabulary ==
In November 1969 Young was seconded to be the last inspector-general and the first chief constable of the Royal Ulster Constabulary. James Callaghan, then Home Secretary, sent him to implement the Hunt Report. Young's measures introduced the standard British rank system for police officers in Northern Ireland and disbanded the Ulster Special Constabulary. In his tenure to 1970, he gained the approval of nationalists. Georgina Sinclair has argued that he was overly influenced by arguments put to him by constitutional Irish nationalists.

== Views and other positions ==
Improved pay and conditions and professional standards were Young's constant pre-occupations. Uniforms were made more comfortable and practical. At national level, he ran command courses and saw through a fast-track entry scheme to attract graduates.

Young fought for the recruitment and promotion of women. He resisted the traditional placement of military officers into police commands; and opposed Lord Trenchard's approach in his 1932 Commissioner's Report, base on "promoting from within wasn't working", as inappropriate for the British police service. He ran an adroit campaign from 1960 on the police inspectorate, aimed at the Royal Commission on the Police. It dealt with opposition to innovation. Sir Charles Cunningham then blocked Young's selection as the first Chief Inspector of Constabulary.

Young chaired the Police Council for the UK, the Association of Chief Police Officers training centres committee and the education committee of the National Police Fund. He was a governor of the Police College and of Atlantic College, and a member of the committees of the Police Advisory Board, the National Police Fund, the Royal Humane Society, the National Rifle Association, the National Scout Council, and the Thames Group Hospitals. He was president of the Association of Chief Police Officers (ACPO) in 1962.

== Family ==
Young married three times.

1. In 1939, he married Ivy Ada May Hammond (1909–1956), a nurse; they had a son. She had trained at the Royal Portsmouth Hospital, meeting Young there when he was a police constable.
2. In 1957, he married Margaret Furnival Homan, née Dolphin (died 1966).
3. In 1970, he married Ileen Fryer Turner (née Rayner). She died on 31 December 2002.

== Death ==
Young died at St Thomas's Hospital, London, on 20 January 1979. After cremation, his ashes were scattered at Beachy Head.

== Awards and honours ==
Young was awarded the King's Police Medal (KPM) in the 1952 New Year Honours. The following year, he was appointed Companion of the Order of St Michael and St George (CMG) in the 1953 Coronation Honours "for services as Commissioner of Police, Federation of Malaya" and was further appointed Commander of the Royal Victorian Order (CVO) in the 1962 Birthday Honours. He was knighted in the 1965 Birthday Honours, and was formally conferred with his knighthood by the Queen at Buckingham Palace on 16 November of that year. For his work in Northern Ireland he was appointed Knight Commander of the Order of the British Empire (KBE) in the 1971 New Year Honours.

=== British ===
- 1937 King George VI Coronation Medal
- 1939-45 1939-1945 Star
- 1939-45 Italy Star
- 1939-45 Defence Medal
- 1939-45 War Medal
- 1951 Officer of the Order of St John (OStJ)
- 1952 King's Police Medal for Distinguished Service (KPM) - 1952 New Years Honours List.
- 1953 General Service Medal (bar for Malaya)
- 1953 Companion of the Order of St Michael and St George (CMG) - 1953 Coronation Honours List.
- 1953 Queen Elizabeth II Coronation Medal
- 1954 Africa General Service Medal (bar for Kenya & oak palm for mention in despatches)
- 1962 Commander of the Royal Victorian Order (CVO) - 1962 Queen's Birthday Honours List.
- 1965 Knight Bachelor - 1965 Queen's Birthday Honours List.
- 1971 Knight Commander of the Order of the British Empire (Civil Division) (KBE) - 1971 New Years Honours List.
- Police Long Service and Good Conduct Medal

=== Foreign ===
- Argentina: Commander, Order of Merit
- Austria: Commander, Honour Badge for Merit of the Republic (Silbernes Ehrenzeichen)
- Belgium: Commander, Order of the Crown.
- Cameroons: Officer, Order of Valour
- Chile: Commander, Order of Merit
- Denmark: Commander, Order of the Dannebrog.
- Finland: Commander, Order of the White Rose; Commander, Order of the Lion.
- France: Medal of the Sûreté Nationale
  - French colonial: Commander, Order of the Black Star of Benin
- Germany: Commander, Order of Merit of the Federal Republic.
- Greece: Commander, Royal Order of the Phoenix.
- Iceland: Knight Commander, Order of the Falcon
- Iran: Officer, Order of the Lion and the Sun
- Iraq: Grand Officer, Order of the Two Rivers (Military Division).
- Italy: Grand Officer, Order of Merit of the Italian Republic
- Ivory Coast: Commander of the National Order of the Ivory Coast
- Japan: Order of the Sacred Treasure, Third Class.
- Jordan: Commander, Order of the Star of Jordan
- Liberia: Knight Commander, Humane Order of African Redemption.
- Malaysia: Pingat Khidmat Berbakti (General Service Medal)
- Nepal: Member 3rd Class, Order of Tri Shakti Patta
- Netherlands: Commander, Order of Orange-Nassau.
- Niger: Commander, National Order of Merit
- Peru: Commander, Distinguished Service Order
- Portugal: Grand Officer, Military Order of Christ
- Senegal: Commander, National Order of Merit
- Sudan: Commander, Order of the Two Niles
- Thailand: Commander, Order of the Crown.
- Tunisia: Commander, Order of the Republic
- Sweden: King Gustaf VI Adolf's Gold Merit Medal

Police appointments
Preceded by John Hanlon	Chief Constable of Leamington Spa; 1938–1941	Succeeded by Charles Martin
Preceded by Unknown	Senior Assistant Chief Constable of Birmingham; 1941–1943	Succeeded by Edward Dodd
Preceded by Abel Camp (acting)	Chief Constable of Hertfordshire; 1945–1947	Succeeded by Albert Wilcox
Preceded by Philip Margetson	Assistant Commissioner "D", Metropolitan Police; 1947–1950	Succeeded by John Rymer-Jones
Preceded by Sir Hugh Turnbull	Commissioner of the City of London Police; 1950–1971	Succeeded by James Page
Preceded by Anthony Peacock; Inspector-General	Chief Constable of the Royal Ulster Constabulary; 1969–1970	Succeeded by Graham Shillington
