= John Rymer-Jones =

British Army and police officer (1897-1993)

Brigadier John Rymer-Jones CBE MC & Bar QPM
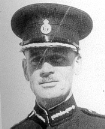
- John Rymer-Jones, 1943
- Born: 12 July 1897; Blackheath, London
- Died: 17 December 1993 (aged 96)
- Military career
- Allegiance: United Kingdom
- Branch: British Army
- Service years: 1916–34
- Rank: Brigadier
- Conflicts: World War I: Western Front; Palestine Emergency
- Awards: Commander of the Order of the British Empire; Military Cross & bar Queen's Police Medal
- Other work: Police officer and administrator

Brigadier John Murray Rymer-Jones CBE MC & Bar QPM (12 July 1897 – 17 December 1993) was a British Army and police officer.

== Early life ==
Rymer-Jones was born in Blackheath, London, and educated at Felsted School and the Royal Military Academy, Woolwich.

== Military career ==
Commissioned into the Royal Field Artillery in 1916, Rymer-Jones served in France and Flanders during the First World War, winning the Military Cross (MC) in 1917 and a bar in 1918, while serving with the 74th Field Brigade. The citation for his first MC reads:

"For conspicuous gallantry and devotion to duty. He went forward with the first wave of the infantry in an attack to the final objective, establishing signal stations at each objective as he went forward. He sent in early information as to the capture of the objectives and other valuable reports. He kept his lines working, continually going about repairing them under heavy fire, and sent in timely information of an enemy concentration for a counter-attack. He showed ceaseless energy and determination."

Rymer-Jones was promoted lieutenant in August 1917 and became an acting captain while serving as brigade adjutant from September 1918 until July 1919. In 1919 he served with the British Army of the Rhine and in 1920–1921 was in Ireland attached to the King's Own Royal Regiment. In 1921 he briefly served in Upper Silesia during the plebiscite and then went to Egypt as a staff officer until 1925. From 1927 to 1928 he served as a staff officer with the Shanghai Defence Force and his last years in the Army, from 1929 to 1933, were spent as a company commander at the Royal Military Academy. He was promoted captain in February 1929.

== Police career ==
Following his retirement in February 1934 he joined the Metropolitan Police as a chief inspector and was posted to the headquarters of No.3 District in Hackney. He was promoted superintendent in May 1935 and took over the Croydon Division. In August 1936, he was transferred to the Organisation Department of the Commissioner's Office at Scotland Yard and in October 1936 was promoted chief constable. He was appointed Officer of the Order of the British Empire (OBE) in the 1943 New Year Honours.

In 1943, Rymer-Jones was posted to Palestine as Inspector-General of the Palestine Police, with the Army rank of brigadier. In 1946, he returned to the Metropolitan Police with the new rank of commander, taking over No.1 District (West End). He was appointed Commander of the Order of the British Empire (CBE) in the 1950 New Year Honours. In April 1950, he was appointed Assistant Commissioner "D" (Personnel and Training). He held this position until his retirement in August 1959. During this time he was a vocal advocate of police dogs and increased their use within the Metropolitan Police. He was awarded the Queen's Police Medal (QPM) in the 1959 Birthday Honours, two months before his retirement.

== Later life ==
Rymer-Jones was also North Kent area commissioner of St John Ambulance from 1963 to 1966, secretary of the Drinking Fountain Association from 1959 to 1976, and on the committee of the Royal Humane Society from 1957 to 1977.

== Footnotes ==
Police appointments
Preceded by First incumbent	Chief Constable (Organisation), Metropolitan Police; 1936–1943	Succeeded by Unknown
Preceded by Alan Saunders	Inspector-General of the Palestine Police; 1943–1946	Succeeded by Nicol Gray
Preceded by Unknown	Commander, No.1 District, Metropolitan Police; 1946–1950	Succeeded by Unknown
Preceded by Arthur Young	Assistant Commissioner "D", Metropolitan Police; 1950–1959	Succeeded by Tom Mahir
