= Trans-Jordan Frontier Force Long Service and Good Conduct Medal =

- Ribbon bar of the medal
- Awarded for: Long service and good conduct
- Description: Circular silver medal
- Presented by: the United Kingdom
- Eligibility: Other ranks of the Trans-Jordan Frontier Force
- Status: No longer awarded
- Established: 1938
- Final award: 1948

Highlights
- Total: 112

Order of Wear
- Next (higher): Royal Naval Wireless Auxiliary Reserve Long Service and Good Conduct Medal
- Next (lower): Union of South Africa Commemoration Medal

The Trans-Jordan Frontier Force Long Service and Good Conduct Medal was an official United Kingdom award relating to the Emirate of Transjordan, which was a British protectorate.

The Trans-Jordan Frontier Force (TJFF) was formed in April 1926, with the principal role of defending Trans-Jordan's northern and southern borders. It included cavalry, infantry, camel and mechanised troops with, before the Second World War, a strength of nearly 1,000 men.

The long service medal was established in May 1938 by the High Commissioner for Trans-Jordan. It rewarded NCOs and men of the Trans-Jordan Frontier Force who had completed 16 years exemplary service. Earlier service in the Palestine Gendarmerie or the Trans-Jordan Arab Legion could count, provided the soldier transferred to the TJFF without a break in service. There was no provision for ribbon clasps to mark further service.

The medal is silver, circular, and 36mm in diameter. The obverse bears the effigy of King George VI with, around the perimeter, the legend 'GEORGIVS VI D:G:BR:OMN:REX ET INDIAE IMP:' The reverse is inscribed 'FOR LONG SERVICE AND GOOD CONDUCT' over four lines with, around the circumference, the words 'TRANS-JORDAN FRONTIER FORCE'. The medal was awarded with the name and details of the recipient inscribed on its edge.
The 32mm wide ribbon is crimson with a central green stripe, the same as for the West African Frontier Force and King's African Rifles Long Service and Good Conduct Medals. It was worn in uniform immediately after other long service medals.

A total of 112 medals were awarded, with each announced in the Palestine Gazette. Awards were discontinued in February 1948 when the TJFF was disbanded.

== See also ==
- Trans-Jordan Frontier Force
- Emirate of Transjordan
