= Tom Mahir =

Thomas Edward Mahir CBE GM (1 March 1915 – 29 January 1970) was a British police officer in the London Metropolitan Police.

Mahir was the son of the Reverend Edward Mahir and his wife Dorothy. He was educated at Crewkerne School in Somerset and taught at St Aubyn's Preparatory School in Tiverton, Devon, from 1932 to 1935, when he entered Hendon Police College as a direct entrant. He passed out in 1936, was confirmed as a Junior Station Inspector in 1937 and served in "G" and "H" Divisions in the East End of London. He was promoted Station Inspector in 1939.

In April 1941, Mahir was awarded the George Medal (GM) for his bravery following an air raid. His citation reads:

When a bomb demolished two houses, the roof and chimney stack of one house fell across the ruins of the other and the whole formed a heap of wreckage about fifteen feet high. Station Inspector Mahir and Junior Station Inspector Gott tore away debris and found a hole down which Mahir crawled. A man, buried up to the chin, was pinned down by a rafter, in a cavity about seven feet deep and two feet wide. Gott had the mouth of the hole widened and then crawled down to joint Mahir. They reached the man who informed them that a friend was below him and Mahir crawled out to investigate while Gott took on his shoulders the weight of the debris above the man's head. At this point P.S. [Police Sergeant] Sneddon arrived from another incident and Mahir showed him where the other man was thought to be whilst he himself returned to relieve Gott. Sneddon sent his men to collect buckets from nearby houses to carry away the rubble and organised their work so well that the man was soon released. A lot of rubble had fallen and the strain on the two Inspectors was greatly increased. The whole of the pile was nearly brought down on to the three men when those outside tried to dig through to them. Mahir and Gott used the broken rafter to shore up the cavity and sawed through a bedstead and a sofa, eventually releasing the victim who was only slightly injured. Mahir, Gott and Sneddon were, throughout, subject to the risk of being crushed by shifting rubble and in danger from leaking gas. At one time water from the burst main in the crater outside threatened to overflow into the hole in which the two Inspectors were working. The Inspectors showed resourcefulness, courage and determination and were ably supported by P.S. Sneddon.

Mahir was promoted Sub-Divisional Inspector in 1944, Chief Inspector in 1949, Superintendent in 1950, and Chief Superintendent in 1954. In 1955 he was seconded as Deputy Commandant of the National Police College at Ryton-on-Dunsmore, Warwickshire, a post in which he served until 1957. He was promoted Deputy Commander in 1956 and Commander in 1958, and in August 1959 was appointed Assistant Commissioner "D" (Personnel and Training). In this post he set up the Metropolitan Police Cadet Corps. He retired in 1967 and spent the rest of his life in Hove, Sussex.

Mahir was appointed Commander of the Order of the British Empire (CBE) in the 1965 New Year Honours. He married Dione Finnis in 1938; they had no children. He was an enthusiastic sportsman, playing football for Exeter City, Corinthians and the Metropolitan Police and also cricket for the Metropolitan Police (and was once a member of a British Empire XI). He also represented the Metropolitan Police at billiards and snooker and was a referee and judge for the Amateur Boxing Association.

== Footnotes ==
Police appointments
Preceded by Unknown	Deputy Commandant of the National Police College; 1955–1957	Succeeded by Thomas Lockley
Preceded by John Rymer-Jones	Assistant Commissioner "D", Metropolitan Police; 1959–1967	Succeeded by Robert Mark
