= Transjordan Frontier Force =

Military unit (1926–1948)

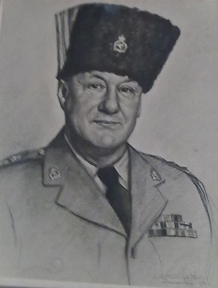
Lt.Col. G.T. Paley, OBE, DCM

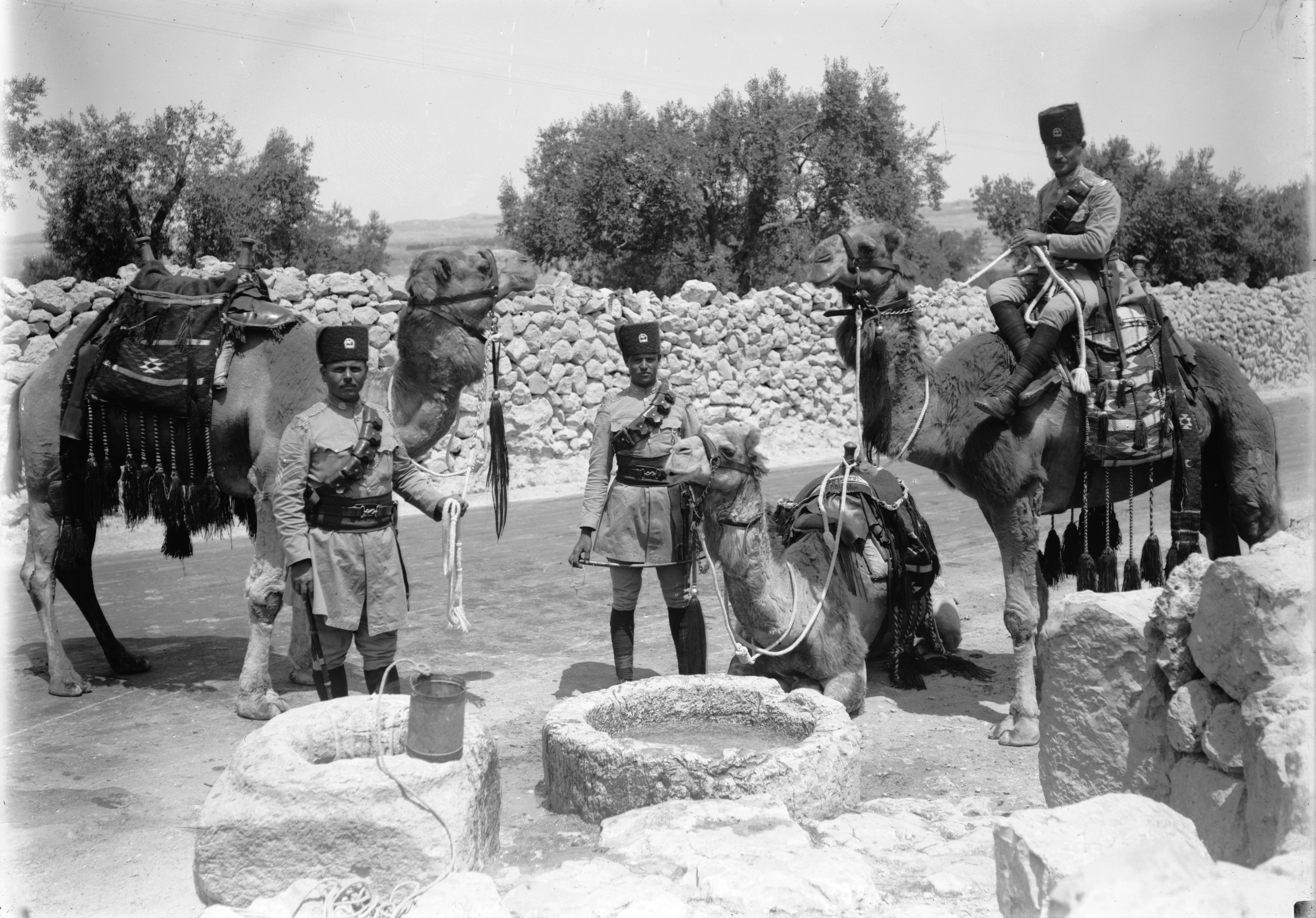
Trans Jordan Frontier Force patrol. Photo taken in 1934–1939

The Trans-Jordan Frontier Force was formed on 1 April 1926, to replace the disbanded British Gendarmerie. It was a creation of the British High Commissioner for Palestine whose intention was that the Force should defend Trans-Jordan's northern and southern borders. The TJFF was also an Imperial Service regiment whose Imperial Service soldiers agreed to serve wherever required and not just within the borders of their own colony, protectorate or, in the case of the Transjordan, mandate. This was in contrast to the Arab Legion, which was seen more as an internal security militia, deriving from the troops of the Arab Revolt and closely associated with the Hashemite cause. The Amir Abdullah was an Honorary Colonel of the Trans-Jordan Frontier Force from its inception. However, the local commanders thought it unnecessary to form an additional force, believing that the expansion of The Arab Legion would be a better action.

== History ==
The Transjordan Frontier Force (TJFF) was established at Sarafand on 1 April 1926 with a cadre drawn from the Arab Legion and quickly grew to three cavalry squadrons, each of 120 men each, and an infantry unit. Its first commander was Lieutenant-Colonel Frederick William Bewsher. Other units, such as a camel squadron and mechanised units, were subsequently added.

The TJFF would be equipped in a conventional manner, with modern weapons, whilst the Arab Legion would, initially, remain a traditional force, looser in structure and without training in technology. Accordingly, the Arab Legion transferred its inventory of machine guns, artillery, and radios.

In the post-World War II era, with the independence of the Transjordan and of Palestine looming, there was no longer a requirement for an Imperial Service unit in the region. On 9 February 1948 the 3,000 man Trans-Jordan Frontier Force was disbanded.

== Organization ==
The TJFF served under Headquarters, British Forces, in Palestine and Trans-Jordan, from 3 September 1939 until 9 February 1948. The O.C. TJFF was a British lieutenant colonel, with headquarters at Zerqa. Second-in-command was a British major, responsible for administration, workshops, quartermaster's stores and pay. The adjutant, another British major, was responsible for training and personnel and was aided by an assistant adjutant who was an Arab officer.

The squadrons and companies were all commanded by British majors, with another British officer as second-in-command. The cavalry squadrons were organised into three rifle troops (36 men) and one machine gun troop (36 rifles and 4 machine guns). The normal tactical and reconnaissance unit however, was the half-squadron or half-company and these were commanded by local captains. Each half-squadron or company consisted of two troops, led by local lieutenants and captains.

By the end of 1927 there were 39 officers, including 17 British, 12 British warrant officers, three staff sergeants and 676 other ranks. In 1930 there were 17 British officers, two in each of the four squadrons and companies with the remainder at Force HQ. In 1935 there were 24 British officers – the OC, seven majors and sixteen captains.

The TJFF spent its first six months training in Palestine at Sarafand then at Shunet Nimrin (from October 1926) in the Jordan Valley. TJFF HQ moved to Zerqa east of the Jordan River in Trans-Jordan. The cavalry squadrons were based at Zerqa and the camel company was based at Ma'an. In 1929, the TJFF was called upon to help deal with Arab unrest in Palestine. The camel company moved to Jericho and a cavalry squadron went to Jisr el Majamie. A second cavalry squadron was raised and dispatched as reinforcement in early 1930.

In 1930, the mechanised company, based at Ma'an, was formed and later that year the camel companies were disbanded. Motorisation extended the range of the TJFF further out into the desert. In 1930 the TJFF had 980 men, including 28 Jews.

== Officers Commanding ==
- Lieutenant-Colonel F. W. Bewsher, DSO, OBE, MC, 1 April 1926 – 1928.
- Major (local Lieutenant-Colonel) C. A. Shute, CBE, Indian Army, previously second-in-command, 1928 – 1933.
- Major (local Lieutenant-Colonel) C. H. Miller, 13th/18th Hussars, 1933 – 1936.
- Lieutenant-Colonel J. I. Chrystall, 1936 – May 1940.
- Lieutenant-Colonel P. L. Wilson, May 1940 – 1946.
- Colonel G. W. C. Montgomery 1946 - 1947.
- Colonel (later General Sir) John Hackett, former OC 4th Parachute Brigade, 1947 – 9 February 1948. (Hackett was previously seconded to TJFF from 1937 to 1941.)

== Quartermaster ==
Whilst most British officers were seconded to the TJFF typically for a period of about five years, the Quartermaster (QM) of the TJFF held the distinction of serving with the unit effectively throughout its duration, becoming a symbol of continuity. George Townsend Paley was a Great War veteran who had earned the DCM and had been commissioned as a quartermaster, or Lt.(QM). He was posted to the TJFF in 1926 as a local Captain and remained with it as the unit expanded in wartime. In 1941, he was awarded the OBE as a temporary lieutenant-colonel.

== TJFF Units ==
- HQ Wing, 1 April 1926 – 9 February 1948.
- "A" Squadron (cavalry), 1 April 1926 – 1 January 1941.
- "B" Squadron (cavalry), 1 April 1926 – 1 January 1941.
- "C" Squadron (cavalry), 1 April 1926 – 1 January 1941.
- Camel Company, 1 April 1926 – 1930, replaced by Mechanised Company.
- "D" Company (Mechanised), 1930 – February 1941. Based at the H4 pumping station on the Iraq Petroleum Company pipeline.
- "E" Company (Mechanised), 1933 – February 1941.
- Line of Communication Squadron, February – May 1941. Raised to protect the Baghdad–Haifa road, reformed as "L" Company in the 1st Mechanised Regiment, May 1941.
- Mobile Guard Squadron, 1 May 1941 – 9 February 1948. Formed to replace the Line of Communication Squadron in May 1941 and to take over the line of communication duties.

By 1929 there were also four Troops of Reservists

TJFF Regiments

- 1st Cavalry (Horsed) Regiment, 1 January 1941 – 9 February 1948. Based at Jisr el Majamie with "A", "B", and "C" Squadrons. (Cavalry)
- 1st Mechanised Regiment, February 1941 – 9 February 1948. Based at Irbid with "D", "E", and "L" Squadrons (Mechanised)

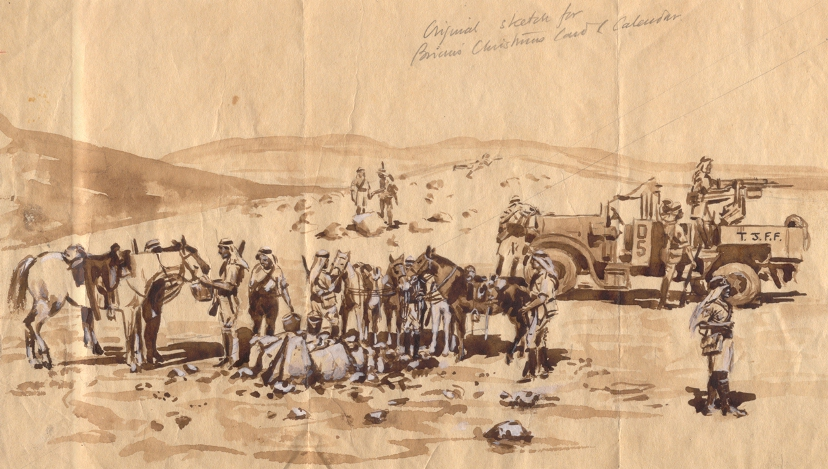
Drawing by Maj. Brian Maurice Goddard of his unit in the TJFF in 1940, sent to his father Lt.Col. Francis A. D'O Goddard

== Ethnicity ==
The first recruits to the TJFF were largely from the disbanded Palestine Gendarmerie. Palestinian Arabs made up around 70 percent of the other ranks. There were some Sudanese in the camel company before 1930 when the company was replaced by a mechanised company. Jews and Arabs, being better educated, served in the technical and administrative posts. By 1935 just under 25 percent of the Force were Circassians (a small ethnic, Muslim minority living in Trans-Jordan). The senior commanders were all British Army officers, however junior officers were Arabs, Circassians, Sudanese and a few Jews. In 1930, the strength of the TJFF was 980 men, including 28 Jews.

== See also ==
- Trans-Jordan Frontier Force Long Service and Good Conduct Medal
