= Palestine Police Force =

British colonial police service in Mandatory Palestine

Palestine Police Force قوات الشرطة الفلسطينية (Arabic) משטרת פלשתינה (Hebrew)
- Palestine Police Force badge

Agency overview
- Formed: July 1920
- Dissolved: May 1948
- Employees: 2,143 officers (1928): 1,764 Arabs; 321 Jews

Jurisdictional structure
- Operations jurisdiction: Mandatory Palestine

Operational structure
- Headquarters: Jerusalem, Palestine

The Palestine Police Force (PPF) was a British colonial police service established in Mandatory Palestine on 1 July 1920, when High Commissioner Sir Herbert Samuel's civil administration took over responsibility for security from General Allenby's Occupied Enemy Territory Administration. The police force was composed of Jewish, Arab, and British officers.

== Background ==
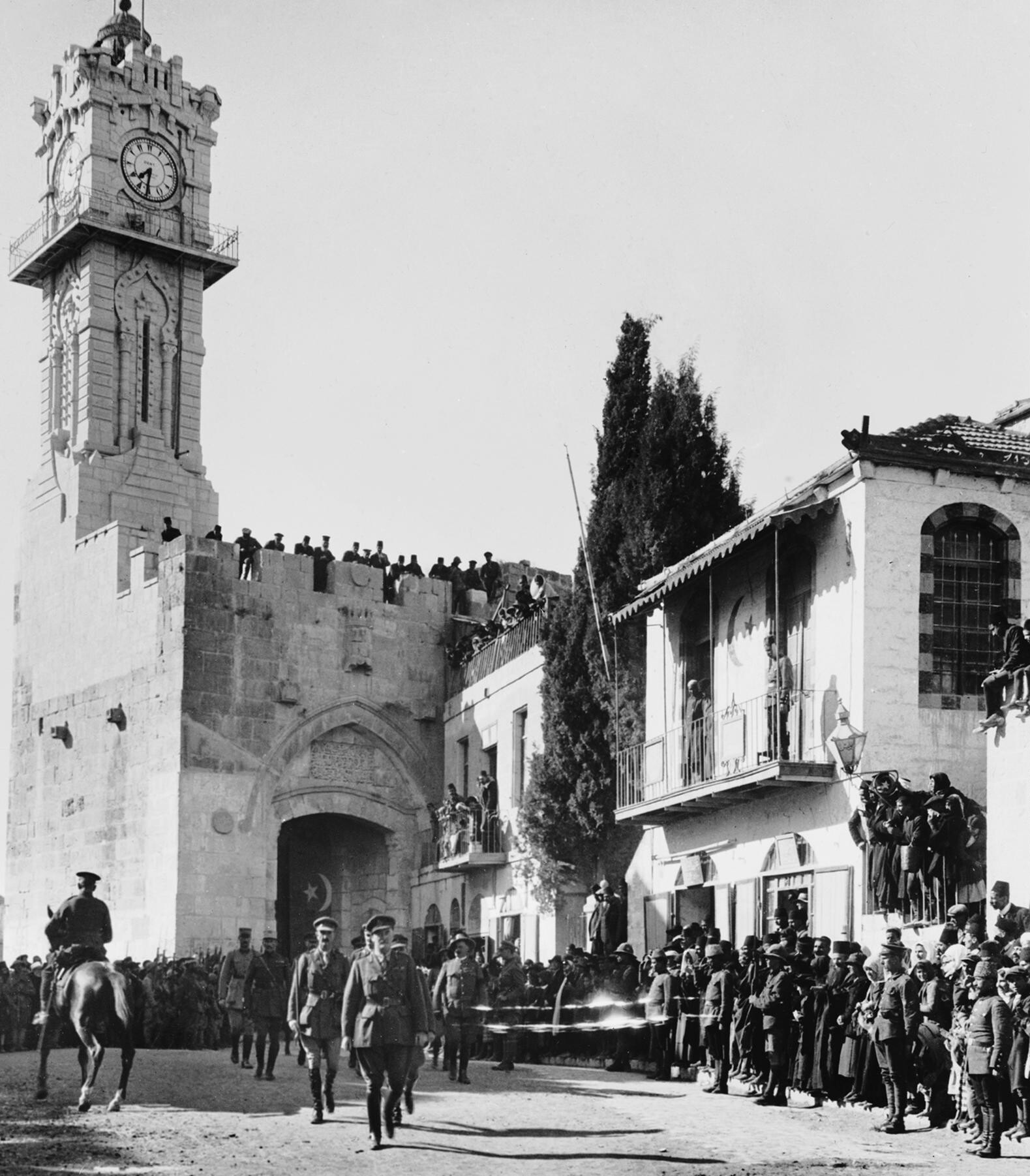
The victorious General Allenby, dismounted, enters Jerusalem through the Jaffa Gate on foot out of respect for the Holy City, December 11, 1917

The Egyptian Expeditionary Force (EEF) had won the decisive Battle of Gaza in November 1917 under the newly appointed Commander-in-chief of Palestine, General Sir Edmund Allenby. Following the Battle of Jerusalem in December, Allenby accepted the surrender of the city, which was placed under martial law, and guards were posted at several points within the city and in Bethlehem to protect sites held sacred by the Christian, Muslim, and Jewish religions. Following a decisive British victory at the Battle of Megiddo, the Ottoman Empire formally surrendered on 30 October 1918, leaving the British in complete control of Palestine.

Headquarters of the police in Jerusalem were initially set up in the Russian Compound, along Jaffa Road, where the assistant provost marshal was assisted by the British Royal Military Police (RMF). Initially Palestine was administered in the southern district of the Occupied Enemy Territory Administration (OETA). The Palestine Police Force was founded with the establishment in July 1920 of the civilian administration of the British Mandate under high commissioner Herbert Samuel.

The first police commander was Lieutenant Colonel P. B. Bramley, OBE, with the title of Director of Public Security and with the rank of Commandant of Police and Prisons. The police force at the time consisted of 18 British officers supported by 55 Palestinian officers and 1,144 rank and file, whose duties were described as:

"Besides fulfilling the ordinary duties of a constabulary, such as the preservation of law and order and the prevention and detection of crime, act as their numbers will allow as escorts for the protection of tax collectors, serve summonses issued by the judicial authorities, distribute Government notices and escort Government treasure throughout the country."

Legislative authority was granted eight months after-the-fact with Police Ordinance 1921, although the PPF's authority was never challenged legally.

== History ==
=== Palestine Gendarmerie ===
In 1926 the two gendarmeries (the British Gendarmerie, which had been mostly recruited from the disbanded Royal Irish Constabulary, and the Palestine Gendarmerie, known as the Mounted Police Force, and made up of Jews and Arabs) were disbanded, their members transferring to the British and Palestinian sections of the Palestine Police while most of the remainder joined a new Corps, the Transjordan Frontier Force.

Police inspection Kfar Saba 1934

=== 1929 riots ===
By 1928, the Force had 2,143 officers (all ranks): 321 Jews, 1293 Muslim Arabs and 471 Christian Arabs.

In January 1930, Herbert Dowbiggin, colonial Inspector General of Police of Ceylon, was sent to Palestine to advise on the re-organization of the PPF, and his report was submitted in May of that year. It was a highly confidential document which it was considered impossible to publish at the time.

On his advice, the British and Palestine Sections of the Police were reinforced, and deployed so that no important Jewish settlement or group of Jewish farms was without a detachment, with access to sealed armories, furnished with Greener guns. Each colony was provided with a telephone and the road network was improved to give the Police greater mobility.

=== Revolt of 1936–1939 ===
During the 1936–1939 Arab revolt in Palestine, additional police forces were established in Palestine by the British authorities, including the Jewish Settlement Police, Jewish Supernumerary Police and the joint Anglo-Jewish Special Night Squads, the counter-insurgency unit of the force, which gained a reputation for carrying out violent raids against Arab villages. Between 1936 and 1939, Arab officers became increasingly marginalized within the force, while British and Jewish policemen were increasingly mobilized to suppress the revolt. Prior to the revolt, the police force was majority Arab. However, during the years of the revolt, the police force became majority British, with the numbers of British officers in the police force growing from 900 to 2500.

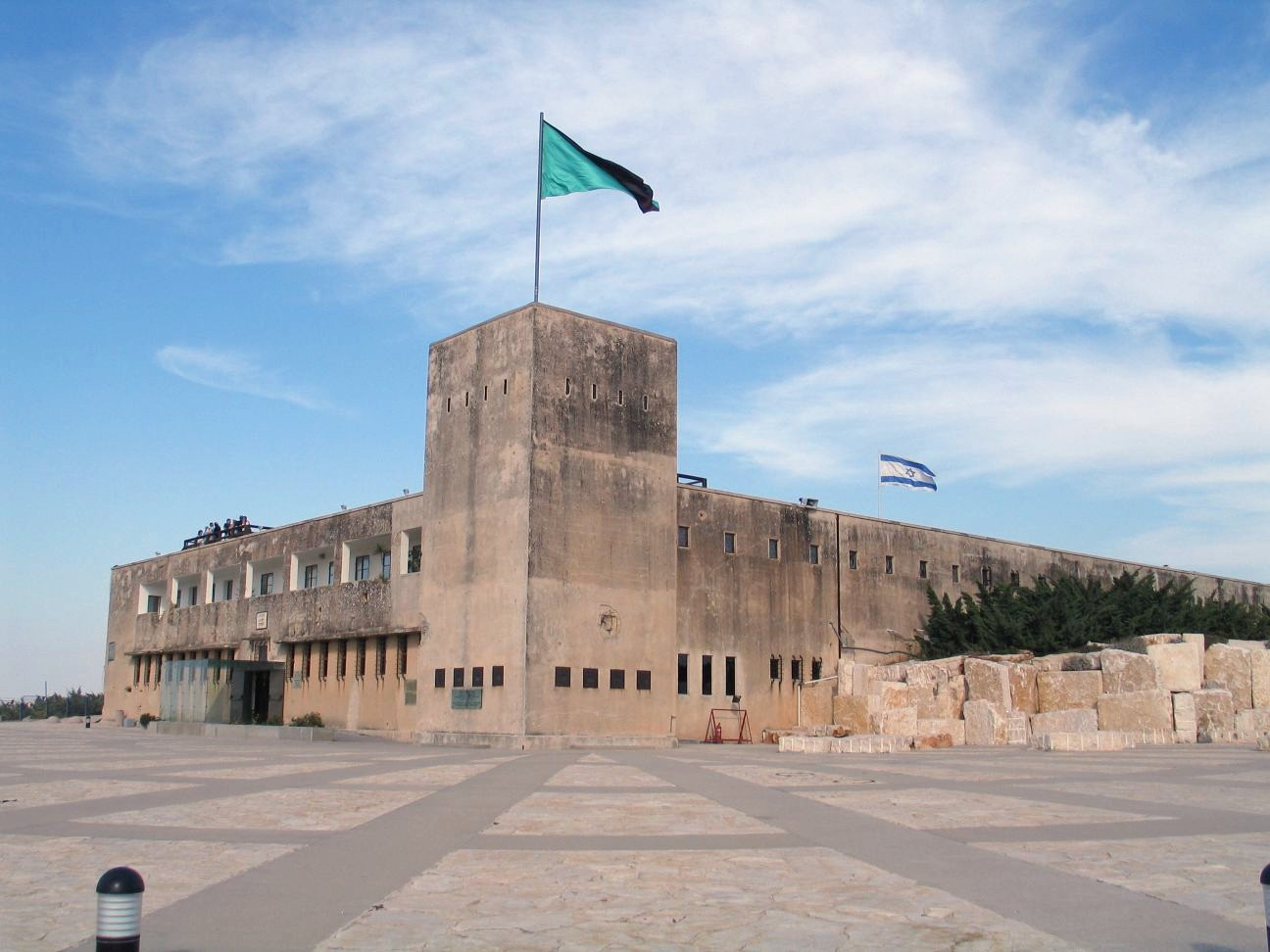
Tegart police fort at Latrun

=== Tegart forts ===
Colonial Office officials in London wanted Irish-born police officer and engineer Sir Charles Tegart to become Inspector-General of the Force in 1937. He refused but joined Sir David Petrie in visiting the territory (December 1937 – January 1938) to advise on dealing with Arab guerrillas.

Tegart forts are a style of militarized police fortress constructed to protect British forces throughout Mandatory Palestine during the Arab Revolt, in which 17 police force officers were killed in 1937 and 94 in 1938. The forts are named after Tegart, who designed them in 1938 based on his experiences in the Indian insurgency. Approximately 60 of the reinforced concrete block structures were built to the same basic plan, with larger designs at prominent locations. They were built both at strategic intersections in the interior of Mandatory Palestine and along the so-called Tegart's wall of the northern border with the French-administered Mandate for Syria and the Lebanon, where they were intended to prevent the flow of weapons.

Many of them stand to this day, and some continue to be used as jails and police stations.

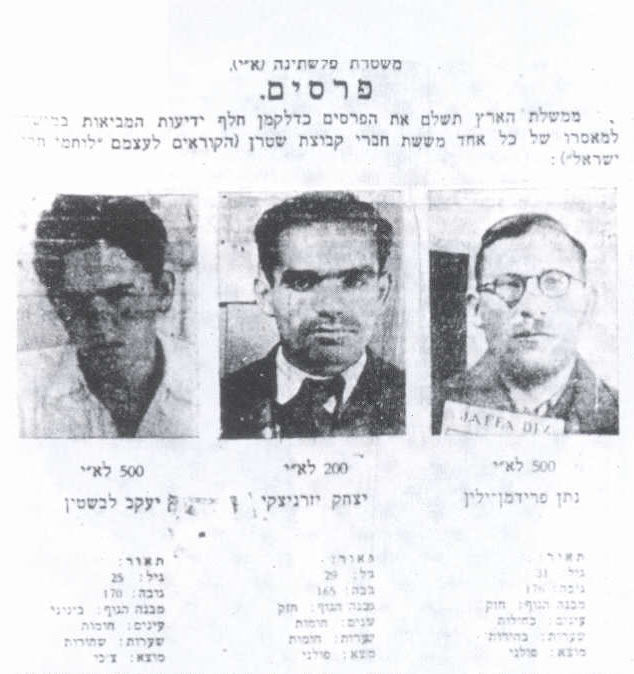
Wanted Poster of the Palestine Police Force offering rewards for the capture of Stern Gang members: Jaacov Levstein (Eliav); Yitzhak Yezernitzky (Shamir); and Natan Friedman-Yelin.

=== During and post-World War II ===
After the White Paper of 1939, the British limited Jewish immigration to Palestine during the Holocaust. The PPF was tasked with enforcing these restrictions, including intercepting illegal immigrants.

On 27 May 1942, the Police became a military force eligible to be deployed on military operations inside Mandatory Palestine and in Syria and Iraq.

In 1944, the Police Mobile Force (PMF) was created as a fully militarized strike force, which was part of and under the command of the Palestine Police. Established with 800 British servicemen, who had been on active wartime service in Italy, North Africa, and Britain, the PMF was organized, trained, and equipped along military lines. Members wore 'battle dress' and were trained in a special training depot based in Jenin.

=== End of the mandate ===
By the time of the 1947 UN Partition Plan the British members of the Force alone numbered 4,000.

The British mandate over Palestine was due to expire on 15 May 1948, but Jewish Leadership led by future-Prime Minister, David Ben-Gurion, declared the independence of the State of Israel on 14 May. Members of the PPF withdrew with the remainder of the British in Mandatory Palestine. However, the influence of the experienced Palestine Police Force reached its peak after the force was disbanded on 15 May, as around 1,400 policeman obtained postings with other police forces. In particular, a Special Constabulary of 500 former Palestine Police was established in Malaya after the state of emergency was declared in June 1948.

Officers who served in Malaya also transferred to colonial police forces in Kenya, Hong Kong, and Tanganyika. Along with the rest of the Palestinian population, Palestinian officers in the police force faced mass expulsion and displacement during the 1948 Nakba. The Palestine Police Force formed the basis upon which the Israel Police was founded. Hundreds of Jewish officers of the Palestine Police subsequently joined the Israel Police. The operating procedures of the Palestine Police remained intact in the Israel Police, and the Israel Police's uniforms and rank names were identical to those of the Palestine Police until 1958.

== Commandants of Police and Inspectors General ==
- Percy Bramley, Commandant of Police, July 1920 - March 1923.
- Arthur Mavrogordato, Commandant of Police, March 1923 - July 1931.
- R. G. B. Spicer, July 1931 - November 1937.
- Alan Saunders, November 1937 - August,1943.
- John Rymer-Jones, August 1943 - March 1946.
- Nicol Gray, March 1946 - May 1948.

== Notable members of the PPF ==
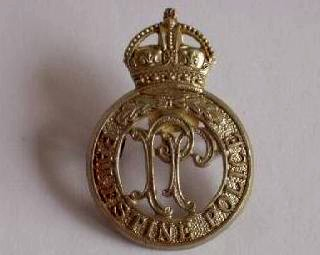
A cap badge of the Palestine Police Force (PPF)

- Gawain Bell, District Superintendent
- Ralph Cairns, commander of CID's Jewish Section. Assassinated by Irgun in 1939.
- Richard Catling, Assistant Inspector-General.
- Douglas Valder Duff, author
- Roy Farran, Organiser of the "Q" Patrols.
- Bernard Fergusson, Baron Ballantrae, Assistant Inspector-General, 1946–1947
- Josef Locke, Sergeant.
- Kenneth Newman, Detective, Palestine Special Branch
- Frederick Gerard Peake, District Commandant, Galilee
- Alan Lyle-Smith, Constable, later an actor and writer under the name of Alan Caillou
- Athalstan Popkess, Chief Constable Nottingham City Police
- Ernest R. Stafford, Assistant Superintendent, Jaffa, 1931–1936 and writer of 'Manual of Colloquial Arabic' which was issued to the Force. Stafford joined the PP from the Arab Legion, where he served as Lt. Colonel and second in command from 1924 to 1931, with the title, El Qaim E.R.Stafford Bey. He left the PP in 1936 to join the Colonial Office as Assistant-Commissioner Palestine, where he stayed until the end of the Mandate in 1948.
- W.J.Owen, Assistant Superintendent. Retired to Felixstowe, Suffolk

== Uniforms ==
Throughout most of its history the Palestine Police Force wore the standard khaki drill uniforms characteristic of British military and police forces serving in India and the Middle East. Until the 1940s British personnel were distinguished by pith helmets with dark blue edged puggaree bands while locally recruited officers wore fez-like headdresses.

== See also ==
- British Gendarmerie
- Transjordan Frontier Force
- Arab Legion
