= British Gendarmerie =

Force created in 1922 to police Mandatory Palestine

The British Gendarmerie was a British paramilitary police field force created by Colonial Secretary Winston Churchill in April 1922 to police Mandatory Palestine.

Concerned with the high cost of British Army units acting as police forces in Palestine, Churchill decided that an elite police force similar to the Royal Canadian Mounted Police or South African Constabulary would be created for Mandatory Palestine. The unit was intended more for riot control rather than crime solving.

Palestinian Arabs on the Advisory Council for the High Commissioner argued against the creation of the British Gendarmerie due to the belief that it implied Britain ruled Palestine as a colony rather than a country. The mandate government concluded by creating two gendarmeries; Both were under the control of British officials but one unit was made up of Jews and Arabs while the latter was entirely British. The latter was the British Gendarmerie.

The 43 officers and 700 other ranks force were mostly recruited from the recently disbanded Royal Irish Constabulary and its Auxiliary Division who had themselves been recruited from ex-officers of the Great War. Estimates conclude that 75% to 95% of the recruits were originally the Black and Tans members of these disbanded units. These ex-officers of Black and Tans came from a multitude of backgrounds ranging from debarred lawyers to excommunicated priests. These officers, during their time as Black and Tans accrued a reputation of brutality as they were known for torture, civilian reprisals, and executions. Many of its original formations had been intended to be horse mounted but these plans were dropped in an economy measure.

The force was disbanded in June 1926 due to financial constraints. The Transjordan Frontier Force subsequently took over the force’s duties.

== After Disbandment ==
Around 200 of these former Black and Tans were reported to stay in the Mandate and were relocated to other sections of the Palestine Police after Force's disbandment. Many of these officials ended up as the highest rank offered in the Palestine Police. Some of these officials also were shown to be the police involved in the precursor event to the 1929 Palestine Riots and were accused of excessive brutality.

== See also ==
- Palestine Police Force
- Arab Legion
- United States Zone Constabulary (Similar body in some respects, based in the US occupation zone of Germany in the immediate post-World War II period.)
