= Richard Catling =

British police officer

Sir Richard Charles Catling CMG, OBE, KPM (22 August 1912 – 22 March 2005) was a British police officer who rose to the rank of Commissioner of Police in Kenya from 1954 to 1963.

Catling was previously an officer with the Palestine Police from 1935 until the British pulled out of the country in 1948, rising to the rank of assistant inspector-general of the CID in Jerusalem. After that, he went on to play a role in countering insurgencies in Malaya and Kenya.

== Early life ==
Catling was born in Suffolk into a family of butchers and farmers. He attended grammar school in Bungay, then joined a London textile company. Finding his job dull, he was on his way home by train one day in 1935, when he spotted an old friend standing on a station platform. His friend pointed out a poster calling for volunteers to join the Palestine Police. Catling crossed the platform and volunteered.

== Career ==
=== Palestine ===
Catling joined the political branch of the CID in Jerusalem in 1936 and rose to the rank of assistant inspector-general CID in 1945, was awarded the Kings Police Medal, and held his post until the British withdrawal in 1948.

=== Malaysia ===
He then joined the Malay Police, helping deal with the Communist insurgency and being awarded the OBE in 1951. He took home leave in 1952 to marry Mary Joan Lewis (who predeceased him).

=== Kenya ===
In 1954, he became Commissioner of Police in Kenya, during the Mau Mau rebellion. Shortly after his appointment, he visited Jomo Kenyatta in jail, hoping to understand the basis for Kikuyu discontent. They got on well, and Kenyatta kept Catling on as Inspector-General of Police for a year after he came to power. He was appointed CMG for his services to Kenya in 1956.

=== Retirement ===
He was knighted on his retirement as Inspector-General of Police in 1964, and was made a Freeman of the City of London in 1979.
