= Alan Saunders (police officer) =

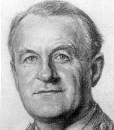

Alan Saunders, CMG, OBE (1886–1964) was Inspector-General of Police in Mandatory Palestine between November 1937 and August 1943.

Saunders was educated at Christ's Hospital. His career was as follows: served Indian Police, 1908–14; war service, 1914–1920, in France, Flanders and Palestine; District Commandant, Jerusalem, Mandatory Palestine Police, 1920–26; Deputy Inspector-General, 1926–35; OBE 1932; Inspector-General, Nigeria Police, 1936–37; Inspector-General of Police and Prisons, Mandatory Palestine, 1937; Member, Palestine Advisory Council, 1937–43; CMG 1941; retired from Colonial Service, 1944; Chief Police Adviser, Allied Military HQ (Greece), 1944; Director, Middle East Censorship, 1945–46; Commissioner Police, Tripolitania, 1946–1952. Married, 1920, Eva Strickland (d. 1952): 1 son.
