= Chris Sims =

Chris or Christopher Sims may refer to:

- Christopher A. Sims (1942–2026), American macroeconomist
- Chris Sims (police officer), British Chief Constable
- Chris Sims (priest) (born 1949), Anglican priest
- Chris Whitey Sims (born 1966), musician and songwriter

== See also ==
- Chris Simms (disambiguation)
