= West Midlands Police =

British territorial police force

- Logo
- Abbreviation: WMP

Agency overview
- Formed: 1 April 1974; 52 years ago
- Preceding agencies: Birmingham City Police; West Midlands Constabulary; Parts of Staffordshire County and Stoke-on-Trent Constabulary, Warwickshire and Coventry Constabulary and West Mercia Constabulary
- Annual budget: £655.6 million (2021/22)
- Legal personality: Police force

Jurisdictional structure
- Operations jurisdiction: West Midlands, United Kingdom
- Jurisdictional area shown within England
- Area: 348 square miles (900 km^{2})
- Population: 2.93 million
- Legal jurisdiction: England & Wales
- Constituting instrument: Police Act 1996
- General nature: Local civilian police

Operational structure
- Overseen by: His Majesty's Inspectorate of Constabulary and Fire & Rescue Services; Independent Office for Police Conduct
- Headquarters: Birmingham; 52°29′01″N 1°53′50″W
- Constables: 6,846 police officers; 219 special constables
- PCSOs: 484
- Police and Crime Commissioner responsible: Simon Foster
- Agency executive: Scott Green, Chief Constable
- Parent agency: Home Office
- Local Policing Area’s: 8

Facilities
- Stations: 52

Website
- www.westmidlands.police.uk

West Midlands Police is the territorial police force responsible for policing the metropolitan county of West Midlands in the U.K..

The force covers an area of 348 square miles (900 km^{2}) with 2.93 million inhabitants, which includes the cities of Birmingham, Coventry, Wolverhampton and also the Black Country. In 2020, there were 6,846 officers, 484 police community support officers (PCSO), and 219 volunteer special constables.

The force is led by Chief Constable Scott Green. The force area is divided into ten Local Policing Areas (LPAs), each being served by four core policing teams – Response, Neighbourhood, CID and Priority Crime (PCT) – with the support of a number of specialist crime teams. These specialist teams include MCU, traffic and a firearms unit.

West Midlands Police was a partner, alongside Staffordshire Police, in the Central Motorway Police Group which has since been disbanded and the officers returned to their respective forces.

== History ==
=== Regional policing in the West Midlands prior to 1974 ===
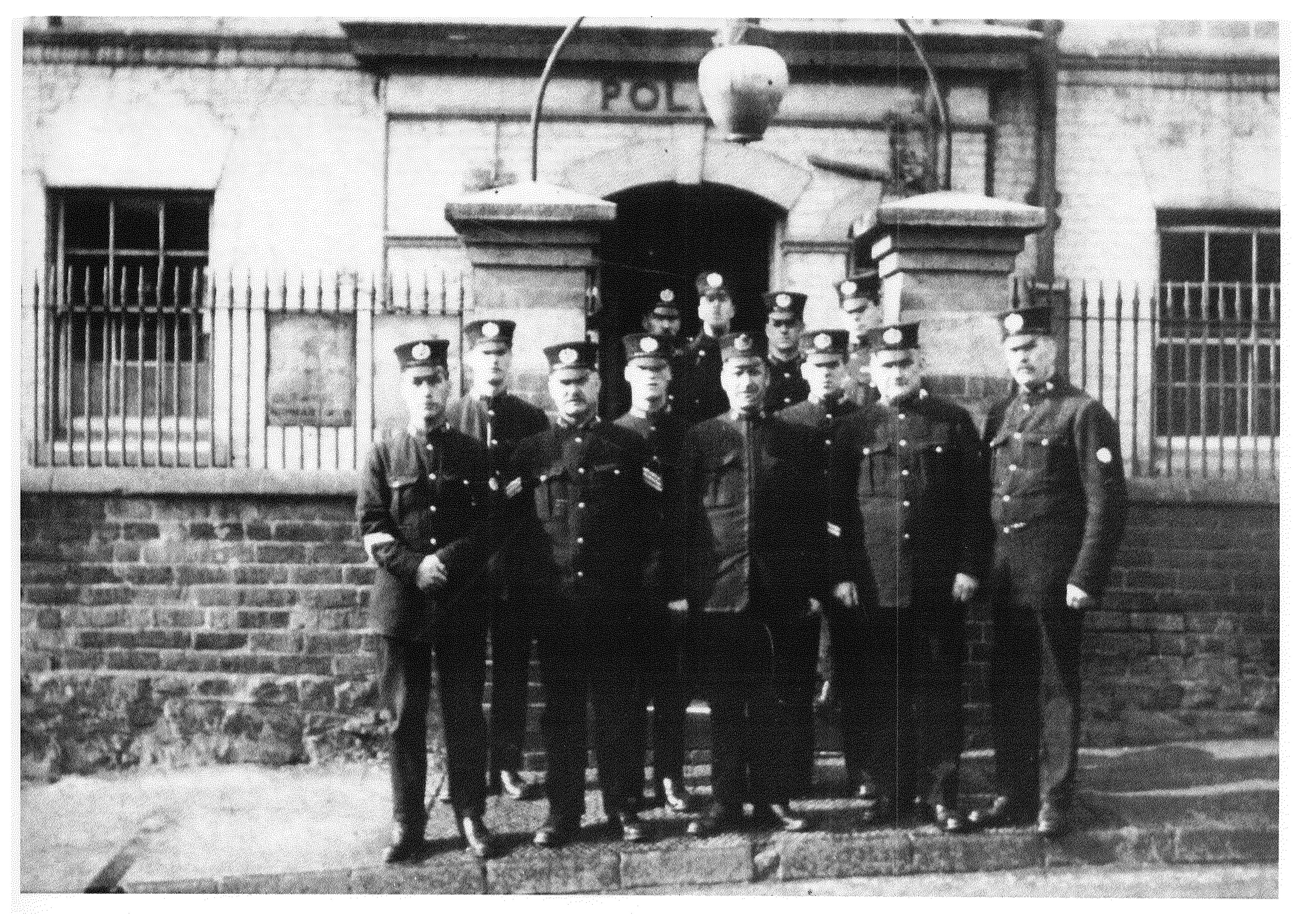
Historical image of Sedgley police station

Prior to the formation of West Midlands Police as it is known today, the area now covered by the force was served by a total of six smaller constabularies. These constabularies were as follows:

- Birmingham City Police 1839–1974: Established in 1839 following an outbreak of Chartist rioting that the Metropolitan Police had to help quell, officers from Birmingham City Police first took to the streets on 20 November of that year. Initially with a strength of 260 officers paid at a rate of 17 shillings a week, the constabulary expanded to keep pace with the growth of the city with the final areas to be added before the force's amalgamation in West Midlands Police being the Hollywood area.
- Coventry Police 1836–1974: Formed with the Municipal Corporations Act in 1836, Coventry Police was initially only twenty officers with the support of a single sergeant and one inspector. The force reached a strength of 137 officers by 1914 and continued to grow until in 1969 it was merged with the Warwickshire and Coventry Constabulary, part of which it remained until the formation of West Midlands Police.
- Dudley Borough Police 1920–1966: Formerly part of the Worcestershire Constabulary, Dudley gained its own police force on 1 April 1920 following a review by His Majesty's Inspector that had suggested previous policing arrangements were unsatisfactory. Dudley Borough Police remained independent until the Royal Commission in 1960 which resulted in its inclusion as part of the newly formed West Midlands Constabulary.
- Walsall Borough Police 1832–1966: Moving away from a 'watch' system, Walsall Borough Police were formed on 6 July 1832 with an initial strength of only one superintendent and three constables. As with the other regional forces, Walsall Borough Police expanded with the area's population and in 1852 appointed its first two detectives. The force took on its first female recruits in 1918 and in the 1960s became one of the first forces to issues its officers with personal radios. As with Dudley's police force, Walsall Borough Police became part of the West Midlands Constabulary following the Royal Commission.
- West Midlands Constabulary 1966–1974: Lasting only eight years, West Midlands Constabulary was a newly formed force encompassing a number of smaller borough forces including Dudley Borough Police, Walsall Borough Police, Wolverhampton Borough Police and parts of Staffordshire and Worcestershire Constabularies. The creation of the West Midlands Constabulary was the consequence of 1960's Royal Commission into policing.
- Wolverhampton Borough Police 1837–1966: The formation of Wolverhampton Borough Police was approved on 3 August 1837 under the condition that the strength of the force not exceed sixteen men. The Police Act 1839 saw Staffordshire County Police taking over policing in Wolverhampton with Wolverhampton Borough Police regaining responsibility for policing the town in 1848. At the turn of the 20th century the force was 109 strong, reaching a highpoint of around 300 before the force became part of the short lived West Midlands Constabulary in 1966.

=== Establishment of West Midlands Police ===
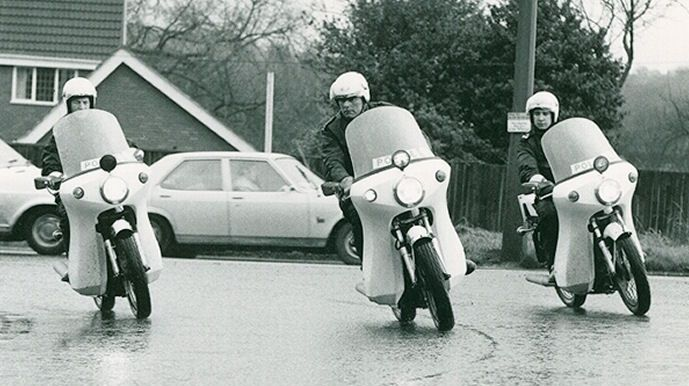
West Midlands Police motorbikes in the 1970s

West Midlands Police was formed on 1 April 1974, owing to the provisions of the Local Government Act 1972 which created the new West Midlands metropolitan county. It was formed by merging the Birmingham City Police, the earlier West Midlands Constabulary, and parts of Staffordshire County and Stoke-on-Trent Constabulary, Warwickshire and Coventry Constabulary and West Mercia Constabulary. The first Chief Constable appointed to the new force was Sir Derrick Capper, the last Chief Constable of Birmingham Police.

=== Controversies and allegations of corruption ===
Between 1974 and 1989, the force operated the West Midlands Serious Crime Squad. It was disbanded after allegations of endemic misconduct, leading to a series of unsafe convictions. These included allegations that officers had falsified confessions in witness statements, denied suspects access to solicitors and used torture such as "plastic bagging" to partially suffocate suspects in order to extract confessions. They were alleged to have abused payments to informers. A series of around 40 prosecutions failed in the late 1980s as defendants showed that evidence had or may have been tampered with. West Yorkshire Police led an investigation which led to a small number of internal disciplinary proceedings, but did not recommend any prosecutions for lack of evidence. However, over 60 convictions secured from their investigations have now been quashed, including those of the Birmingham Six.

West Midlands Police had two serious firearms incidents, in 1980 and 1985. In 1980, David Pagett held his pregnant girlfriend as hostage while resisting arrest by the police. Officers returned fire, and shot her. Police had initially tried to claim that Pagett has shot her, but it became clear that it was police bullets that had caused her death. In 1985, John Shorthouse was arrested by West Midlands police for questioning about armed robberies in South Wales. His house was then searched. His five-year-old son, John, was shot by police searching under the child's bed. An internal inquiry was held, and as a result, use of firearms was restricted to a specialised and trained unit.

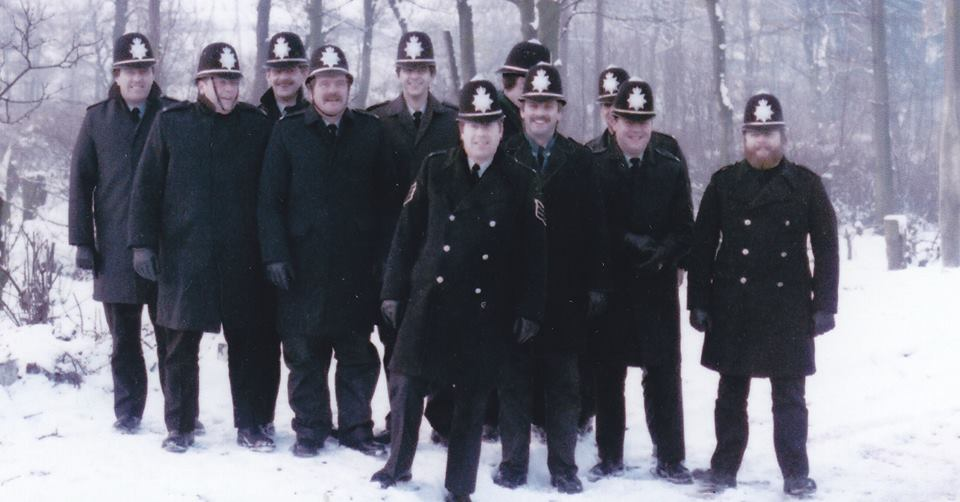
West Midlands Police Officers during the Miners Strike, 1984.

Allegations of bribery and corruption were made in 1994 by World in Action, an investigative current affairs TV programme. The convicted criminal David Harris alleged that West Midlands police officers had demanded payments of more than £200,000 to keep criminals including himself away from prosecutions. Other allegations from police officers focused on officers attempting to persuade others to accept bribes. The CID was the focus of an investigation by Leicestershire Police at the request of the Police Complaints Authority.

=== 2000s and onwards ===
Under proposals announced by the then Home Secretary, Charles Clarke, on 6 February 2006, West Midlands Police would have merged with Staffordshire Police, West Mercia Constabulary and Warwickshire Constabulary to form a single strategic force for the West Midlands region. This, along with a number of other mergers which would have cut the number of forces in England and Wales from 43 to 24, were abandoned in July 2006 after widespread opposition from police and the public.

Because of prison overcrowding in October 2006, up to 44 prison cells at Steelhouse Lane police station in Birmingham were made available to house inmates as part of Operation Safeguard and in accordance with an agreement between West Midlands Police and HM Prison Service.

In October 2008, the Chief Constable Sir Paul Scott-Lee announced he would not be renewing his contract in May 2009, after seven years in the post. His replacement was Chris Sims.

The force attracted controversy in 2010 when Project Champion, a £3 million scheme to install a network of CCTV cameras in the predominantly Muslim areas of Washwood Heath and Sparkbrook, came under fire from local residents and civil rights organisations. A total of 218 cameras had been planned for installation but the project was abandoned following concerns over their legality and objections from residents and local councillors that they had not been consulted by the force.

Between April and September 2010, WMP budgets were cut by £3.4 million as part of a programme to reduce spending by £50M over four years. In response to the 2010 Comprehensive Spending Review, Chief Constable Sims said WMP would need to reduce spending by up to £123 million over the same period.

In 2010, the force implemented regulation A19, requiring officers with 30 or more years service to retire, in response to government funding cuts. The regulation, used by 15 forces to make emergency savings, led to 591 WMP officers being forced to retire. Some of these officers later took WMP to an employment tribunal, alleging age discrimination. In 2014 the tribunal found the regulation to be unlawful. In 2015, 498 former WMP officers were seeking compensation. The ruling was later overturned by the Employment Appeal Tribunal, whose decision was upheld in the Court of Appeal in 2017.

Plans to privatise parts of the force were halted by Bob Jones, the force's first Police and Crime Commissioner, upon taking office in 2012.

Chief Constable Chris Sims was reappointed to a second three-year term in 2013, then stepped down at the beginning of 2016. He was succeeded by Dave Thompson, who had previously been Deputy Chief Constable.

In March 2021, Oliver Banfield, a probationary officer with West Midlands Police, was convicted of assault by beating after using techniques taught in police training to attack a woman while off-duty. Banfield was sentenced to a 14-week curfew and ordered to pay £500 compensation to his victim. Former Leader of the Opposition Harriet Harman described the fact Banfield did not receive a custodial sentence as “proof ... that [the] system fails women and protects men”. After the conviction, the Crown Prosecution Service apologised for initially declining to charge Banfield. In a May 2021 hearing, Banfield was found guilty of gross misconduct and banned from policing for life.

A 2021 investigation by Newsnight and The Law Society Gazette found that alleged hate crimes in which the victim was a police officer were significantly more likely to result in a successful prosecution across a number of force areas including the West Midlands. The investigation found that in the year ending March 2020, crimes against police officers and staff constituted 7 percent of hate incidents recorded by West Midlands Police, but resulted in 43 percent of hate crimes convictions. In March 2022, a WMP constable resigned after having been found to have fabricated the death of a partner in order to receive bereavement leave and other benefits; Chief Constable Thompson said the officer would have been dismissed for gross misconduct had he not resigned.

In November 2023, His Majesty's Inspectorate of Constabulary placed West Midlands police under "special measures", and the force's monitoring level was enhanced, as it was "not effectively addressing the inspectorate's concerns". The inspectors reported that the force was not carrying out investigations effectively or managing the public's risk from known sex offenders. The chief constable and West Midlands Police and Crime Commissioner Simon Foster said he completely disagreed with the decision.

In late 2025, West Midlands Police faced criticism for their involvement in the decision to ban Maccabi Tel Aviv supporters from attending their team's match with Aston Villa.

== Leadership and performance ==
As of 2018, West Midlands Police was smaller than at any previous time in its history, having lost nearly 2,300 officers since 2010. Government funding for West Midlands Police fell by £145M since 2010. In 2018, Chief Constable Dave Thompson said that falling numbers of police officers due to funding cuts, and a "wider spread of crime", prevented the police doing everything the public want or expect of them.

=== Leadership ===
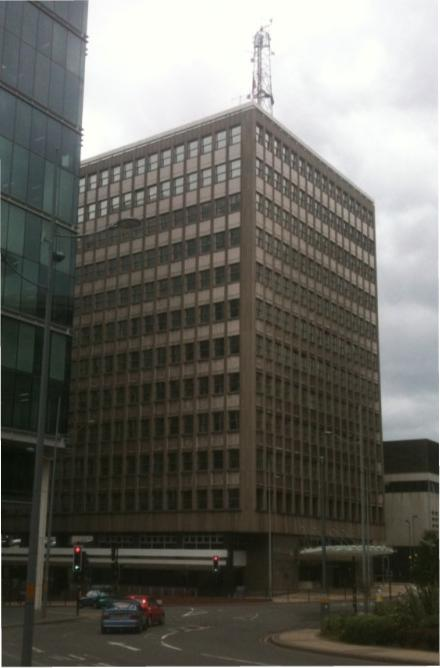
West Midlands Police HQ - Lloyd House

The current chief constable is Scott Green.

==== Chief constables ====
- Sir Derrick Capper (1974–1975)
- Philip Knights (1975–1985)
- Sir Geoffrey Dear (1985–1990)
- Sir Ron Hadfield (1990–1996)
- Sir Edward Crewe (1996–2002)
- Sir Paul Scott-Lee (2002–2009)
- Chris Sims (1 June 2009 – January 2016)
- Sir Dave Thompson (January 2016 – December 2022)
- Craig Guildford (December 2022 – November 2024)
- Scott Green (acting, November – December 2024) (Note: Guildford retired for one month in order to protect his pension, which would've fallen in value after 30 years' unbroken service, before taking up the post again. Scott Green served as Acting Chief Constable in the interim.)
- Craig Guildford (December 2024 – January 2026)
- Scott Green (September 2026– present, acting from January 2026)

=== Police and Crime Commissioner ===
The West Midlands Police and Crime Commissioner (PCC), established in 2012 as one of several directly-elected police and crime commissioners, is responsible for oversight and accountability for WMP and appoints the chief constable. As of 2021, the PCC is Simon Foster.

The West Midlands PCC replaces the West Midlands Police Authority, which was founded in 1996. Before it was replaced, the chair of the West Midlands Police Authority was Bishop Dr Derek Webley, of the New Testament Church of God in Handsworth, the first non-politician member of Authority to be elected chair, and the first African-Caribbean chair of any police authority in the United Kingdom.

=== Crime statistics and budget ===
The following table shows the percentage of cases resulting in a criminal charge or court summons in West Midlands Police's jurisdiction, by offence group, for the period from April 2020 to March 2021:

	Criminal damage and arson	Drug offences	Possession of weapons offences	Public order offences	Robbery	Sexual offences	Theft offences	Violence against the person	Miscellaneous crimes against society	Total
West Midlands Police	4%	17%	23%	5%	7%	2%	4%	3%	7%	4%
England and Wales	5%	20%	34%	8%	7%	4%	5%	7%	12%	7%

Dave Thompson stated that unforeseen pensions expenses of £8.6M in 2019 and £13.9M in 2020, from a budget of £514M cost roughly as much as 500 officers and would lower the total number of officers to 6,000, contrasted with 8,600 in 2010. Thompson added, “There is no question there will be more obvious rationing of services. The public can already see it is going on. We are already not pursuing crimes where we could find a suspect. We are doing things now that surprise me. We are struggling to deliver a service to the public. I think criminals are well aware now how stretched we are. These further cuts will leave us smaller than we have ever been. There is unquestionably more demand than there was in 1974.”

In the 2021/22 financial year, West Midlands Police's budget was £655.6M, an increase from £619.7M in 2020/21.

=== Officers killed in the line of duty ===
The following officers of West Midlands Police are listed by the Police Roll of Honour Trust as having died attempting to prevent, stop or solve a crime:

- 1975: PC David Christopher Green. Fatally stabbed during an arrest
- 1984: PC Andrew Stephen Le Comte. Fell from a roof while searching for suspects
- 1984: PC Colin John Hall. Collapsed attending a disturbance and died
- 1988: PC Gavin Richard Carlton. Shot by armed robber during a police pursuit
- 1989: PC Anthony John Salt. Fatally injured by falling on a mechanical digger after getting drunk on duty
- 2001: PC Malcolm Edward Walker. Fatally injured when his motorcycle was struck during a police pursuit
- 2004: DC Michael Swindells. Fatally stabbed; posthumously awarded Queen's Gallantry Medal

== Structure and departments ==
West Midlands Police covers an area of 348 square miles (900 km^{2}) with 2.93 million inhabitants, which includes the cities of Birmingham, Coventry, Wolverhampton and also the Black Country. As of September 2020, the force has 6,846 police officers, 219 special constables, and 467 police community support officers (PCSO), 165 police support volunteers (PSV), and 3,704 staff. In 2019, 10.9% of officers were from a BAME background, compared with 8.5% in 2014.

=== Local Policing Areas ===
The area covered by West Midlands Police is divided into seven Local Policing Areas (LPAs). Each LPA is headed by a chief superintendent, responsible for the overall policing and management of the area, supported by a Senior Leadership Team (SLT) composed of a varying number of superintendents and chief inspectors.

Each LPA has a number of dedicated Neighbourhood Policing teams. These cover a specific area and are headed by a sergeant with support from a number of police officers, PCSOs and sometimes special constables. The force operates a number of police stations.

=== Core policing teams ===
West Midlands Police is structured in such a way that there are a number of key teams in each LPA who have the responsibility for dealing with everyday policing duties. The force's current structure was gradually introduced over the past two years with the Solihull and Birmingham South LPUs being the first area to see the change in June 2011, and the Walsall LPU being the last in January 2013. The structural change was introduced as part of the force's 'Continuous Improvement' programme with the ambition of working in a more cost effective and efficient manner and was overseen under the advice of accounting firm KPMG.

Prior to Continuous Improvement, the force had operated with larger response and neighbourhood teams and smaller teams allocated to prisoner handling roles. Community action and priority teams were a new addition to the force's structure under Continuous Improvement.

The core policing teams are:

==== Priority Crime Teams (PCT) ====
The 'PCT' support neighbourhood officers to address local issues and resource demands for service not met by other departments. They include teams like Operation Skybridge, who operate in Birmingham, tackling serious and acquisitive crime. They can be allocated to neighbourhoods suffering particular issues, for example anti-social behaviour, and are also often public order trained, so are used for policing football matches, demonstrations and similar occasions. As with the investigation teams, the community action and priority teams are supervised by a sergeant, who reports to an inspector.

Key responsibilities of community action and priority teams are as follows:

- Supporting neighbourhood teams – Providing specialist support to Neighbourhood Teams for example, conducting drugs warrants or addressing anti-social behaviour.
- Addressing local issues – Supporting other front line policing teams and completing tasking as directed by LPU local command teams
- Providing support for abstractions – Resourcing abstractions such as football matches, demonstrations and similar incidents so that Neighbourhood officers are able to focus on their beats.

==== Investigation teams ====
Officers on investigation teams have three main responsibilities, these being secondary investigation, prisoner handling and attending scheduled appointments with the public. These officers are also responsible for completing prosecution files and other paperwork necessary for taking cases to court. Investigation teams are split into a number of shifts, each supervised by a sergeant, and will have an inspector supervising the sergeants.

Key responsibilities of investigation teams are as follows:

- Secondary investigation – Following initial attendance of incidents by Response Team officers, investigations are allocated to investigation teams who conduct any follow up enquiries that are required.
- Prisoner handling – Offenders arrested by response and neighbourhood officers are handed to investigation teams who will interview and retain ownership of the investigation up to the point of its conclusion.
- Scheduled response – Operating on a diary system, investigation team officers attend pre-booked slots with members of the public who are wanting to report none urgent matters.

==== Neighbourhood teams ====
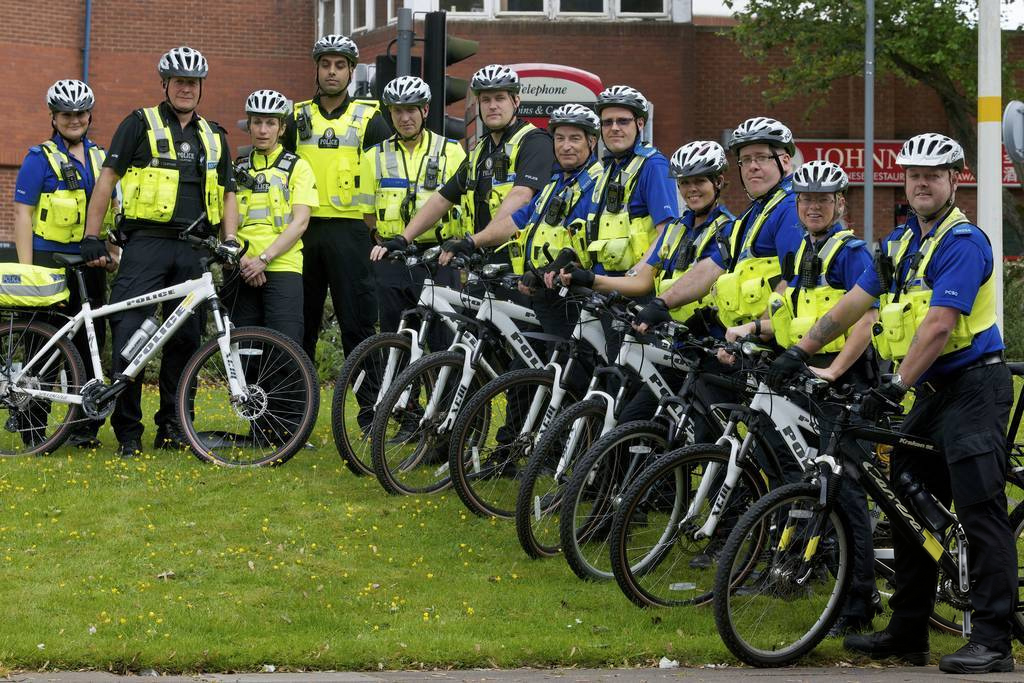
Neighbourhood officers with their bikes

Aligned to specific neighbourhoods, these officers seek to tackle long term issues affecting local areas and attend community meetings. There are 171 neighbourhoods across the West Midlands, and officers assigned to neighbourhood teams are often supported by PCSOs and special constables. It is not uncommon for busier areas, such as town centres, to have several neighbourhood teams such as the St. Matthews beat covering Walsall town centre, which has two teams. Neighbourhood teams usually have a single sergeant who reports to a sector inspector.

==== Response ====
Response officers work in shifts around the clock answering the most urgent calls for service received through the force's call centres. It is not unusual for response officers to work alone and each response shift usually has a number of officers who are authorised to carry Taser. In addition to Taser, some response officers also carry mobile fingerprint ID machines to confirm identities at the roadside. Response officers undergo enhanced driving training and also have a range of other skills required to perform their role including 'method of entry' training so that they can force entry into premises. Many response officers are also public order trained in order to respond to spontaneous disorder should it occur. Response teams are supervised by a number of sergeants and an inspector.

Key responsibilities of response teams are as follows:

- Primary investigation – Attending incidents in the first instance, Response officers gather available evidence and record offences. Follow up enquiries are then allocated to the investigation teams.
- Missing person enquiries – Response officers conduct investigations into missing persons with a low or medium risk assessment.
- Traffic – Officers from response teams attend reported road traffic accidents, sometimes supporting force traffic in the case of serious collisions.

=== Specialist crime teams ===
The core policing teams are supported by, and work closely with, a number of specialist crime teams. West Midlands Police had a mounted division which was disbanded in 1999 to divert funds elsewhere. The Chief Constable has recently announced plans for this unit to be reintroduced after success in using horses from other forces in the West Midlands, at large scale public order events. Current specialist crime teams include:

==== Air operations ====
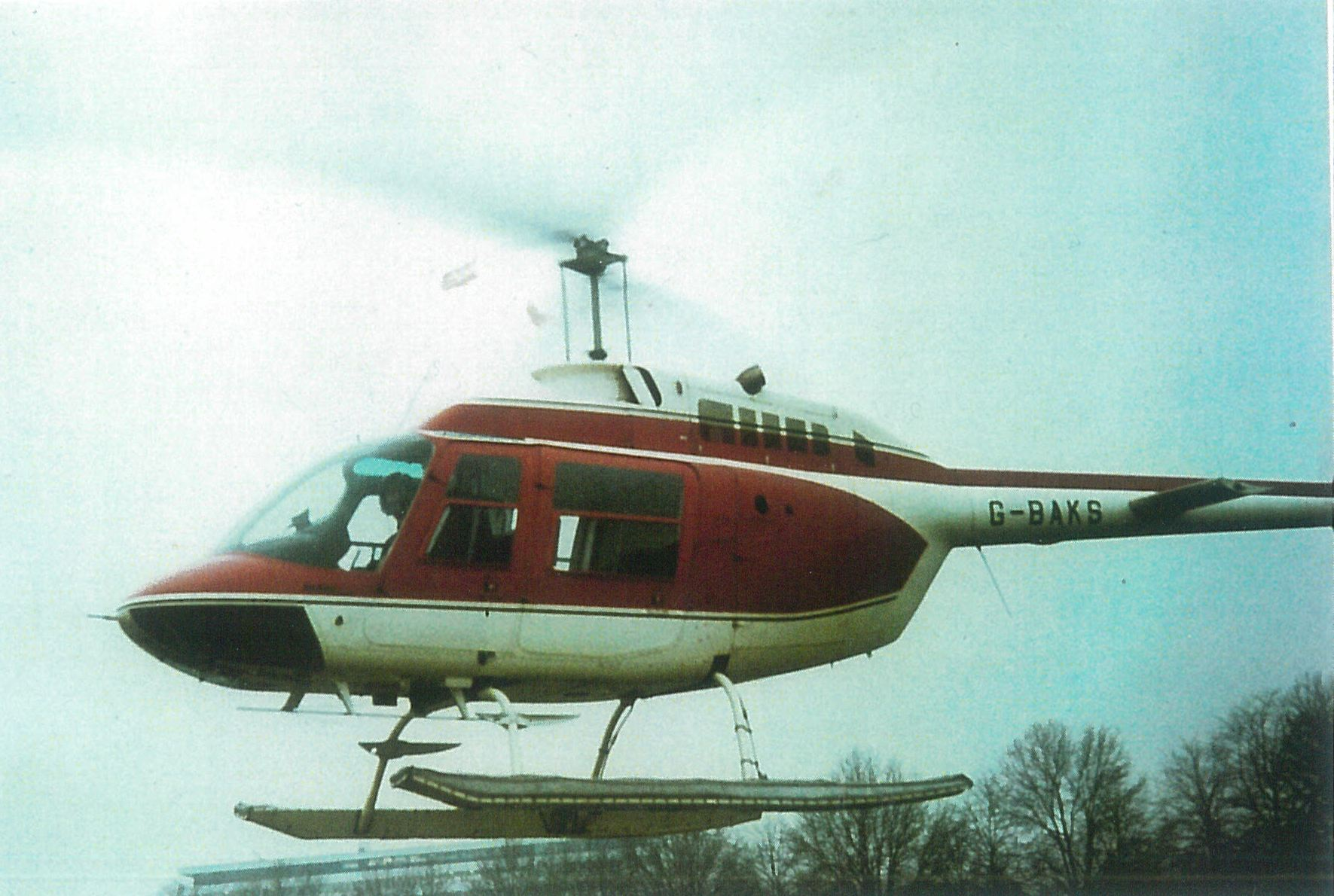
G-BAKS on hire to West Midlands police in 1978

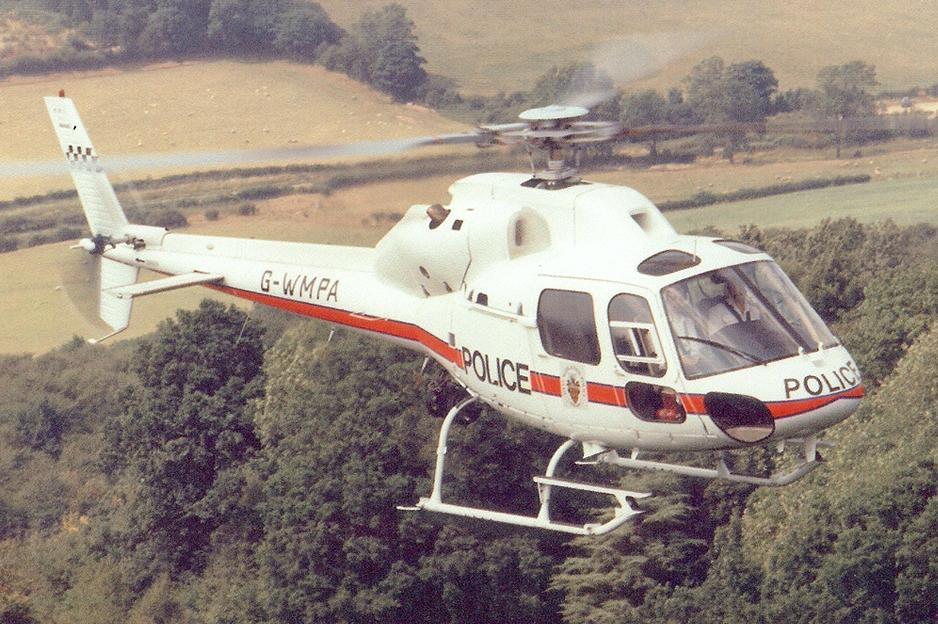
Previous helicopter, G-WMPA, an Aérospatiale AS355 F2.

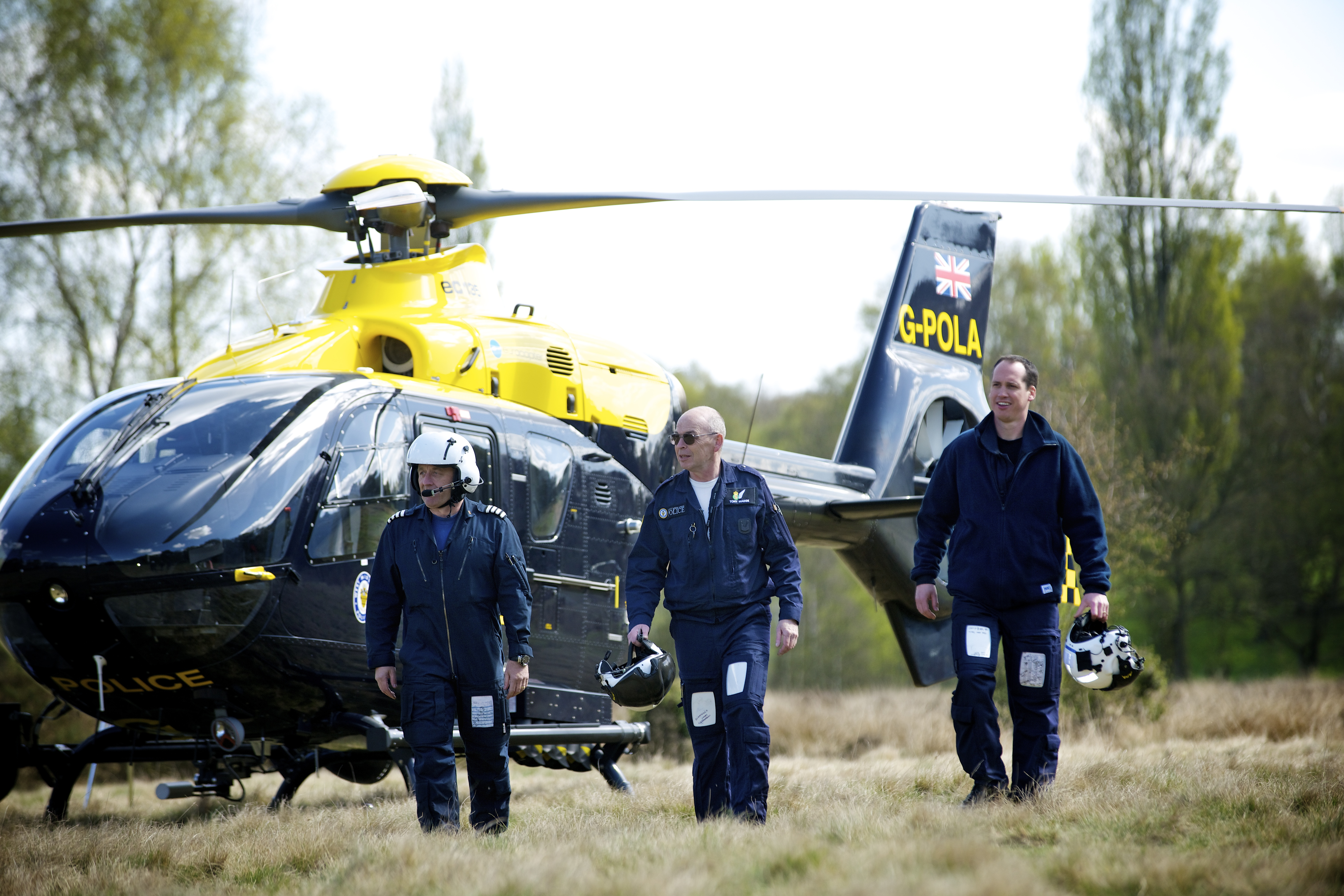
The force helicopter in Sutton Park

Air operations in the force's area have been provided by the National Police Air Service since 2012. Previously, the Midlands Air Operations Unit was a consortium of West Midlands, Warwickshire, West Mercia and Staffordshire Police based at Birmingham Airport. It operated from July 1987, until it was replaced by the After experimenting, since the 1970s, with civilian helicopters hired on an occasional basis, West Midlands Police launched their own air unit on 10 May 1989. A WMP helicopter was destroyed by arson in June 2009, while at Birmingham Airport.

==== Airport policing ====
The West Midlands Police force area includes Birmingham Airport which is on the Solihull LPA. The airport has a dedicated airports policing team assigned who work closely with Border Force customs and immigration officers. Officers working at the airport have additional powers under the Terrorism Act 2000 as the airport is "designated" under the terms of the Act and some are armed.

==== Central Motorway Police Group (CMPG) ====
West Midlands Police is one of the two police forces who contribute officers to the Central Motorway Police Group, the other being Staffordshire Police. CMPG operate out of their main headquarters under the M6 motorway at Perry Barr at which their central control room and vehicle depot is situated. CMPG also have a regional control centre in Quinton, Birmingham shared with National Highways. Officers attached to CMPG cover a wide geographical area, including in the West Midlands the M6, M54 and A45.

The CMPG has been disbanded recently, ending the collaboration which consisted of Staffordshire Police and West Midlands Police. Both forces have introduced larger Roads Policing Departments in their own force areas to tackle road related offending.

==== Counter Terrorism Policing West Midlands (CTPWM) ====
Based in Birmingham, Counter Terrorism Policing West Midlands (CTPWM) is responsible for co-ordinating the force's counter-terrorism activity. CTPWM works under the guidance of the Government's national counter terrorism strategy, CONTEST, with the aims of pursuing terrorists, protecting the public, preparing for a possible attack and preventing terrorism by working in the community to address the causes of terrorist activity.

==== Dog Section ====
Most dogs in the West Midlands Police Dog Section are products of an in-house breeding program which the force has been running at its Balsall Common training centre since 1994.

Specialist search dogs including Springer Spaniels and Labradors are also used by the Dogs Unit to locate drugs or firearms and explosives. Dogs are continually recruited from rescue centres and from members of the public. All specialist dogs are handled by officers who already have a general purpose police dog, giving the handler responsibility in both training and operational deployment.

Prior to 2013 there were 69 operational dog handlers working in West Midlands Police, dogs underwent an initial training program lasting twelve weeks. Officers with the Dog Section patrol in specially adapted Skoda patrol vehicles with air conditioned cages capable of carrying up to three dogs in the rear and operate from bases at Aston, Canley and Wednesbury.

==== Events planning and football ====
The events planning department has responsibility for co-ordinating large-scale events taking place within the force area and also for ensuring that officers are available should they be required to support other regional forces through mutual aid arrangements. One major responsibility of the department is organising the policing operation for the Autumn political party conferences that are often held at the International Convention Centre in Birmingham. Included within this department also is the Football Unit who coordinate policing of football games within the West Midlands and operate a team of "spotters" to identify violent supporters and banned individuals.

The policing of large-scale events such as football matches, VIP visits and public demonstrations can be coordinated from the force's Events Control Suite (ECS) at the Tally Ho facility in Birmingham. The ECS is able to receive live CCTV footage and has computer facilities for the use of partner agencies with whom the suite is shared.

==== Firearms ====
West Midlands Police operate a number of armed response vehicles (ARVs) that patrol the region and respond to incidents typically involving guns, knives or dangerous dogs. Officers undertake a ten-week selection process to join the firearms unit with courses being delivered on weapons, tactics and advanced driving.

Alongside attending firearms incidents, officers attached to the firearms unit also provide tactical advice when planning operations and give lectures on firearms awareness to officers and members of the public. The force also has a Firearms Licensing Department which is responsible for the issue of shotgun and firearms certificates to members of the public and explosives certificates to companies requiring them.

==== Major Crime Unit ====
Detached from the LPAs, Major Crime is staffed by officers holding a detective qualification and investigate serious and complicated crimes not taken on by Local CID or other departments. Such offences include murders, attempt murders, firearms offences and kidnaps.

Major Crime is arranged into a series of investigation teams including a dedicated Homicide Unit, working from Aston.

As well as the Homicide and Reactive Team managing these major investigations, the Unit has a Proactive element which has responsibilities for managing investigations locate and apprehend offenders wanted for the most serious offences.

The introduction of the County Lines Task Force has seen a renewed focus on drugs supply across the force and further afield. The CLTF have also safeguarded a number of young people at risk of exploitation.

Also working within Major Crime are a series of Payback Teams who are responsible for arranging asset seizures and confiscations under the Proceeds of Crime Act 2002. During 2011 offenders were forced to pay back £6.3M from proceeds of crime, a 39% increase on the previous year.

==== Road Policing Department ====
Based at Park Lane, Chelmsley Wood and Wednesbury, the force traffic unit had responsibility for roads policing on all roads inside the West Midlands other than the motorways which are covered by the Central Motorways Policing Group, but since its disbanding the newly bolstered RPD also covers this element of the road network. Officers from the RPD usually hold advanced driving grades and have access to marked and unmarked vehicles, including BMWs and Audis fitted with evidential video recording equipment. Road Policing is supported by a Collision Investigation Unit based at Aston Police Station who investigate accidents involving fatalities or life-changing injuries.

==== Forensic scene investigators (FSI) ====
Officers are supported by a team of around 100 civilian forensics scene investigators who attend crime scenes and examine seized items to obtain forensic evidence for use in court. Formerly known as scenes of crime officers (SOCO), scene investigators have access to a wide range of specialist equipment to help with their role and alongside gathering forensic samples; they also are responsible for crime scene photography.

==== Intelligence unit ====
West Midlands Police has dedicated intelligence cells based on each LPU who collate and disseminate information collected by officers from a range of other sources. This role involves "sanitising" intelligence logs and forwarding them on to relevant persons, receiving information from outside sources such as Crimestoppers, and assisting with the progression of investigations.

The intelligence unit is responsible for organising briefing material for officers and police leadership; they also include a covert operations unit, who coordinate undercover policing operations under the terms of the Regulation of Investigatory Powers Act 2000 (RIPA).

West Midlands Police is a partner alongside Warwickshire Police, West Mercia Police and Staffordshire Police in the Regional Intelligence Unit collaborative working agreement under which information is shared between the forces on serious and organised criminals affecting the West Midlands Region.

==== Integrated emergency management (IEM) ====
The Operations Integrated Emergency Management service is responsible for ensuring that the force is ready to respond to major incidents, that business continuity plans are in place and that the force's duty under the Civil Contingencies Act 2004 is satisfied. This work includes running exercises and drills to test readiness and working closely with other emergency services and local authorities. As part of the service's work, the force also maintains a number of Casualty Bureau facilities at which calls from the public are taken and collated following a major incident such as a plane crash or terrorist attack.

==== Local CID ====
Each LPU has a Local CID team of officers who hold a detective qualification and conduct secondary investigations into serious offences that occur within their area. Offences that fall under the remit of Local CID include burglary of dwellings, personal robberies, frauds and some vehicle crime.

==== Offender management unit (OMU) ====
All LPAs have an offender management unit (OMU) who work with partner agencies to concentrate on the offenders living on their areas identified as being particularly difficult or damaging. Offenders who fall into this category include those designated as prolific and other priority offenders (PPOs), drug users, violent criminals and young criminals.

Officers from the OMU manage their assigned PPOs under two strands. One consists of rehabilitation and resettlement under which partner agencies are involved in an effort to halt re-offending whilst the other consists of catching and convicting offenders who have been identified as not participating in rehabilitation programmes or are wanted for outstanding crimes.

==== Operational support unit (OSU) ====
Working from Park Lane the operational support unit is a team of officers specially trained in areas including Public Order policing, method of entry and searching. Officers working with the OSU are typically deployed as part of a "serial" of one sergeant and seven officers and have access to specialist equipment and vehicles including armoured land rovers.

==== Public protection unit (PPU) ====
The public protection unit (PPU) investigates reports of sexual assaults and incidents involving children and vulnerable people. PPU is split between adult and child investigations, is responsible for safeguarding and works with partner agencies such as social services and domestic violence charities. As with CID, most officers working in the PPU hold a detective qualification.

==== Safer travel ====
The safer travel team is a collaboration between West Midlands Police, the British Transport Police and CENTRO, focusing on criminal activity occurring on the public transport network. The team is composed of officers and PCSOs who patrol trains, buses and trams in the region.

The Partnership, the first of its type in the country, also has access to around 1,000 CCTV cameras which are located at bus, rail and metro stations, park and ride sites and in bus shelters. The dedicated control centre is staffed 24 hours a day to spot and respond to incidents.

=== Professional standards department (PSD) ===
Based at Lloyd House, the professional standards department (PSD) is responsible for the recording and assessment of public complaints about police officers, police staff or special constables. PSD also has a role in investigating serious reports of misconduct and corruption involving members of the force.

Members of the public are eligible to make a complaint if the behaviour about which they want to complain was directed towards them, if they were "adversely affected" by said behaviour or if they were an eyewitness to said behaviour. A person is "adversely affected" if they suffer any form of loss or damage, distress or inconvenience, if they are put in danger or are otherwise unduly put at risk of being adversely affected.

PSD work alongside the Independent Office for Police Conduct (IOPC), to whom they will refer the most serious allegations.

Where appropriate, PSD have a range of outcomes following disciplinary panels, including no action, counselling (management advice), written warning, transfer to another post, withholding increments and dismissal.

West Midlands Police recorded 501 complaints for 2018/19, a 36 percent drop in comparison to 2017/18 during which 777 complaints were recorded.

=== Press Office ===
Also known as Corporate Communications, the West Midlands Police Press Office is centralised at headquarters and is charged with representing the force's public image. Each LPU has dedicated Territorial Communications officers and in addition to addressing media enquiries, the Press Office also looks after the force's website and publishes the force's internal online newspaper, News Beat.

==== Social media ====
West Midlands Police maintains a presence on social media websites including Twitter, Facebook, Flickr, YouTube and blogging platforms.

Several of the force's social media accounts have won recognition as examples of best practice, including Solihull Police's Twitter feed which came first place in the 2012 Golden Twits' Customer Service category and Inspector Brown's Mark Hanson Digital Media Award 2012 for his mental health blog.

=== Special constabulary ===
Officers belonging to the special constabulary have the same powers as full-time officers and are unpaid volunteers, giving a minimum of sixteen hours a month of duty time.

After initial training special constables are deployed wearing the same street uniform as other officers. They can be identified as Specials by their collar numbers, which start with 7 and the 'SC' on their epaulettes.

Special constables provide West Midlands Police with around 96,000 hours of voluntary duty each year and usually work alongside regular officers on neighbourhood teams, response teams and also Community Action & Priority Teams.

== PEEL inspection ==
Her Majesty's Inspectorate of Constabulary and Fire & Rescue Services (HMICFRS) conducts a periodic police effectiveness, efficiency and legitimacy (PEEL) inspection of each police service's performance. In its latest PEEL inspection, West Midlands Police was rated as follows:

	Outstanding	Good	Adequate	Requires Improvement	Inadequate
2021 rating		Preventing crime; Recording data about crime; Treatment of the public; Disrupting serious organised crime; Good use of resources	Responding to the public; Managing offenders; Developing a positive workplace	Investigating crime; Supporting victims; Protecting vulnerable people	

== Recruitment and training ==
Applicants to join West Midlands Police as police officers are subject to a staged recruitment process designed to assess their suitability for the role, including background checks, medical and fitness tests.

On being accepted to join the force, new recruits undergo an initial training course last eighteen weeks which is non-residential and based mainly in the classroom but with periodic practical exercises and attachments. Performance is assessed by a series of examinations and training includes self-defence lessons and tuition on police computer systems. Following successful completion of initial training, recruits are then tutored on their LPUs for nine weeks before being signed off for independent patrol. They retain their status as student officers for a period of two years from their joining date during which they are required to maintain a record of their development. Upon reaching two years service, student officers are "confirmed" in their rank by a senior officer, usually their LPU commander.

The recruitment process for PCSOs is similar to that of police officers although training periods are reduced.

In November 2018 it emerged that the police force had blocked white male officers from promotion, setting aside half of all promotion slots for women and ethnic minority candidates in seven out of eight of the year's promotion rounds. In the year's final round the force continued to discriminate, by blocking white male applicants for two days. A complaint by the Police Federation union noted that the practice was illegal and condemned it as "not fit for purpose". As a result West Midlands Police "paused" the practice.

On 11 June 2020, West Midlands Police and Crime Commissioner David Jamieson committed to ensuring that the force recruits 1,000 new Black, Asian and minority ethnic police officers over the following three years to make the force look more like the communities it serves.

== Presentation ==
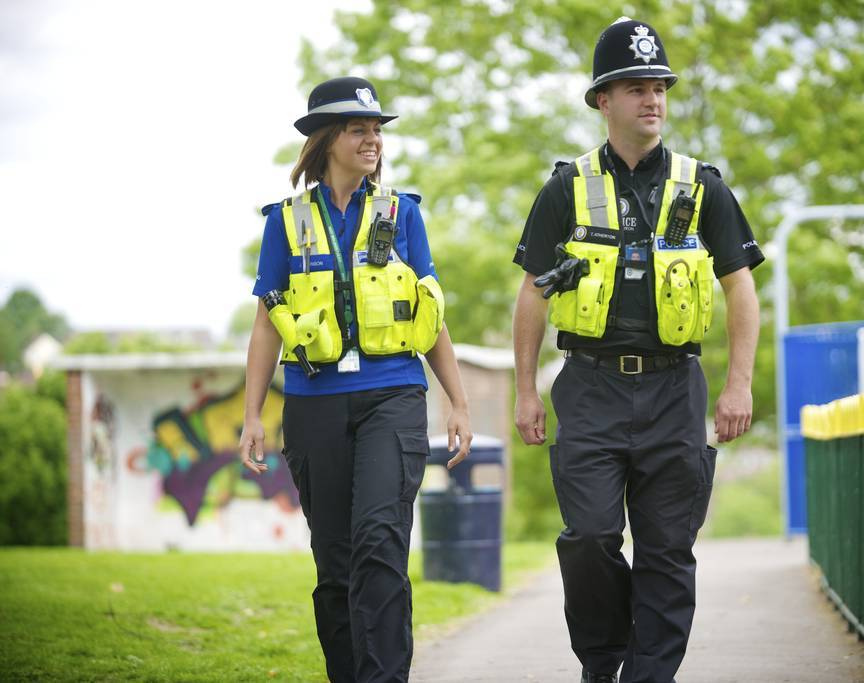
A female police community support officer, left, and a male police officer wearing typical street uniforms of West Midlands Police

Police officers working for West Midlands Police have a wide range of different uniforms, equipment and vehicles dependent on their specific roles.

=== Uniform ===
Officers' standard street uniform consists of black lightweight zip-up shirts, black trousers and a high visibility protective vest. White shirts were replaced by the black T-shirts in 2010 at a cost of £100,000 but are retained for court and station duties. Officers are issued with fleeces, weatherproof pullovers, fluorescent jackets, high visibility tabards, waterproof over trousers and slash resistant gloves.

==== Ranks and epaulettes ====
Shoulder insignia for ranks above police constable are as follows:

West Midlands Police warranted officer ranks

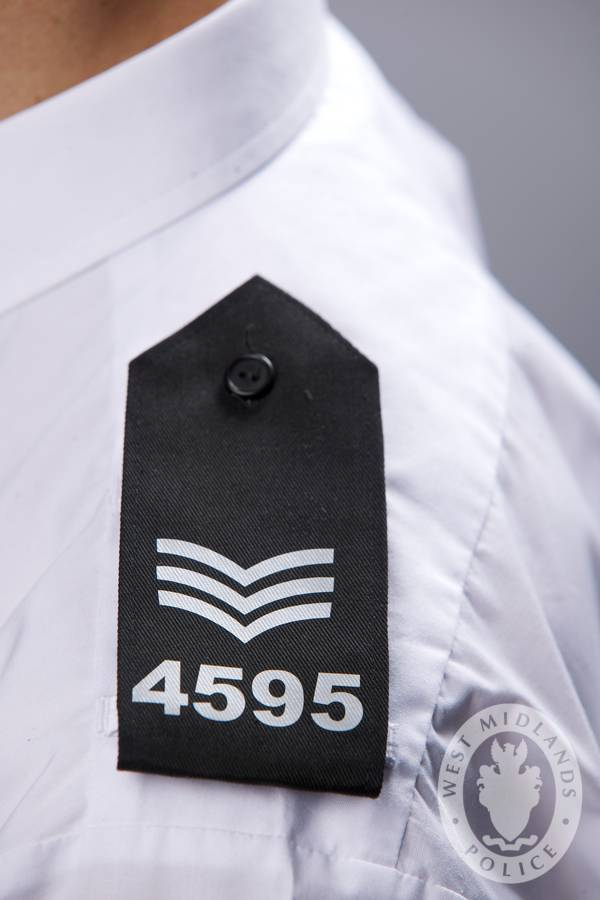
Sergeant

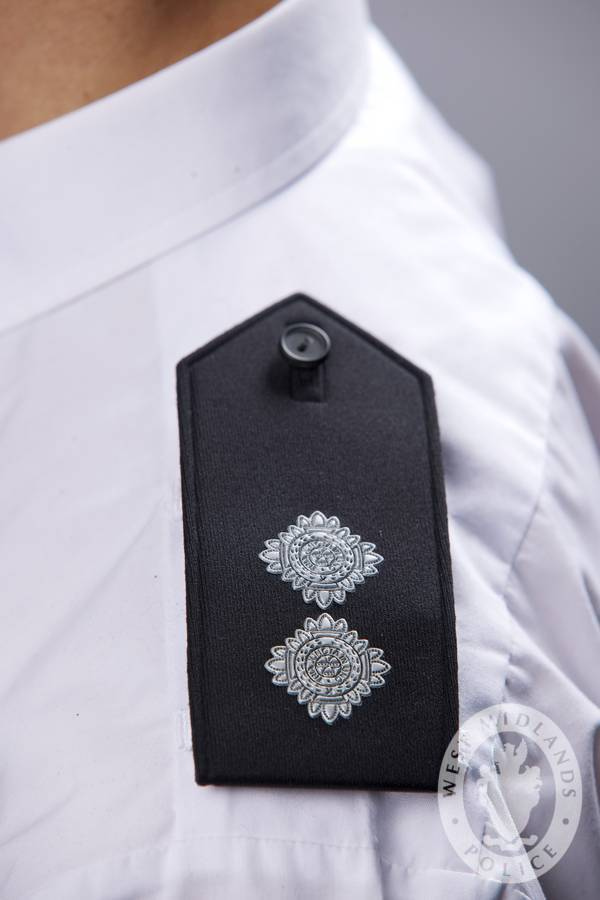
Inspector

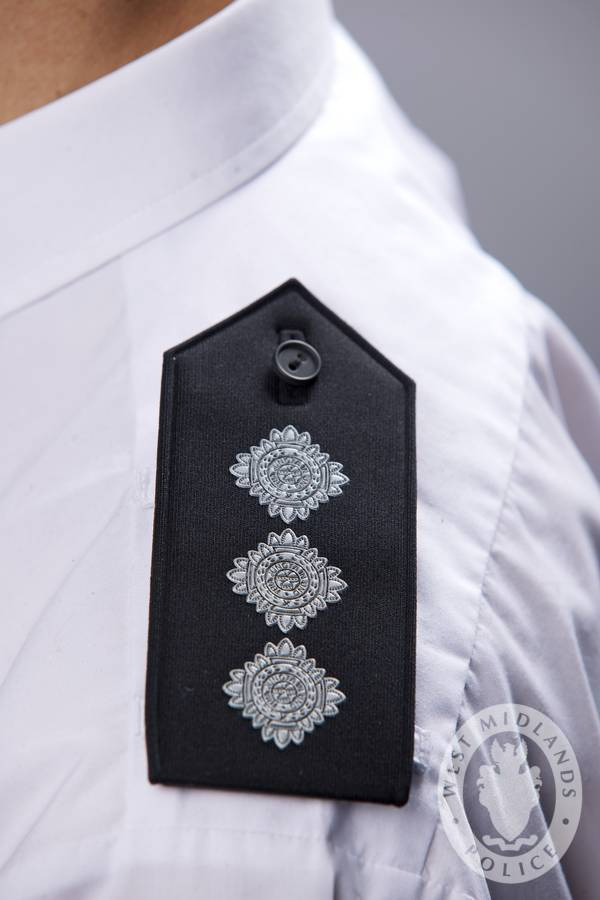
Chief Inspector

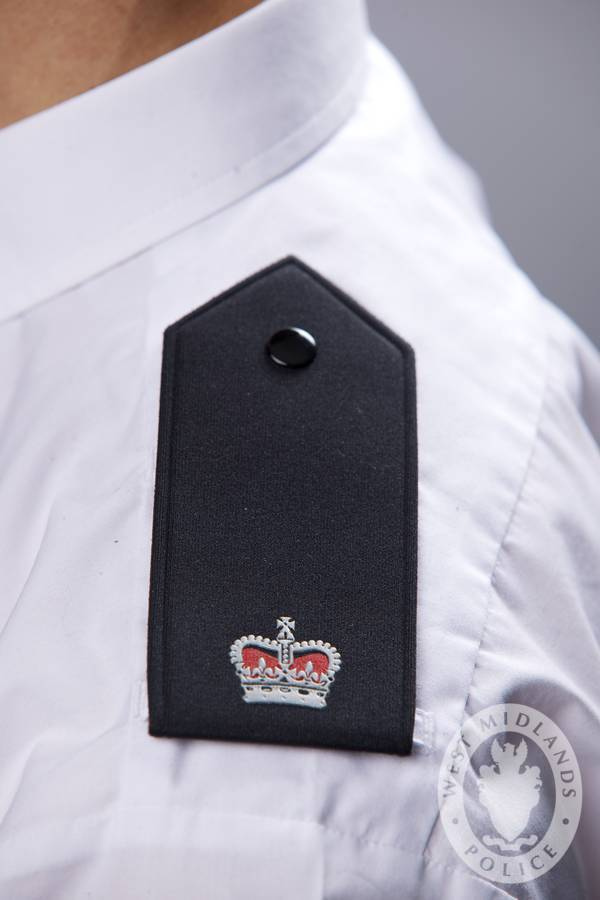
Superintendent

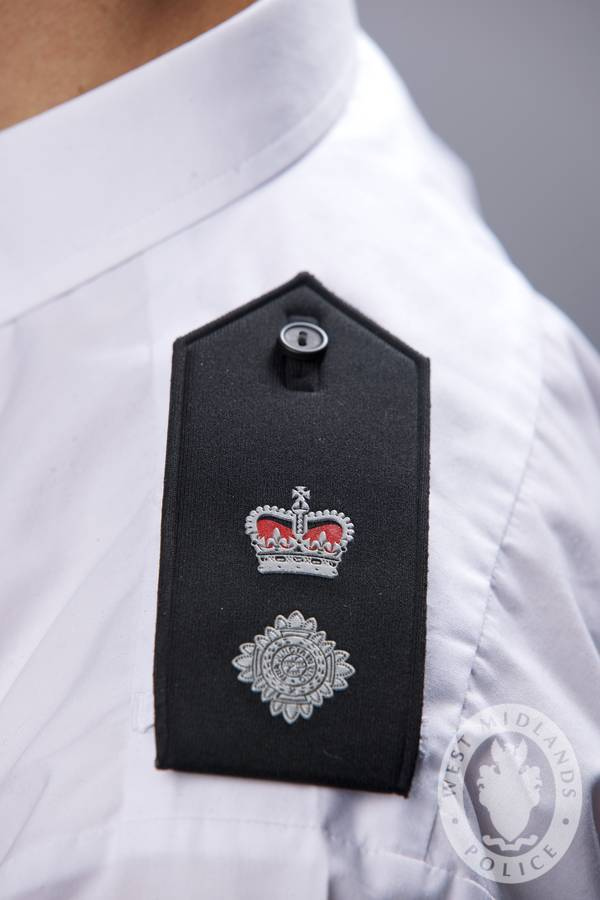
Chief Superintendent

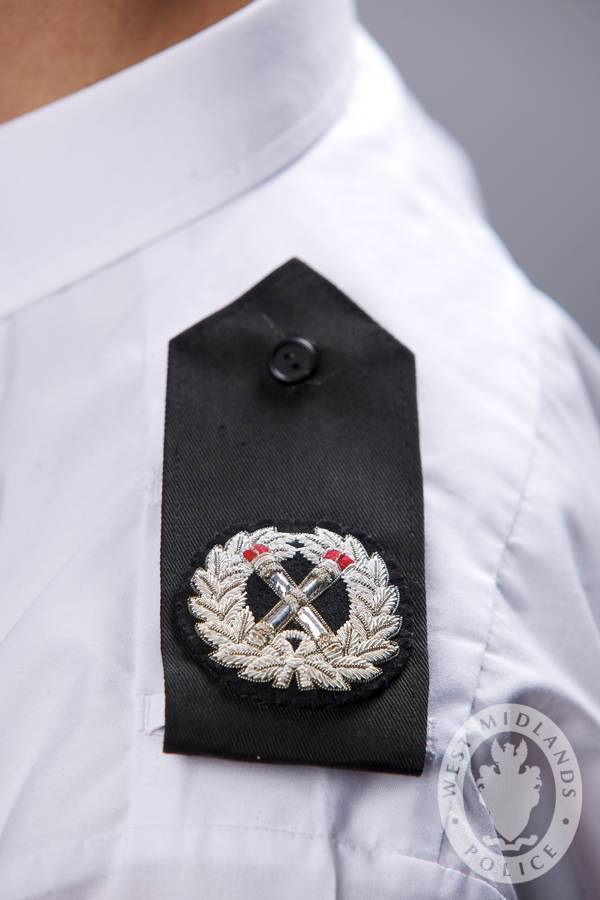
Assistant Chief Constable

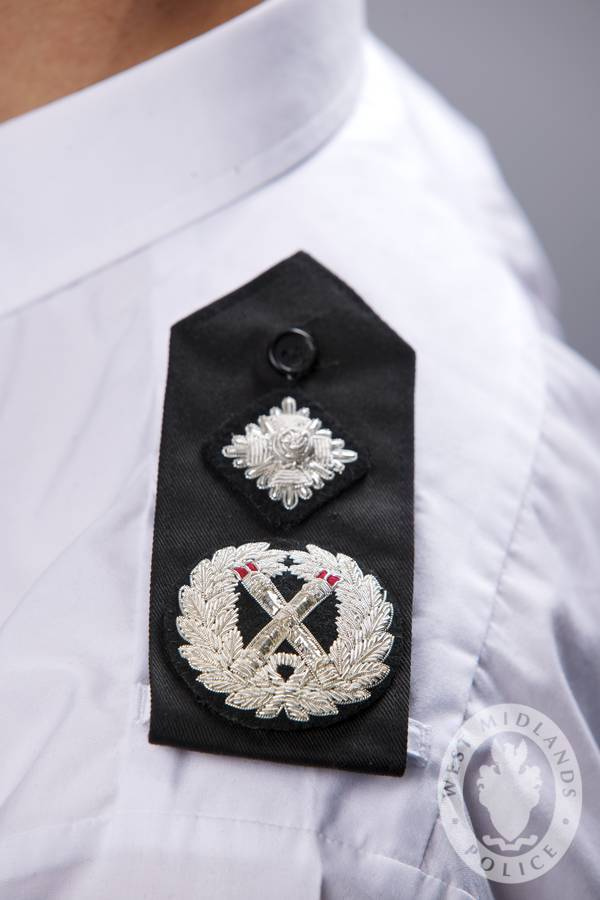
Deputy Chief Constable

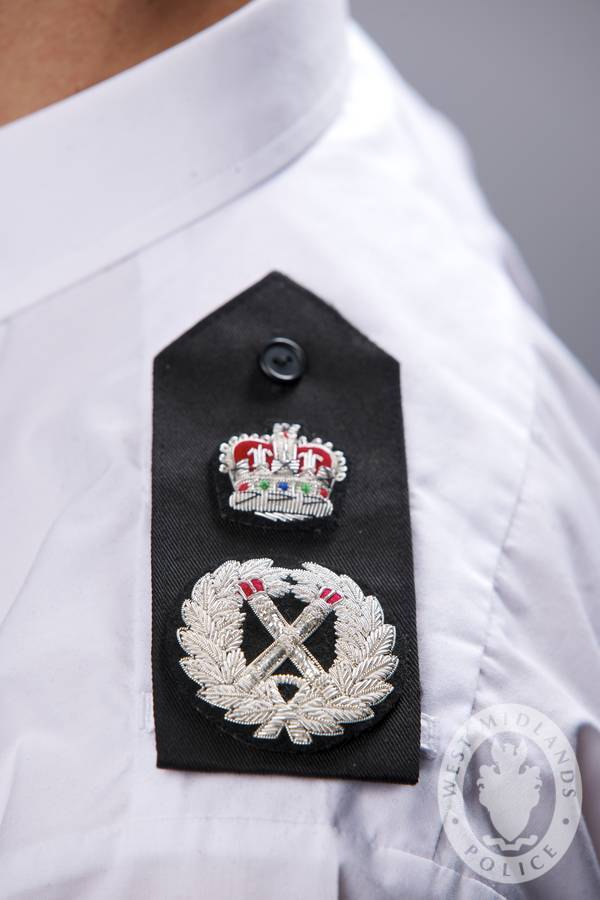
Chief Constable

When dressed for public order policing, officers wear coloured epaulettes indicating their respective roles. Bronze commanders wear yellow epaulettes, inspectors wear red epaulettes, sergeants wear white epaulettes, tactical advisors wear blue epaulettes, medics wear green epaulettes and evidence gathering officers have orange epaulettes.

=== Equipment ===
As part of standard issue Personal Protective Equipment (PPE), officers carry Sepura TETRA radios, rigid handcuffs, PAVA spray and an extendible friction lock baton. Officers also have access to first aid kits, limb restraints and torches.

Traffic units, particularly officers performing collision investigation duties, use laser plotting devices to accurately survey collision sights and carry devices that can be used to measure road friction and deceleration values.

== Facilities ==
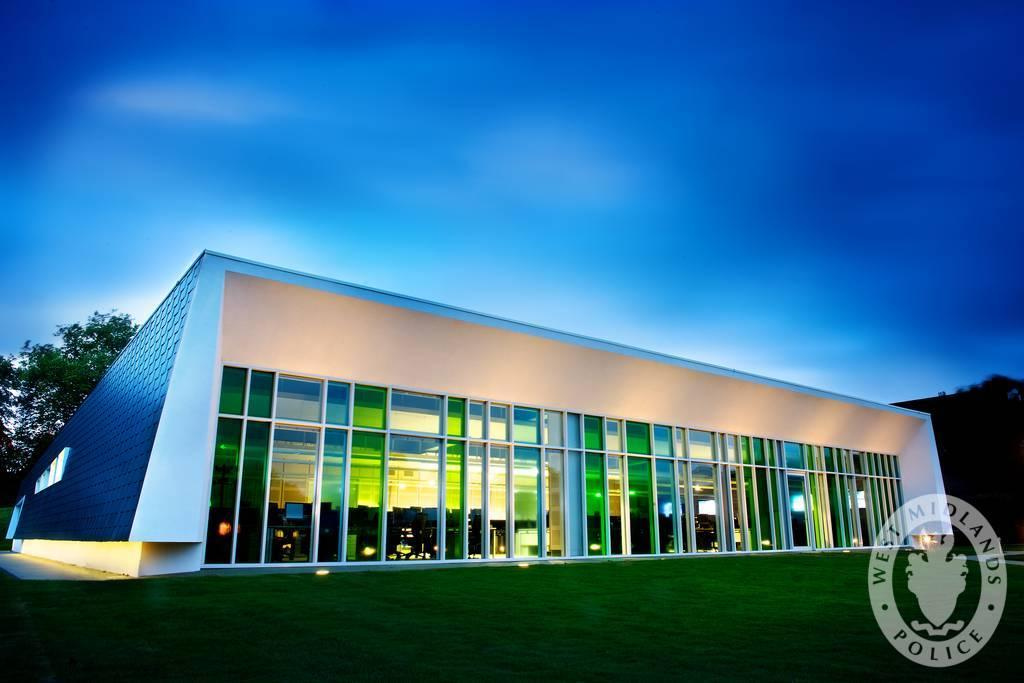
The Events Control Suite

As of 2021, there are 11 police stations, with a front desk in the West Midlands Police force area, including Lloyd House in Birmingham, the force headquarters. There are also two 'superblock' custody suites in the West Midlands.

The NPAS helicopter operates from a base at Birmingham Airport in Solihull.

Large scale policing demonstrations such as protest marches and football matches were coordinated from the Events Control Suite (ECS) in Birmingham. Since that time the force has built a new purpose built Command Centre which contains the Force Control Room as well as hosting a number of other departments.

Public Order courses are hosted at the regional training centre which consists of a converted aircraft hangar on the RAF Cosford site near Telford. The site has facilities allowing officers to experience riot situations including dealing with 'Emotionally Disturbed Person' scenarios during which they are subject to attacks by role playing actors wielding weapons.

West Midlands Police operate a Custody Visiting Scheme under which independent representatives from local communities are able to access detention facilities to observe, comment and report upon the welfare and treatment of detained persons. Visits are conducted at random by volunteers working in pairs who then write a report on the feedback gathered during their visit.

In 2017 a joint inspection of the force's custody suites was conducted by HMIC and Her Majesty's Chief Inspector of Prisons.

== Associations ==
=== West Midlands Police Federation ===
The West Midlands Police Federation is a part of the Police Federation of England and Wales, which is the representative body for every police officer below the rank of superintendent. Representatives of the Federation are elected for three year terms and must be serving police officers.

Police officers are restricted by their regulations from striking and from taking part in active politics, hence the Federation represents their interests and negotiates on their behalf in relation to pay, conditions and pensions.

The Federation is funded by a monthly subscription paid from officers' salaries and provides representation and advice to officers who are subject to disciplinary processes.

=== West Midlands Police Benevolent Fund ===
The West Midlands Police Benevolent Fund was set up in 1974 following the amalgamation of local forces to form West Midlands Police. The fund is financed by subscriptions from members and donations and monies are distributed on application to the committee to members suffering financial hardship.

== Notable incidents and investigations ==
- 21 November 1974: Birmingham Pub Bombings: twenty-one people killed and one hundred and eighty two injured after devices exploded in the Mulberry Bush and Tavern in the Town pubs in Birmingham City Centre. Investigation by the West Midlands Serious Crimes Squad; six convicted but later compensated for wrongful imprisonment.
- 19 October 1978: murder of Carl Bridgewater: investigation by the West Midlands Serious Crimes Squad; four convicted but later released and compensated for wrongful imprisonment.
- 1989: review of South Yorkshire Police following the Hillsborough Disaster: force called in to investigate South Yorkshire officers' conduct after the 1989 stadium crush. West Midlands discovered that South Yorkshire Police had altered 164 witness statements and alleged that they pressured and bullied witnesses to change their statements about the disaster.
- July 1996: Wolverhampton machete attack.
- 2 January 2003: murder of Letisha Shakespeare and Charlene Ellis in a gang-related drive-by machine-gunning.
- 28 July 2005: Birmingham tornado: officers involved in rescue and recovery operation following a tornado touching down in Sparkbrook.
- 22 October 2005 – 23 October 2005: Handsworth riots: race riots in Handsworth and Lozells on two consecutive nights, following rumours of an alleged gang rape of a teenage black girl by a group of South Asian men. One member of the public died as a result of stab wounds and a police officer was shot and wounded.
- 2007: Operation Gamble: a plot by British Pakistanis in Birmingham to kidnap and behead a British Muslim soldier. Eight homes and four businesses were raided after an investigation involving intelligence services and other police forces. The investigation led to nine arrests; six were charged.
- 2010: Papal visit to the United Kingdom: large policing operation to assist with security measures during Pope Benedict XVI's visit to the United Kingdom, which included a Mass of Beatification in Cofton Park and dinner at St Mary's College, Sutton Coldfield.
- 6 August 2011 – 10 August 2011: England riots: large-scale disorder across England affecting the centres of Birmingham, Wolverhampton and West Bromwich, following the death of Mark Duggan.
- 2012: London Olympic Games: officers from across the West Midlands were involved in policing events in the region and were deployed on mutual aid to help other forces.
- April–July 2013: attempted Mosque bombings and murder of Mohammed Saleem.
- May 2018 – March 2020: Birmingham bathing cult.
- 17 June 2020 – 4 December 2021: murder of Arthur Labinjo-Hughes.
- 28 July – 8 August 2022: policing the XXII Commonwealth Games.
- 2025 banning of Maccabi Tel Aviv supporters from match with Aston Villa, leading to multiple investigations of the force's decision-making and use of evidence and the retirement of Chief Constable Craig Guildford.

== See also ==
- Law enforcement in the United Kingdom
- List of law enforcement agencies in the United Kingdom
- Table of police forces in the United Kingdom
- West Midlands Fire Service
- West Midlands Ambulance Service
