= 2025 ban of Maccabi Tel Aviv fans in Birmingham =

Policing scandal in the UK

In October 2025, the Birmingham City Council banned the supporters of Israeli football club Maccabi Tel Aviv F.C. from a Europa League fixture against English side Aston Villa F.C. on 6 November 2025. The ban was imposed by the council's Safety Advisory Group on the advice of West Midlands Police, citing public safety concerns. The decision was condemned by the UK government and opposition, but not overturned.

After the match, it emerged that false evidence had been used by the police to justify the decision. Multiple investigations have been launched into the decision to ban the Israeli fans and the intelligence underpinning it, and police repeatedly had to apologise after giving false information to a parliamentary committee. The use of artificial intelligence tools by the police came under scrutiny after inaccurate AI-generated claims were included in police intelligence.

Chief Constable Craig Guildford of West Midlands Police retired after giving false information to parliament, amid calls for him to resign or be dismissed. The government announced policing reforms including restoring the power of Home Secretaries to dismiss chief constables of British police forces.

== Background ==
Football teams Aston Villa F.C. and Maccabi Tel Aviv F.C. were scheduled to play each other on 6 November 2025 at Aston Villa's home stadium of Villa Park in Birmingham. The fixture was part of the group stages of the Europa League, one of UEFA's club competitions.

Following a reported rise in antisemitism in the United Kingdom, on the 2 October 2025, an attack on a synagogue in Manchester left two Jewish worshippers dead and four more injured.

== Decision to ban Maccabi Tel Aviv fans ==
In the weeks before the match, police and local authorities coordinated regarding safety and policing arrangements for the match. On the 16 October, Birmingham City Council's Safety Advisory Group announced that supporters of Maccabi Tel Aviv would not be allowed to attend the game, citing public safety and security concerns. West Midlands Police classified the fixture as high risk, citing "current intelligence" as well as "previous incidents", referring to the November 2024 Amsterdam riots.

Days after the ban was announced, a derby match between Maccabi Tel Aviv and Hapoel Tel Aviv was called off due to rioting and the throwing of pyrotechnics and smoke grenades from the stands before kickoff, causing dozens of injuries. The disorder was widely referenced in commentary on the ban, with MP Ayoub Khan saying that it vindicated the safety concerns about the presence of Maccabi Tel Aviv fans. Maccabi CEO Jack Angelides insisted that his club’s fans had not been to blame for the disturbances.

=== Initial responses ===
The decision to bar Maccabi Tel Aviv supporters from the match prompted criticism from across the UK political spectrum. Prime Minister Keir Starmer described the ban as the "wrong decision", and that authorities should ensure "all football fans can enjoy the game", while leader of the opposition Kemi Badenoch described the ban as a "national disgrace". The ban was also criticised by the Liberal Democrat and Reform UK parties.

The ban was supported by independent MP Ayoub Khan, whose constituency includes the Villa Park stadium where the match was held. Khan had previously launched a petition calling for West Midlands Police to cancel the match. He cited safety concerns around Maccabi fans' behaviour and moral objections to the Gaza war to support the ban. The Green Party also supported the ban.

UK government ministers offered extra policing resources and support in order to facilitate Maccabi fans' attendance, but police insisted that the ban was necessary.

Israeli foreign minister Gideon Sa'ar described the decision to ban Israeli football fans as "shameful" and called on UK authorities to reverse it.

Following the initial criticism of the ban, West Midlands' police and crime commissioner Simon Foster called for the Safety Advisory Group to review its decision, but stressed that the decision remained with the SAG and the police. The city council said that a review of the decision would only happen if the police's risk assessment were to change.

Maccabi Tel Aviv announced that even if the ban were reversed it would decline any allocation of away tickets for the match, stating that "the wellbeing and safety of our fans is paramount". In its statement, the club said that "safety of our fans wishing to attend very much in doubt" due to "hate-filled falsehoods".

== Police use of evidence ==
Police intelligence focussed on the danger posed by fans of Maccabi Tel Aviv, who were portrayed by West Midlands Police as "uniquely violent". However, minutes from the meeting of the Safety Advisory Group which took the decision to ban the Maccabi fans showed police support the decision despite "the absence of intelligence".

It later emerged that police had fabricated claims about past incidents involving Maccabi Tel Aviv, used AI-hallucinated details in their evidence justifying the ban and concealed evidence that the local Muslim community posed a threat to the visiting fans.

=== Amsterdam riots ===
Police intelligence given to the Safety Advisory Group had concluded that the greatest risk was posed by extremist fans of Maccabi Tel Aviv. West Midlands Police said that their Dutch counterparts had told them that the November 2024 Amsterdam riots had been instigated by Maccabi fans, who had attacked Muslims at random, requiring 5,000 Dutch police officers to be deployed to quell the unrest. Though the intelligence was not initially released, police did say that the decision was due to the risk of hooliganism from travelling Maccabi fans.

After West Midlands Police's intelligence assessment was leaked, accounts relating to Maccabi fans' presence in Amsterdam were contradicted by Dutch national police. A spokesman for the Amsterdam division of the Dutch police said that some claims were "incorrect", "meaningless" and that the number of officers deployed was far lower than what West Midlands had claimed. In January 2026, leaked documents showed that police had originally shared with the Safety Advisory Group the Dutch police's figure of 1,200 officers deployed in Amsterdam.

West Midlands Police continued to stand by their assessment, and claimed that the Dutch police were denying the intelligence due to political pressure from the Mayor of Amsterdam. Amsterdam Mayor Femke Halsema and the Inspector-General of the Netherlands Inspectorate of Justice and Security (which oversees the police) also subsequently disputed West Midlands Police's account of the 2024 riots in Amsterdam, saying that the facts were "generally well-known" before the decision to ban Maccabi fans from the Aston Villa match.

A Home Affairs Select Committee report later wrote that inaccurate information relating to the events in Amsterdam had originated with queries by West Midlands police officers to Microsoft Copilot, and was then passed on to the SAG and to MPs on the Home Affairs Committee.

=== Threat from locals to Israeli and Jewish fans ===
The Secretary of State for Culture, Media and Sport, Lisa Nandy, said after the decision to ban away fans was publicised that the police's risk assessment was "based in no small part on the risk posed to those fans that are attending to support Maccabi Tel Aviv because they are Israeli and because they are Jewish". Maccabi CEO said in November that while the police’s reasons for the ban had not been reported, he believed it was due to "concern that the safety of the Maccabi fans coming here would be at risk. That must be the main reason." West Midlands Police insisted that the threat from the fans was the "predominant" reason for the ban, and not the threat of antisemitic violence.

In January, it was reported that West Midlands Police had been in possession of high confidence intelligence since September about locals in the West Midlands who wished to "arm themselves" and target Maccabi fans. Chief Constable Craig Guildford told MPs that the police had not disclosed this intelligence before because MPs had never specifically asked about it.

=== Fictitious West Ham match ===
West Midlands Police's intelligence presented to the Security Advisory Group also included reference to a football match between West Ham United and Maccabi Tel Aviv played the year before. It was pointed out in evidence to the Home Affairs Select Committee by the government's independent advisor on antisemitism Lord Mann that this match had in fact never happened.

Chief Constable Craig Guildford of West Midlands Police accepted that the match hadn't happened, blaming its inclusion on "social media scraping" as part of the force's intelligence gathering. Asked by the select committee whether it could be an AI hallucination, Guildford denied this. It later emerged in Sir Andy Cooke's interim report that the match was included as a result of use of Microsoft Copilot, an AI tool. Guildford sent a written apology to MPs, saying that he had had "no intention to mislead the committee."

== Police engagement with local communities ==
=== Jewish community ===
In response to political commentary that the decision to ban Maccabi fans amounted to antisemitism, West Midlands Police sought to explain to local Jewish communities that the decision was based on the threat of hooliganism. After Dutch police had denied the veracity of West Midlands Police's intelligence, a member of Birmingham's Jewish community related that the community had been told by police that Maccabi fans "were militarily trained, that they overpowered the Dutch police and how the Israeli hooligans were the worst they’d ever seen."

During questioning by the Home Affairs Select Committee on the 1 December, Assistant Chief Constable Mike O'Hara repeatedly told MPs that Jewish community representatives had objected to the presence of Maccabi Tel Aviv fans in the city. O'Hara subsequently wrote to representatives of the Jewish community in Birmingham to apologise as "no community members had told police they supported the ban". It subsequently emerged that the only formal meeting with the Jewish community took place after the decision to ban the fans had already been made.

=== Muslim community ===
Concerns were raised about the mosques consulted by West Midlands Police during community engagement ahead of the decision. Eight mosques were consulted, of which three had previously hosted speakers promoting anti-Semitic conspiracy theories or calling for the death of Jews, prompting questions about the appropriateness of those consultations. Shadow Justice Secretary Nick Timothy accused the police of fabricating the evidence used to justify the ban "at the behest of Islamists".

== Investigations ==
West Midlands Police said that it commissioned a "peer review" of the decision to ban away fans, which was conducted on the 20 October, four days after the ban was announced, by the United Kingdom Football Policing Unit. The review did not raise problems with the decision to ban Maccabi fans.

On 31 October 2025, Home Secretary Shabana Mahmood commissioned a review of the decision by His Majesty's Inspectorate of Constabulary and Fire & Rescue Services, Sir Andy Cooke. On 27 November, as doubts had emerged about the intelligence provided by West Midlands Police, she asked him to specifically examine that issue.

The decision was also probed by the Home Affairs Select Committee of the House of Commons. Senior police officers gave oral evidence twice to the select committee, on 1 December 2025 and 6 January 2026. After their first appearance, committee chair Karen Bradley wrote to West Midlands Police due to false evidence they had given, warning them of the dangers of lying to parliament. In mid-December after their initial testimony was deemed insufficient, police were recalled to the select committee on 6 January 2026. Guildford later wrote to the committee apologising for giving misleading evidence, as he had denied that police had used artificial intelligence tools in the preparation of its intelligence.

On 21 December 2025, over one hundred MPs and Peers from all the major parties wrote to the Independent Office for Police Conduct asking it to investigate West Midlands Police’s decision to ban the away fans. Though the IOPC normally is called to investigate by the police force itself, in December its director Rachel Watson was considering using the body's "power of initiative" to open an investigation without being asked by West Midlands Police. After the publication of Sir Andy Cooke's report, the IOPC reiterated that it had not received any police conduct referrals from West Midlands Police and again raised the possibility that it would use its "power of initiative" to start an investigation.

On the 19 January, the IOPC announced it would investigate the decision to ban Maccabi fans, and on the same day Police and Crime Commissioner Simon Foster referred Craig Guildford's conduct to the IOPC to investigate. On 26 August 2026, the Independent Office for Police Conduct announced that in addition to Guildford, the IOPC is investigating a senior officer who led the compilation of the police evidence, and two other senior serving officers and a staff member. The IOPC said in a statement that "some people serving with the police may potentially have behaved in a manner that could justify disciplinary proceedings", and that Guildford and others may have committed gross misconduct.

=== Findings ===
Cooke provided an interim report in January 2026 which found that West Midlands Police had overstated the threat posed by Maccabi fans and understated the threat to them. The report also criticised the force for failing to consult with Birmingham’s Jewish community before the decision, though it noted that it had not found evidence that the force’s decision was driven by antisemitism. Following Guildford's retirement with immediate effect, acting Chief Constable Scott Green described the Cooke's findings as "damning".

In February 2026, the Home Affairs Committee's report was released. The committee found that the use of AI had been disclosed internally before senior officers denied its use on 6 January, though they didn't accuse the former chief constable of deliberately misleading Parliament, noting he hadn't been told that it had generated the false material. The committee's report said that the government had received advance warning of the ban and could have prevented it.

== Aftermath ==
=== Political reaction ===
After Dutch police called West Midlands Police's intelligence into question, Conservative MP Nick Timothy said that Craig Guildford must either justify the force's actions or resign. Timothy went on to lead some of the criticism of West Midlands Police. In January 2026, Timothy was named Shadow Justice Secretary, with Conservative leader Kemi Badenoch citing his campaigning on the Maccabi ban in her announcement of his appointment.

By the end of November, MPs of different parties, as well as West Midlands Police and Crime Commissioner Simon Foster were asking Chief Constable Guildford for clarification on West Midlands Police's evidence. By the middle of December, over a hundred UK parliamentarians had written that they "do not have confidence in West Midlands Police’s ability to investigate its own actions".

In January, senior West Midlands Police appeared at the Home Affairs Select Committee again. Committee members were outraged by parts of police's new testimony in that meeting, and leader of the opposition Kemi Badenoch accused police of misleading the committee and presenting "an inversion of reality". At the same hearing, Birmingham City Council leader John Cotton refused to say whether he had confidence in Chief Constable Guildford. After the hearing Reform UK leader Nigel Farage called for Guildford's immediate resignation, accusing him of spreading "misinformation".

After receiving findings from Sir Andy Cooke's investigation, Shabana Mahmood declared that she no longer had confidence in Guildford, stating that it had been "20 years since a Home Secretary last made such a statement". After statements by Culture Secretary Lisa Nandy, Health Secretary Wes Streeting and Mahmood calling for Guildford's resignation, Sir Keir Starmer's office clarified that he also had no confidence in the Chief Constable. West Midlands Mayor, Richard Parker, and Birmingham City Council leader John Cotton also called for Guildford to resign.

Independent MP Ayoub Khan continued to defend West Midlands Police intelligence as doubts about it emerged. He described the calls for Guildford's resignation as a "witch-hunt".

=== Retirement of Craig Guildford; other calls for resignations ===
Shadow Home Secretary Chris Philp called on January 14 for Shabana Mahmood to dismiss Guildford. Mahmood contended that she did not have the power to do so, though she intended to restore the power to dismiss Chief Constables to Home Secretaries.

Police and Crime Commissioner Simon Foster was urged by the Jewish Leadership Council and the Board of Deputies of British Jews to dismiss Guildford "without delay". Foster refused to do so, preferring to wait for further reports from Sir Andy Cooke and the Home Affairs Select Committee. However, on 16 January Guildford announced his retirement with immediate effect, citing the "political and media frenzy".

Subsequently, Lord Austin, an independent peer in the House of Lords, called for other senior West Midlands officers involved in the decision to depart their positions. He specifically named Assistant Chief Constable Mike O’Hara and Chief Superintendent Tom Joyce as individuals who should go. The Campaign Against Antisemitism called for the resignation of Simon Foster, after he did not dismiss Guildford and alleging "an institutional problem within the force". Nick Timothy and Wendy Morton, a Conservative MP in the West Midlands also called for Foster's resignation.

=== Policing reforms ===
On Friday 23 January, Shabana Mahmood announced a range of proposed reforms to the police, including giving Home Secretaries the power to compel retirement, resignation or suspension of chief constables.

In the West Midlands, the new Acting Chief Constable Scott Green pledged that West Midlands Police would work to rebuild relations with the Jewish community, including a promise to investigate every report of an antisemitic incident. He blocked access for staff to Microsoft Copilot until appropriate policy and guidelines could be put into place. The Acting Deputy Chief Constable Jennifer Mattinson stated that the West Midlands Police would roll out antisemitism training to its officers.

== See also ==
- Stop The Game
