= Edward Crew =

Edward Crew may refer to:

- Edward Crew (RAF officer) (1917–2002), English officer and flying ace
- Edward Crew (police officer) (born 1946), English chief constable
