= Paul Scott-Lee =

British police officer

Sir Paul Joseph Scott-Lee is a retired British police officer who served as chief constable of Suffolk Constabulary and West Midlands Police.

== Early life and career ==
Scott-Lee was born in Coventry, and educated at Whitley Abbey Comprehensive School. Scott-Lee joined Warwickshire and Coventry Constabulary on direct from school, and on amalgamation of local forces to form the West Midlands Police in 1974, he rose to the rank of Chief Inspector.

Promoted to Superintendent in 1988 in Northamptonshire Police, he became an area commander and latterly allocated to headquarters on both corporate planning and quality assurance. He then became assistant chief constable in August 1992 in Kent Constabulary, responsible for all personnel and training matters.

On 1 September 1994 he became deputy chief constable of Suffolk Constabulary. Awarded the Queen's Police Medal in the 1997 New Year Honours, he was promoted to chief constable on 2 October 1998.

== Chief Constable of the West Midlands ==
Scott-Lee was appointed chief constable of the West Midlands Police in September 2002.

Shortly after his appointment to the post, he had to deal with the gang slayings of Letisha Shakespeare, 17, and Charlene Ellis, 18, who were shot outside a hair salon in Aston, Birmingham, England, on 2 January 2003.

He was knighted in the 2007 Queen's Birthday Honours.

In March 2008, after the legal outcomes were confirmed of Operation Gamble, Scott-Lee commented that "Terrorism is with us for the next 20 years." In the same month, Scott-Lee was appointed to head the official police inquiry into the death of Michael J. Todd, the former chief constable of the Greater Manchester Police.

Police appointments
| Preceded by Edward Crewe | Chief Constable of the West Midlands; 2002–2009 | Succeeded by Christopher Sims |
