= Operation Safeguard =

Operation Safeguard may refer to:

- Operation Safeguard (United States), 2025
- Operation Safeguard (United Kingdom), 2006
