= Philip Knights, Baron Knights =

English police constable and Chief Constable of West Midlands Police

The Right Honourable The Lord Knights CBE, QPM, DL
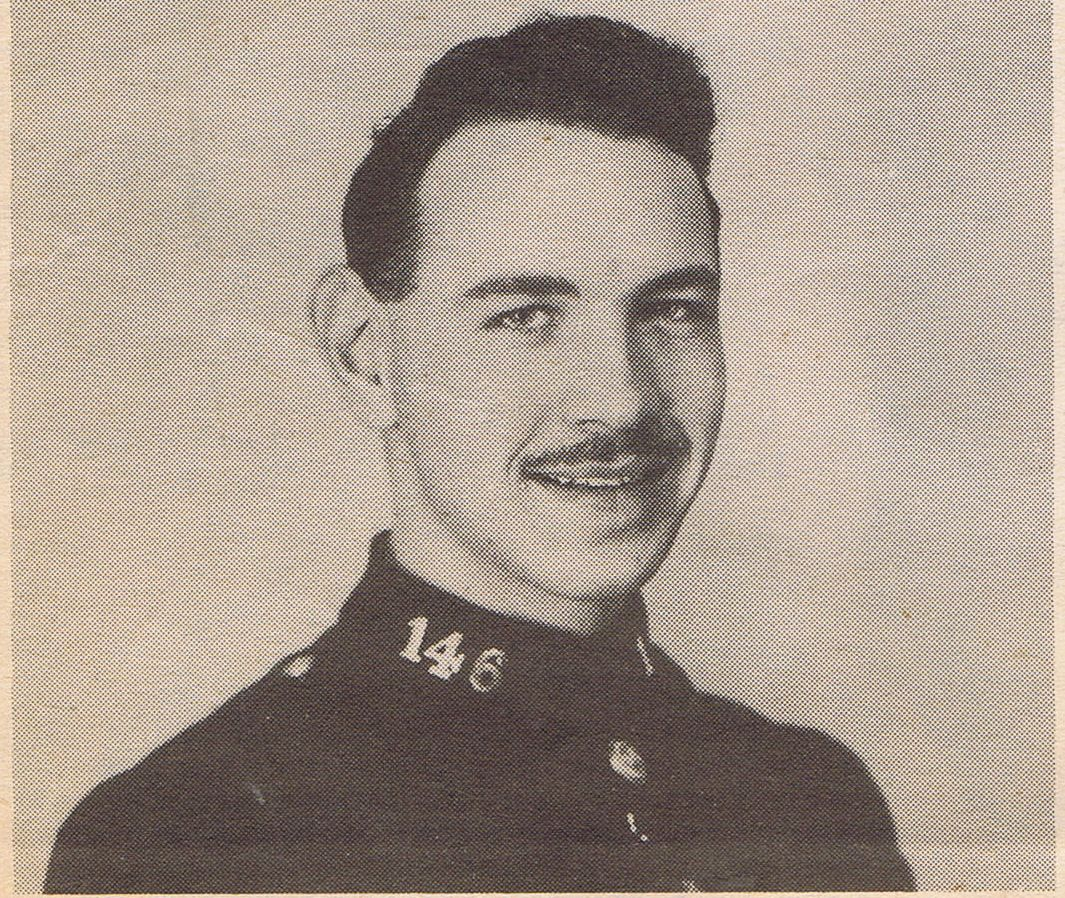
- Born: Philip Douglas Knights; 3 October 1920
- Died: 11 December 2014 (aged 94)
- Education: East Grinstead Co School, King's School
- Alma mater: Police Staff College, Grantham
- Occupation: Chief constable
- Employer: West Midlands Police
- Spouse: Jean Knights (deceased)

Member of the House of Lords
- Lord Temporal
- Life peerage 22 July 1987 – 11 December 2014

Philip Douglas Knights, Baron Knights (3 October 1920 – 11 December 2014) was an English police officer who served as Chief Constable of West Midlands Police, succeeding West Midlands Police's first Chief Constable, Sir Derrick Capper.

== Career ==
Knights joined Lincolnshire Police as a Cadet in 1938, becoming a Constable in 1940 and completed training at the (now defunct) Police Staff College in Grantham, Lincolnshire. During World War II, he served in the Royal Air Force between 1943 until 1945. Knights returned to Lincolnshire Police, reaching the rank of Chief Superintendent in 1957. He moved to the Birmingham City Police in 1959 as an Assistant Chief Constable and rose to the rank of Deputy Chief Constable in 1970. In 1972 he moved to Sheffield and Rotherham Constabulary as Chief Constable. In 1974, Sheffield and Rotherham Constabulary amalgamated with parts of West Yorkshire Constabulary to become South Yorkshire Police. Knights returned to West Midlands Police where he was appointed Chief Constable. He was described as a 'true architect' of the new force, bringing together six separate forces into one.

=== Controversy ===
In 1983 the Campaign for Nuclear Disarmament activist Madeline Haigh criticised Knights for not disciplining West Midlands Special Branch who investigated her after she wrote to a local newspaper complaining about the cancellation of a peace march. Knights defended the case by saying it "fell within the terms of reference of the Special Branch."

== Honours and awards ==
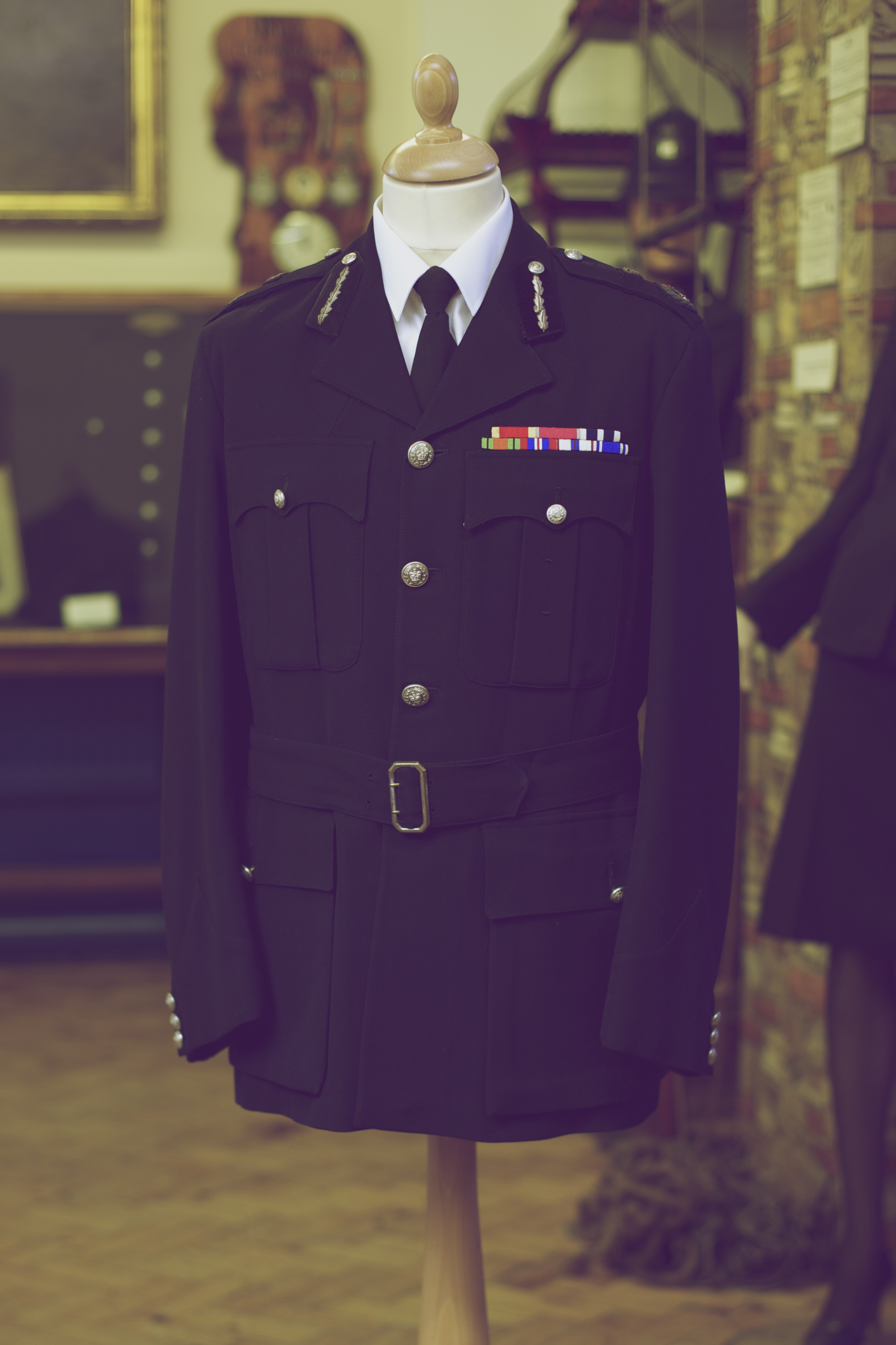
Knights' uniform as Chief Constable

Knights was awarded the Queen's Police Medal in 1964 and then appointed an Officer of the Order of the British Empire (OBE) in 1971. Knights was promoted to a Commander (CBE) in 1976 and knighted in 1980. He was deputy lieutenant of the West Midlands in 1985 and was created a life peer on 22 July 1987 as Baron Knights, of Edgbaston in the County of West Midlands, the first police officer so ennobled who had not been a Commissioner of the Metropolitan Police. He sat as a crossbencher in the House of Lords until his death in 2014.

Knight Bachelor	1980
Commander of the Order of the British Empire (previously Officer)	1976 (1971)
Queen's Police Medal	1964
Defence Medal	1945
War Medal 1939–1945	1945
Queen Elizabeth II Silver Jubilee Medal	1977
Police Long Service and Good Conduct Medal	1972

== Personal life ==
Knights was vice-president of the Warwickshire County Cricket Club, the Birmingham County Scout Council and the Birmingham Federation of Clubs for Young People, and first patron of the Police History Society. He had a considerable interest in classical music and was the patron of the British Police Symphony Orchestra from 1997 until his death. The orchestra had been formed in 1989 by Police Constable Alexander Roe of West Midlands Police.

His spouse was Jean Knights.

Police appointments
Preceded by Derrick Capper	Chief Constable of the West Midlands; 1975–1985	Succeeded by Geoffrey Dear
