= The Leaving Trains =

American indie rock band

- Origin: Los Angeles, California
- Genres: indie rock, punk rock, post-punk
- Years active: 1980–2001
- Labels: Enigma Records, SST Records
- Past members: James Moreland; Chris Whitey Sims; Sylvia Juncosa; Manfred Hofer; Tom Hofer; Hillary Laddin

The Leaving Trains were an American indie rock band from Los Angeles, California. The Leaving Trains were founded in 1980 by singer "Falling" James Moreland, and the band became known for high-energy if chaotic performances that earned comparisons to The Replacements. The Leaving Trains released a total of ten albums, mostly on SST Records, and Moreland became known for cross dressing in traditionally female clothing and cosmetics, before coming out as a transgender woman but still using the name James. The band broke up in about 2001.

== Career ==
Falling James had previously been a member of punk rock bands the Mongrels and the Downers before assembling the group with guitarist Manfred Hofer, bassist Tom Hofer, keyboardist Sylvia Juncosa and drummer Hillary Laddin. They played locally for three years, with a handful of drummers, before releasing their first album, Well Down Blue Highway, in 1984 with Terry Graham on drums.

Following their Kill Tunes LP (1986) for SST Records, Mike Barnett and Eric Stringer replaced the Hofer brothers in the group's lineup. Next came Fuck (SST, 1987),Transportational D. Vices (SST, 1988), and the Loser Illusion EP. In 1989 Falling James was married to Courtney Love for a short while. In 1991 Moreland briefly disbanded The Leaving Trains to form The Power of Sky.

Along with Power of Sky's bassist, Whitey Sims, Moreland reassembled Leaving Trains with a new lineup including Bobby Belltower (who had briefly played in the previous incarnation of the band) and Lenny Montoya. This lineup produced the album The Lump in My Forehead (recorded 1992, released 1993), but later in 1992 Chaz Ramirez (also known as a producer of such bands as Social Distortion and Stryper) and Dennis Carlin took over on bass and drums, respectively. Ramirez died on December 2, 1992, of injuries sustained when an attic floor collapsed underneath him. Some of his recordings with the Trains were posthumously released in 1994 on the album The Big Jinx. Moreland was subsequently kicked out of the group. She went on to form a new band under the same name with Melanie Vammen (formerly of The Muffs and The Pandoras) on keyboards, Jimmy Green on Bass, and Allen Clark on drums. This lineup yielded Smoke Follows Beauty in 1997.

The Leaving Trains' last studio album, Emotional Legs, features a variety of musicians, including Clark, Green, Vammen (now on guitar), Dennis Carlin, Maddog Karla, Miss Koko Puff, and Andrew Buscher. Emotional Legs was released on Steel Cage Records in 2001. The Leaving Trains, that same year, would also do their final live performance at The Knitting Factory in Hollywood as a backup band for Australian punk pioneer Rob Younger, performing songs Younger had done with Radio Birdman and The New Christs. In 2005, Steel Cage Records released a live Leaving Trains album called Amplified Pillows. That year also saw a brief band reunion of Moreland with Manfred and Tom Hofer, and 1985 drummer Hunter Crowley.

Moreland occasionally wrote for L.A. Weekly until 2020, and no longer performs music.

== Members ==
Original lineup

- James Moreland - vocals
- Manfred Hofer - guitar
- Tom Hofer - bass
- Sylvia Juncosa - keyboards
- Hillary Laddin - drums

Later members

- Jim Barnett - Drums
- John Lacques - Drums
- Terry "Dad Bag" Graham - Drums
- Chris Wahl - Drums
- Jason Kahn - drums
- Hunter Crowley - drums
- Eric Stringer - bass
- Mike Barnett - guitar
- Bobby Belltower - guitar
- Sam Merrick - guitar
- Lenny Montoya - drums
- Aaron "Mo-Ron" Donovan- on guitar
- Chris Whitey Sims - vocals, bass and guitar
- Chaz Ramirez - bass
- Dennis Carlin - drums
- Melanie Vammen - guitar
- Jimmy Green - bass
- Jack Rabid - drums
- Allen Clark - drums
- John Anglim - drums
- Miss Koko Puff - bass
- Bruce Gunnell - drums

== Discography ==
=== Studio albums ===
- Well Down Blue Highway (Bemisbrain/Enigma Records, 1984)
- Kill Tunes (SST Records, 1986)
- Fuck (SST, 1987)
- Transportational D. Vices (SST, 1988)
- Sleeping Underwater Survivors (SST, 1991)
- Loser Illusion Pt. 0 EP (SST, 1991)
- The Lump in My Forehead (SST, 1993)
- The Big Jinx (SST, 1994)
- Drowned and Dragged EP (SST, 1995)
- Smoke Follows Beauty (SST, 1997)

=== Compilation albums ===
- Keats Rides A Harley compilation (Happy Squid, 1981)
- Warfrat Tales compilation (Warfrat, 1983)
- Enigma Variations compilation (Enigma, 1985)
- Favorite Mood Swings compilation (SST, 1998)
- Emotional Legs (Steel Cage, 2001)
- Amplified Pillows (Steel Cage Records)
