= Murder of Charlene Ellis and Letisha Shakespeare =

Shooting in Birmingham, England

Coordinates: 52.50767°N 1.90253°W

- Location: Birchfield Road, Aston, Birmingham, England
- Date: 2 January 2003
- Attack type: Drive-by shooting
- Weapon: MAC-10 machine pistol
- Deaths: 2
- Injuries: 2
- Perpetrators: Marcus Ellis, Michael Gregory, Nathan Martin, Rodrigo Simms
- Motive: Revenge for the murder of Yohanne Martin

Two teenage girls, Charlene Ellis, 18, and Letisha Shakespeare, 17, were shot with a MAC-10 machine pistol, outside a hair salon in Birchfield Road, Aston, Birmingham, England, as they were leaving a party in the early hours of 2 January 2003, in a gang-related drive-by shooting. Shakespeare and Ellis were described as "best friends" and "innocent victims".

Charlene's twin sister Sophie, cousin Cheryl Shaw and a friend, Leon Harris, were also injured. Shaw was shot in the hand.

The shooting, investigated by the West Midlands Police under its new Chief Constable, Paul Scott-Lee, was part of a feud between two Birmingham gangs, the "Johnson Crew" and the "Burger Bar Boys", and was in response to the murder of Yohanne Martin, a Burger Bar Boys associate.

Four men were each convicted of murder and attempted murder at Leicester Crown Court in March 2005. Marcus Ellis, 24 (Charlene's half-brother), Michael Gregory, 22, and Nathan Martin, 26 (brother of Yohanne), were jailed for a minimum of 35 years. Rodrigo Simms, 20, was sentenced to 27 years – the lesser figure being due to his age at the time of the shooting. The trial was the first in England at which secret witnesses were allowed to be used. In 2005, the convicted men appealed at Woolwich Crown Court but the appeal was turned down. They were also refused leave to appeal to the House of Lords. In 2012, Ellis, Martin and Simms appealed to the European Court of Human Rights that they had not received a fair trial. This appeal was also dismissed.

The mothers of the two dead women, Marcia Shakespeare and Beverley Thomas, have since actively campaigned against gun crime and gangs. They set up the 'Letisha and Charlene Education Awards', administered by the Birmingham & Black Country Community Foundation, a registered charity, in 2006. In December 2016 it was announced that Marcia Shakespeare had been appointed a Member of the Most Excellent Order of the British Empire (MBE) in the 2017 New Year Honours.

In 2018, Libera, an Italian association that promotes outreach activities and various types of protest action against organised crime, remembered Letisha and Charlene among other nearly 900 names of innocent victims of organised crime during the 23rd Day of Remembrance and Commitment.
