= Kill Tunes =

Studio album by Leaving Trains
- Released: 1986
- Genre: Indie rock
- Label: SST

Leaving Trains chronology
Well Down Blue Highway (1984)	Kill Tunes (1986)	Fuck (1987)

Kill Tunes is the second album by the American indie rock band Leaving Trains. It was released in 1986 via SST Records. The band supported the album with a North American tour.

== Production ==
"Private Affair" is a cover of a song by the Saints. Kill Tunes is the last album on which the Hofer brothers played. "10 Generations" addresses themes of authenticity and selling out.

== Critical reception ==
Professional ratings
Review scores
Source	Rating
AllMusic	4/5 stars
Robert Christgau	B+
Lincoln Journal Star	3.5/5 stars
The Philadelphia Inquirer	4/4 stars
Record-Journal	B
Reno Gazette-Journal	3.5/5 stars

Trouser Press wrote that frontman Falling James Moreland "displays his boozehound-next-door humor for the first time on “A Drunker Version of You,” and it provides a welcome respite from the vitriol sprayed elsewhere." The Los Angeles Times thought that "it's one narrow line between convoluted and eclectic, and Leaving Trains walks it, bends it and ties it into knots." The Reno Gazette-Journal determined that "the guitar attack is reminiscent of the Clash in their heyday."

Robert Palmer, in The New York Times, declared: "The album title is apt; Mr. Moreland writes the songs, then the band assaults them with well-placed jabs, hard riffing, chaotically celebratory vocals and sheer energy"; Palmer later listed Kill Tunes as the third best album of 1986. The Providence Journal opined that "Kill Tunes does smack of revival, but not of stale rehash."

AllMusic wrote that "the album mixes soft ballads, high-octane rave-ups, and furious rock played with endearing jangle, roaring bar chords, and catchy pop hooks." Spin listed the album as one of the 80 "excellent" underground rock albums of the 1980s.

== Track listing ==
No.	Title	Length
1.	"Light Rain"	2:26
2.	"She's Looking at You"	2:32
3.	"Private Affair"	2:04
4.	"Cigarette Motel"	1:22
5.	"10 Generations"	3:39
6.	"Kinette"	3:29
7.	"A Drunker Version of You"	2:29
8.	"Black"	1:54
9.	"Falling"	2:11
10.	"Vicki"	2:02
11.	"Terminal Island"	2:22
12.	"Warning Track"	2:26
