= Dave Thompson (police officer) =

Chief Constable of West Midlands Police from 2016 to 2022

Chief Constable Sir Dave Thompson QPM DL
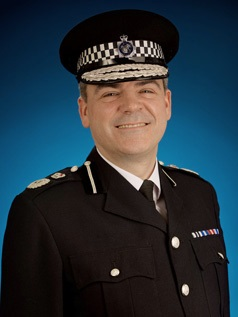
- Thompson in 2016

Chief Constable of West Midlands Police
- In office 9 January 2016 – 5 December 2022
- Preceded by: Christopher Sims
- Succeeded by: Craig Guildford

Personal details
- Education: University of Liverpool
- Awards: QPM

Sir David Thompson QPM DL is the former chief constable of West Midlands Police, England's second-largest and the United Kingdom's third-largest police force. He retired from the post on 5 December 2022, succeeded by Craig Guildford.

== Police career ==
=== Greater Manchester Police ===
Thompson joined Greater Manchester Police (GMP) in 1990. During his career with GMP he served at every rank, starting as a constable in North Manchester. He worked on the Manchester Olympic bid and led work on New Deal for East Manchester. He commanded the main policing operations for the 2002 Commonwealth Games at the City of Manchester Stadium including the opening and closing ceremonies. He was also commander for central Manchester, policing the diverse communities of Moss Side and Longsight.

In 2007 he was appointed an assistant chief constable of GMP and at various times led policing portfolios for Operations, Local Policing, Crime, Information Technology and Terrorism. At a national level he led the 2010 review of National Counter Terrorism structures.

=== West Midlands Police ===
In 2010, Thompson became deputy chief constable for West Midlands Police (WMP) and oversaw the force’s change programme.

Since 2011, he has led the National Gangs portfolio and the Criminal use of Firearms portfolio, where he leads the UK’s response to gun crime. In 2015, he became the NPCC lead for Finance.

In January 2016, he was appointed chief constable and set the strategic direction for the force within the police and crime commissioner’s plan. Later in January he published his vision for the force - preventing crime, protecting the public, and helping those in need.

Thompson said more people ask for help from the police because cuts across public services generally mean more vulnerable people were involved with the police. He maintains West Midlands Police does not always have the resources to provide the service the public wants and expects due to budget cuts and cuts in the number of police officers, also due to increase in crime including modern slavery and gang crime. Thompson said, "The level of calls we're receiving this summer [summer 2018] are very challenging [and] sometimes that service that we're providing [at] those peak times doesn't meet what the public expect. I get that. Sometimes that service will be a poor service, sometimes actually the service is what we can and say we will offer, and sometimes that might not always be what the public want to see." Thompson also wrote, “The government has had a partial view of policing in the last few years. It was very interested in terrorism and high-end threats but less focused on local crimes, which had been left for forces and police and crime commissioners to manage amid steep budget cuts. This more local agenda has many positives in setting priorities but it has come with steep budget reductions and a widening mission. There has been a real-term reduction of police budgets of 19% since 2010, but ranging between 11- 25% across forces. (...) Crime is rising and so is the demand on our service. The calls do not get answered as quickly as they did. Officers are not as fast at responding to emergencies and more crimes are dealt with on the phone. Fewer high-volume crimes like thefts are investigated and as a result fewer offenders brought to justice. The visibility and proactivity of neighbourhood policing is much reduced. (...) The NAO [National Audit Office] assesses the government did not fully understand the actual impact of these cuts on police forces. Policing is at the tipping point – and we need to move on from here.”

Thompson retired from the force on 5 December 2022, and was succeeded as chief constable by Craig Guildford.

== Honours ==

Ribbon	Description	Notes
	Knight Bachelor	2021 New Year Honours List; For Services to Policing
	Queen's Police Medal (QPM)	2014 New Year Honours List
	Queen Elizabeth II Golden Jubilee Medal	2002; UK version of this medal
	Queen Elizabeth II Diamond Jubilee Medal	2012; UK version of this medal
	Queen Elizabeth II Platinum Jubilee Medal	2022; UK version of this medal
	Police Long Service and Good Conduct Medal	

- He has served as a Deputy Lieutenant for the county of the West Midlands since 31 March 2020. This gives him the right to the post-nominal letters "DL" for life.
- in 2022, he was awarded an honorary doctorate by Staffordshire University.

== Personal life ==
He graduated in law from Liverpool University in 1990.

Police appointments
Preceded by Christopher Sims	Chief Constable of the West Midlands; 2016–2022	Succeeded by Craig Guildford
