= Derrick Capper =

Sir William Derrick Capper CStJ QPM
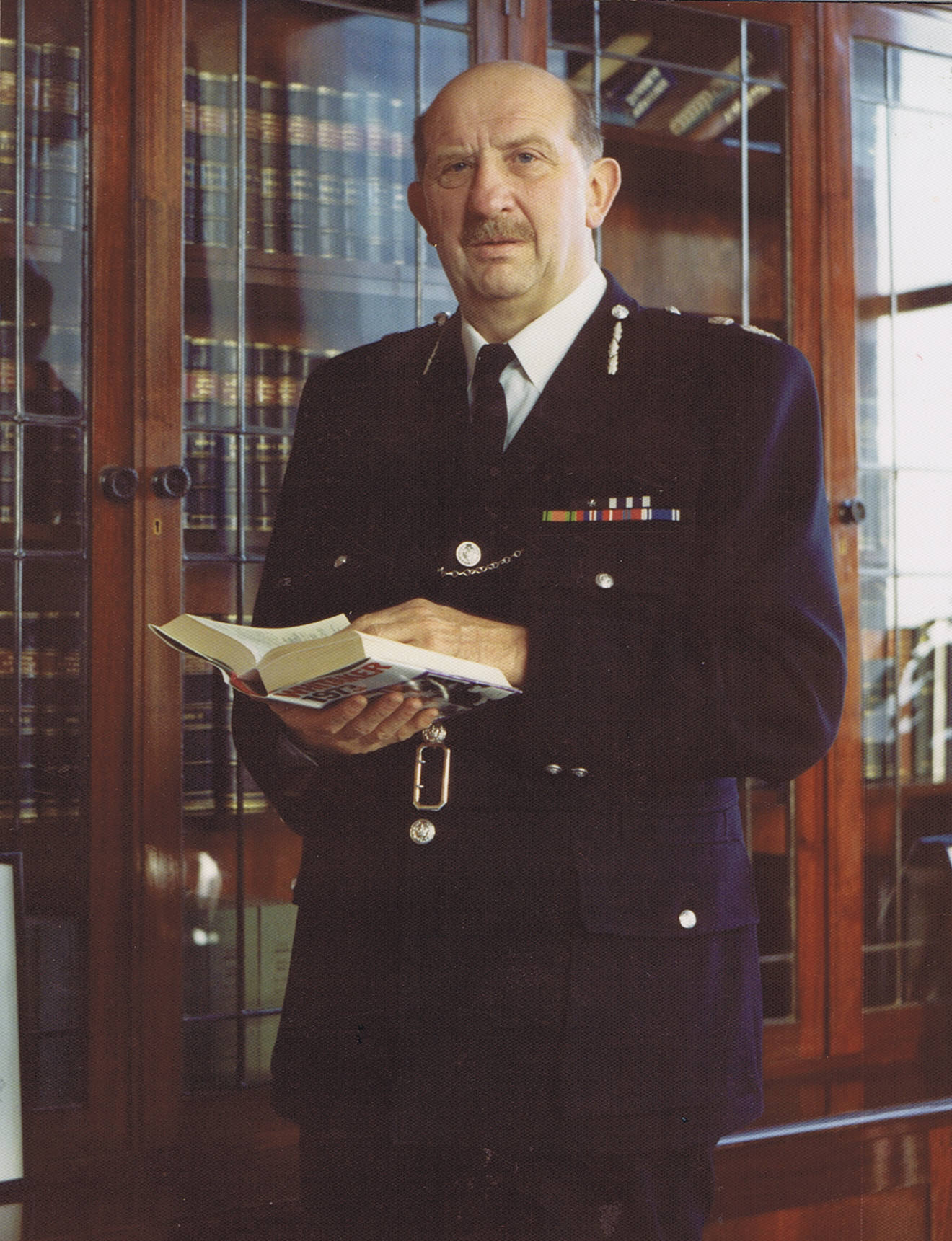
- Born: 3 January 1912; Upton Magna, Shropshire
- Died: 21 March 1977 (aged 65); Shrewsbury, Shropshire
- Occupation: Chief constable

Sir William Derrick Capper CStJ QPM (3 January 1912 – 21 March 1977) was an English police officer and the first Chief Constable of West Midlands Police.

== Early life and education ==
Derrick Capper (as he preferred to continue being known after knighthood) was born in Shropshire on 3 January 1912, son of John Herman Capper, a farmer, of Downton Farm, Upton Magna near Shrewsbury. He was educated at the Priory Grammar School for Boys, Shrewsbury in Shrewsbury and the University of Birmingham, where he read mathematics.

== Career ==
Capper became disillusioned with university life and, during time of the 1930s depression, decided on a police career. He studied at Hendon Police College between 1937 and 1939, following which he joined the Metropolitan Police, as a Police Constable, serving into the years of World War II in London's East End. Apart from an interval detached as an Assistant Superintendent with the Nigerian Police from 1944 to 1946, the first half of his career was spent in the 'Met', during which time he was Station Inspector (1946–49), Chief Inspector (1949-51), Superintendent (1951–57), and ultimately Chief Superintendent (1957–58).

He moved to Birmingham when appointed Assistant Chief Constable of Birmingham City Police in January 1959. In May that year he was promoted Deputy Chief Constable and later appointed as the Chief Constable in 1963. When interviewed about his new role, Capper stated that although fighting crime was a priority, he also had an interest in road traffic and vowed to tackle challenges in this area of policing.

Capper was involved in the Battle of Saltley Gate in 1972, a confrontation between police and picketing miners in the Saltley area of Birmingham during the UK miners' strike.

Capper continued his role as Chief Constable upon the creation of the West Midlands Police on 1 April 1974 after the introduction of the Local Government Act 1972.

During his service, Capper was also made the president of the Association of Chief Police Officers. He remained at West Midlands Police until his retirement on 30 June 1975. He was succeeded by Philip Knights.

=== Death ===
After two operations, Capper died at Shrewsbury Nuffield Nursing Home on 21 March 1977, and was cremated.

== Honours and awards ==
Capper was made a Knight Bachelor in the 1968 Birthday Honours. He was also made an Officer of the Order of St John in 1965 and later promoted to Commander in 1974. He was awarded the Queen's Police Medal in 1962.

Order of St John (CStJ)	1965
Knight Bachelor	1968
Queen's Police Medal (QPM)	1962
Defence Medal	1945
War Medal 1939–1945	1945
Queen Elizabeth II Coronation Medal	1953
Police Long Service and Good Conduct Medal	1972

== Personal life ==
Capper married in 1939 Muriel, daughter of Alfred Woodhouse of Shrewsbury. The couple had two daughters.

In 1973 he stood 6 ft 4 in (1.93 m) tall "in policeman's boots".

Capper was a member of the Freemasons, and keen player of golf, rugby football and athletics sports. In 1976 he became the first deputy-chairman of the West Midlands Council for Sport and Recreation and at the time of his death he was president of the Shrewsbury Rugby Football Club.

Following his retirement from the police service he lived in Shrewsbury at Radbrook.

Police appointments
Preceded by N/A	Chief Constable of the West Midlands; 1974–1975	Succeeded by Philip Knights
