= Chris Simms (disambiguation) =

Chris Simms (born 1980) is a former American football quarterback.

Chris Simms may also refer to:

- Chris Simms (author) (born 1969), British author
- Chris Simms (musician) (fl. 1990s–2000s) in Skunkhour
- Chris Simms (fl. 2000s–2010s), founder of Lazy Dog Cafe

== See also ==
- Chris Sims (disambiguation)
