= Ron Hadfield =

Sir Ronald Hadfield QPM
- Born: 15 July 1939
- Died: 31 January 2013 (aged 73)
- Other names: Ron; Biffo
- Occupation: Police officer
- Employer: West Midlands Police
- Children: Neil Hadfield, Louise Townsend

Sir Ronald Hadfield QPM (15 July 1939 – 31 January 2013) was the Chief Constable of the West Midlands Police from June 1990 until July 1996. He had previously served with Lancashire Constabulary, Greater Manchester Police and Derbyshire Constabulary and was, from 1987 to 1990, Nottinghamshire Police's chief constable. His nickname was "Biffo".

== Career ==
During his time with the West Midlands Police, he oversaw the Hadfield Report into the Birmingham pub bombings. He was International Vice-President of the International Association of Chiefs of Police.

Following his retirement from the police, he was appointed as a consultant in training and people management by the firm of Edge & Ellison.

In the 1995 Queen's Birthday Honours, Hadfield was appointed a Knight Bachelor for services to Police.

== Death ==
He died on 31 January 2013, aged 73, and was survived by his wife, Anne.

Police appointments
Preceded by Geoffrey Dear	Chief Constable of the West Midlands; 1990–1996	Succeeded by Edward Crew
