= Edward Crew (police officer) =

Sir Edward Crew QPM DL
- Born: 13 January 1946 (age 80)
- Occupation: Chief Constable
- Employer(s): Northamptonshire Police; West Midlands Police

Sir Edward Crew (born 13 January 1946) was the Chief Constable of Northamptonshire Police from 1993 to 1996, and of West Midlands Police from August 1996 to 2002.

Crew joined the Metropolitan Police as a Cadet in 1965. He rose through the ranks to chief superintendent and was appointed to Kent County Constabulary where he served as an assistant and the deputy chief constable.

In 1988, he attended the Royal College of Defence Studies. In 1993, he was appointed chief constable of Northamptonshire Police and, in 1996, he was appointed chief constable for the West Midlands. He was awarded the Queen's Police Medal for Distinguished Service in 1990 and was appointed a Deputy Lieutenant on 8 October 1999. He was knighted in 2001 and in the same year awarded an honorary doctorate of laws at Birmingham University. He was knighted in the 2001 New Years Honours List.

In 2011–2012, Crewe provided advice and research support to Tom Winsor during his Independent Review of Police Office and Staff Remuneration and Conditions.

His daughter is Dame Lynne Owens.

== Honours ==
=== Commonwealth honours ===
Commonwealth honours

Location	Date	Appointment	Notes
United Kingdom	2001–present	Knight Bachelor	2001 New Year Honours List
United Kingdom	1990–present	Queen's Police Medal (QPM)	"For distinguished service"
United Kingdom		Officer of the Order of St John	
United Kingdom	6 February 2002 – present	Queen Elizabeth II Golden Jubilee Medal	
United Kingdom	1987–present	Police Long Service and Good Conduct Medal	22 years' full time police service
United Kingdom	8 October 1999 – present	Deputy Lieutenant of County of the West Midlands (DL)	

=== Scholastic ===
Honorary Degrees

Location	Date	School	Degree	Gave Commencement Address
England	2001	University of Birmingham	Doctor of Laws (LLD)	Yes

Police appointments
Preceded by Ron Hadfield	Chief Constable of the West Midlands; 1996–2002	Succeeded by Paul Scott-Lee
