= Chris Sims (police officer) =

Chief Constable of West Midlands Police from 2009 to 2015

Chief Constable Chris Sims OBE, QPM, DL
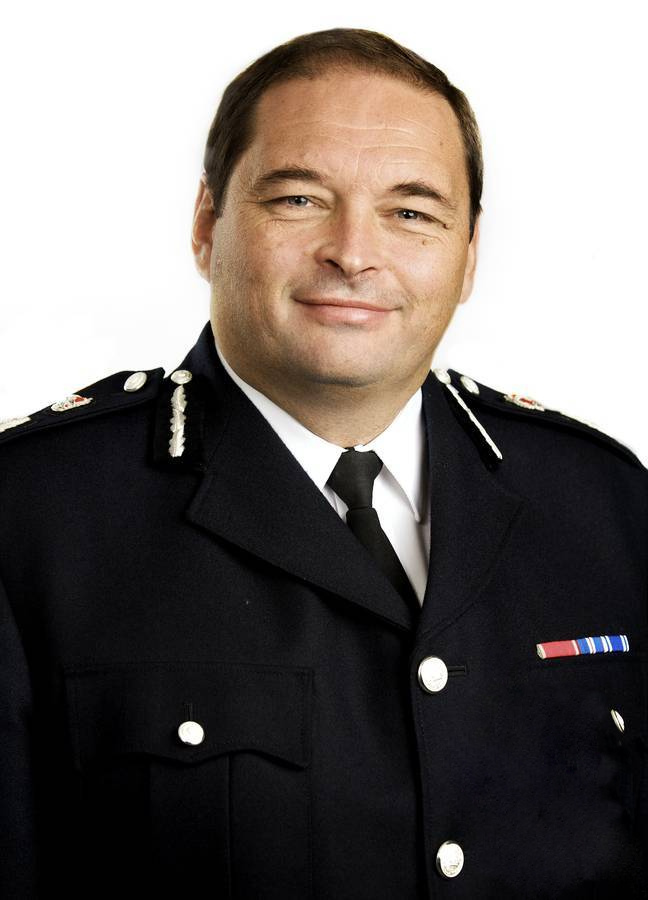
- Sims in 2012

Chief Constable of West Midlands Police
- In office 1 June 2009 – 31 December 2015
- Deputy: Dave Thompson
- Preceded by: Sir Paul Scott-Lee QPM
- Succeeded by: Dave Thompson

Chief Constable of Staffordshire Police
- In office 2007–2009

Personal details
- Education: St Peter's College, Oxford; University of Warwick
- Awards: OBE, QPM

Christopher Peter Sims OBE, QPM, DL is the former Chief Constable of West Midlands Police (WMP), England's second largest and the United Kingdom's third largest police force.

== Education ==
A graduate of St Peter's College, Oxford, Sims also received a Master of Business Administration degree from Warwick University.

== Police career ==
Sims began his policing career in 1980 with the Metropolitan Police force, rising to the rank of chief inspector.

He moved to Staffordshire Police in 1994 on promotion to superintendent. He worked in the professional standards unit, helped establish the performance development team, worked in CID at headquarters and spent a short time as divisional commander at Wombourne before taking up the role of divisional commander at Hanley.

He left Staffordshire in March 1999 to take up the role of Assistant Chief Constable for West Midlands Police. Sims was later appointed Deputy Chief Constable – a post he held for three years. During his time with West Midlands Police, Sims was seconded to Nottinghamshire Police to act as a strategic advisor.

Before taking up his previous role as Chief Constable of Staffordshire in September 2007, Sims was the Deputy Chief Executive and Director of Policing Policy and Practice at the National Policing Improvement Agency (NPIA) based in London. He was responsible for research and evaluation, doctrine development and implementation and portfolio management.

Sims took up new responsibilities as Chief Constable of West Midlands Police on 1 June 2009, and was paid a salary of £172,000 a year.

He retired as Chief Constable of the force on 31 December 2015 and was replaced by Deputy Chief Constable Dave Thompson.

Sims was awarded an OBE for services to the police in the 2003 New Years Honours List and a Queen's Police Medal for distinguished service in the 2010 Queen's Birthday Honours List.

== Personal life ==
Sims has three children.

== Honours ==

Ribbon	Description	Notes
	Order of the British Empire (OBE)	Officer; Civil Division; 2003 New Years Honours List.; For Services to Policing.
	Queen's Police Medal (QPM)	2010 Queen's Birthday Honours List.
	Queen Elizabeth II Golden Jubilee Medal	2002; UK Version of this Medal
	Queen Elizabeth II Diamond Jubilee Medal	2012; UK Version of this Medal
	Police Long Service and Good Conduct Medal	

- He also serves as a Deputy Lieutenant for the County of the West Midlands. This gives him the right to the Post Nominal Letters "DL" for Life.

Police appointments
Preceded by Paul Scott-Lee	Chief Constable of the West Midlands; 2009–2015	Succeeded by Dave Thompson
