= Stop The Game =

2026 sports campaign in Ireland

- #StopTheGame; Part of 2026–27 UEFA Nations League (League B); International reactions to the Gaza War
- Location: Ireland, Debrecen, Hungary, Bačka Topola Serbia
- Goals: The boycotting of both of the Nations League fixtures between the Republic of Ireland and Israel

The Stop The Game (Irish: Stop/Stad an Cluiche) campaign is an ongoing campaign against association football matches scheduled to be played by the Republic of Ireland national football team against the Israel national football team in the UEFA Nations League. The campaign is driven by Irish Sport for Palestine.

The campaign believes that the Republic of Ireland should boycott their games against Israel in response to the ongoing Gaza genocide. The campaigners believe that if the Irish team were to compete in the game, that they would be complicit in Israeli sportswashing.

== Background ==
In 1974, the Israel national football team were forced to leave the Asian Football Confederation after many Muslim and Arab countries refused to play them. With them spending the majority of the years since playing in UEFA.

Since the beginning of the Gaza war in 2023, Israel have been required to play their home matches at neutral venues until further notice.

The Republic of Ireland national football team and the Israel national football team were drawn into 2026–27 UEFA Nations League B Group 3 together alongside Austria and Kosovo, with the matches between the Republic of Ireland and the Israel currently scheduled for 27 September and 4 October 2026.

The campaign was launched by Irish Sport for Palestine, which issued a pre-action letter to the Football Association of Ireland (FAI), Sport Ireland, Minister for Culture, Communications and Sport Patrick O'Donovan, and Minister for Justice, Home Affairs and Migration Jim O'Callaghan, calling for the abolition of the games.

The campaign was discussed in Dáil Éireann on 10 June, where they voted against Ireland playing any matches against Israel (81 for, 68 against). 2 days later, the FAI asked for both fixtures against Israel to be played abroad, (Note: The September fixture to Debrecen, Hungary, and the October fixture from Aviva Stadium to Bačka Topola, Serbia.) which UEFA approved. The FAI also requested of UEFA that the two teams would not be drawn against each other in any future competitions; however, this request was rejected.

At the start of July, after Stop The Game protests started to block the Aviva Stadium, the FAI held an emergency general meeting on whether or not to play any matches against Israel, hoping to end the campaign. The vote passed, with 75 voting in favour of playing them, and 32 against. After the vote, Éirígí for a New Republic organized a protest where protestors scaled the FAI's headquarters at the National Sports Campus in Abbotstown on Dublin's Northside, and unfurled a banner that read "FAI Cowards – Stop The Game!".

=== Tennis ball protest ===
On 28 May, during a friendly between Ireland and Qatar in Aviva Stadium, many tennis balls were thrown onto the pitch. The tennis balls were thrown during the 11th and 20th minutes, causing the match to be paused twice. Tennis balls were also thrown during the 40th minute but the match did not pause. There were also Palestinian flags and banners with the words "stop the game" on them waved in the stands as part of the protests. Ireland beat Qatar 1–0. Stop The Game considers this protest to only be the start of their protests.

== Responses ==
Bohemian Football Club @bfcdublin
- Ireland must not play Israel in the UEFA nations league.
- #StopTheGame
- Video

On 11 June 2026, Irish football club Bohemians released a video on X (formerly Twitter), expressing support for the campaign. Throughout the video, the phrases; "I know the difference between right and wrong", "6 points or 75,000 lives", "I have a heart", "Ireland has an opportunity to stand up for what is right", "We are not willing to sportswash genocide", and "Stop the game" were repeated. Notable participants in the video include former Sinn Féin president Gerry Adams, Irish football manager Brian Kerr, former League of Ireland player Eoin Doyle, Leinster rugby player Trevor Horgan, and Teachta Dála (TD) for the Social Democrats Sinéad Gibney. Other notable groups and individuals who publicly support the campaign include Bohemians' chief operating officer Daniel Lambert, who is also the manager of the Belfast band Kneecap, Kneecap themselves, Sinn Féin TD Darren O'Rourke, Irish actor Liam Cunningham, activism group Pals For Palestine, Irish folk music group The Mary Wallopers, Irish rock band Fontaines D.C., Irish-Cape Verdean footballer Pico Lopes, and the Labour Party.

== The games ==
=== 26 September ===
On the morning of 26 September 2026, the Irish players did not turn up to their pre-match press conference or training session in Debrecen, Hungary ahead of their game the next day. Following a team meeting and a vote held among the squad, it was announced by the FAI CEO David Courell, that the game would be going ahead as voted by the players. He also announced that the Irish players would wear black armbands "in recognition of all lives lost in the conflict".

On 26 September, it was announced that Republic of Ireland goalkeeper Gavin Bazunu was withdrawing from the squad, not wanting to participate in the games. Bazunu would go on to release a statement on Instagram where he said "It would be wrong to participate" in the game and that his "decision is based purely upon my personal belief that the killing of innocent people is wrong".

=== 27 September ===
Due to Ireland needing three goalkeepers in their squad to fulfill the fixture, defender Jimmy Dunne was registered as a goalkeeper for the game.

On 27 September the first game between Ireland and Israel went ahead. Before the game the Irish players bowed their heads during the Israeli national anthem, and the two teams did not shake hands. Ireland won the game 3–0 thanks to goals from Troy Parrott, Adam Idah and Jack Moylan. After his goal Moylan took off and kissed his black armband in tribute to Palestine.

During the game the Israeli fans directed racist chants at Republic of Ireland player, Adam Idah. Following the game it was announced by UEFA that they could not investigate the matter due to the officiating team not following the proper procedures for such an event during the game. The Israeli fans also chanted for the IDF after the game.
