= Craig Guildford =

Chief Constable of West Midlands Police since 2022

Craig Guildford QPM VR DL OStJ

Chief Constable of West Midlands Police
- In office 5 December 2022 – 16 January 2026
- Preceded by: David Thompson
- Succeeded by: Scott Green (acting)

Chief Constable of Nottinghamshire Police
- In office 2017–2022

Personal details
- Born: Craig Lewis Guildford; 1973 or 1974 (age 52–53)
- Education: University of Derby
- Occupation: Police officer

Craig Lewis Guildford (born 1973 or 1974) is a British retired police officer who served as the chief constable of West Midlands Police between 2022 and 2026, having begun his police career as a special constable with Cheshire Constabulary.

He is a Deputy Lieutenant of Nottinghamshire and a member of the Army Reserve.

== Early life and education ==
Craig Lewis Guildford was born in 1973 or January 1974.

He obtained a degree in geography at the University of Derby.

== Career ==
He joined Cheshire Constabulary as a police constable in 1994, having been a special constable there since 1992, while also a student.

Guildford spent time on CID in Cheshire before being seconded to the National Crime Squad in Manchester in 2000. Guildford eventually reached the rank of Superintendent in Cheshire Constabulary.

He was made assistant chief constable at West Yorkshire Police in October 2012, and deputy chief constable with Gwent Police in April 2014.

Guildford then made the move to Nottinghamshire Police, to become their Chief Constable in February 2017.

=== West Midlands Police ===
On 25 July 2022, Police and Crime Commissioner Simon Foster confirmed that Guildford would replace David Thompson as the Chief Constable of the West Midlands Police. Guildford formally took the role on 5 December 2022.

He also served as the National Police Chiefs' Council lead officer for professional standards and ethics, and complaints and misconduct.

In November 2023, an incident took place following a function at the Tally-Ho! Police Training School in Edgbaston, in which Guildford and an Inspector from His Majesty's Inspectorate of the Constabulary called 999 after their taxi driver began driving erratically, leading Guildford to believe they were being robbed.

In November 2024, he retired as Chief Constable of West Midlands Police for one month in order to protect his pension, which would otherwise have fallen in value after 30 years' unbroken service, before taking up the post again. Scott Green served as Acting Chief Constable in the interim.

==== Maccabi Tel Aviv incident and retirement ====
On 14 January 2026, the Home Secretary, Shabana Mahmood, declared in the House of Commons that she had no confidence in Guildford, following a select committee review of his force's advice to ban away fans from Maccabi Tel Aviv F.C. game against Aston Villa in Birmingham on 6 November 2025. An intelligence report compiled by West Midlands Police for the local safety advisory group contained errors, including the misrepresentation of information received from Dutch police about a previous match in Amsterdam. The report also mentioned a non-existent match between Maccabi Tel Aviv and West Ham. When appearing before the House of Commons' Home Affairs Select Committee, Guildford denied suggestions that AI had been used in writing the report and said that the fictitious match had appeared in a Google search. On 14 January 2026, he apologised to the Home Affairs Select Committee for having misled them, admitting that Microsoft Copilot, an AI tool, had generated the fictitious West Ham match. Subsequently, Mahmood said that she would have sacked Guildford if she had had the power to do so.

On 16 January 2026, Foster announced Guilford's retirement "with immediate effect". Deputy Chief Constable Scott Green was appointed as Guildford's successor in an acting capacity. The Shadow Home Secretary, Chris Philp, criticised the decision to allow Guildford to retire and called for him to face misconduct proceedings. The following Monday, Foster referred Guildford to the Independent Office for Police Conduct.

On 26 August 2026, the Independent Office for Police Conduct announced that a group of West Midlands Police staff members were under investigation, including potential gross misconduct by Guildford and another individual, with an IOPC statement saying that there were concerns about the accuracy and oversight regarding a document that supported the exclusion of Maccabi Tel Aviv supporters and that "some people serving with the police may potentially have behaved in a manner that could justify disciplinary proceedings".

=== Military service ===
Guildford served in the Adjutant General's Corps of the Army Reserve. He was originally a member of the other ranks, reaching the rank of sergeant. On 3 February 2014, he was commissioned in the British Army as a lieutenant (on probation). and immediately became a captain in the Provost Branch.

== Honours and awards ==
In 2017, Guildford was appointed an Officer of the Order of Saint John (OStJ). He was awarded the Queen's Police Medal for Distinguished Service (QPM) in the 2021 Birthday Honours, and an honorary doctorate by the University of Derby in November that year.

== Personal life ==
Guildford is married to Fiona. As of 2017, he was married with three children.

Police appointments
Preceded by Susannah Fish; Acting	Chief Constable of Nottinghamshire Police; 2017–2022	Succeeded by Kate Meynell
Preceded by Sir David Thompson	Chief Constable of the West Midlands; 2022–2026	Succeeded by Scott Green; Acting
