= Chris Whitey Sims =

American songwriter

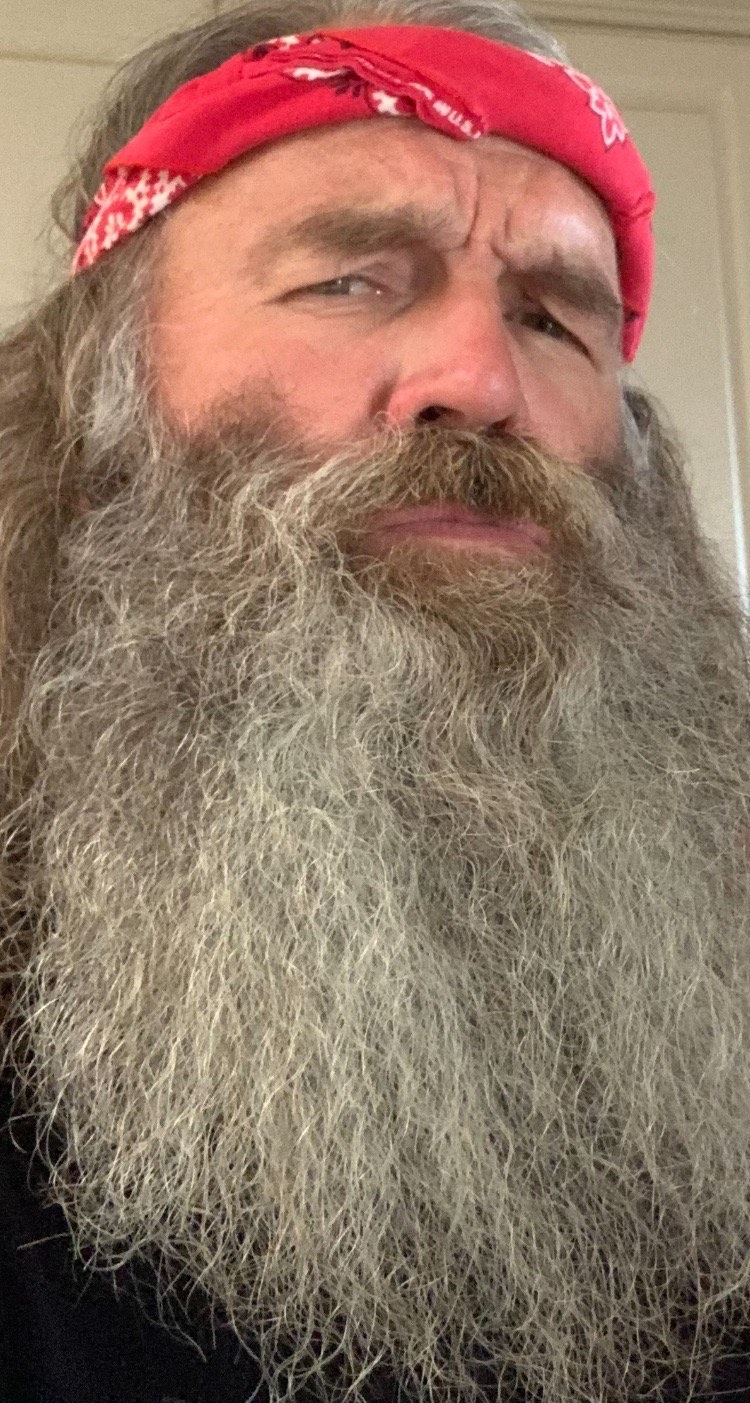
- Born: May 28, 1966 (age 60); Fort Hood, Texas
- Occupations: Musician (1980–2001), Newspaper Editor (2001–present)
- Known for: The Leaving Trains
- Children: 3

Chris Whitey Sims (born 1966) is a musician, songwriter and first amendment activist known for his work with The Leaving Trains, Graveyard Rodeo and his current band Tender.

== Musical career ==
In 1991 Falling James Moreland briefly disbanded The Leaving Trains to form The Power of Sky. Along with Power of Sky's bassist, Chris Whitey Sims, Moreland reassembled a new Leaving Trains with Bobby Belltower (who had briefly played in the previous incarnation of the band) and Lenny Montoya. This lineup produced two albums on SST Records: Loser Illusion Part 0 released 1991 (SST284), and The Lump in My Forehead released 1992 (SST288), with James Moreland and Chris Whitey Sims as primary songwriters.

Chris Sims also performed with Pepper Keenan in Graveyard Rodeo, a local New Orleans band in the mid-1980s as featured in Life, Death and Heavy Blues from the Bayou.

Sims also appears on The FuckEmos album "Airshow" released by Man's Ruin (MR-181) in 2000.

== Reshaping the musical direction of the Leaving Trains ==
(The Leaving Trains sound) changed early in 1991, when (Falling James) Moreland hooked up with his new bandmate and writing partner, Chris Whitey Sims. "He's very caustic and insulting and macho," Moreland said. "He really sets people off because he's so insulting. Because of him chiding me and kicking me, I got to the point where I stopped writing about myself and my horrible love life, and we started writing about anything around us."

== Nude performance ==
The LA Times reported on one of Whitey Sims notable nude performances when the Leaving Trains performed at the Cal State Northridge Campus. Sims' strip brought shocked gasps and jubilant cheers from students, which was a plus of sorts for the band... Word spread quickly, and other students on their way to class crowded into the quad to see the naked singer." The article also quotes AS/SPACE executive director Susie Shannon "Who would have thought (he) would have stripped in front of 200 students? I'm completely shocked. We're going to make a public apology to the students in the campus newspaper. I mean, we don't book bands like that."

== Film ==
A Moreland / Sims song, "Kids Wanna Know", released on Loser Illusion Part 0, appeared in cheerleader movie Bring It On which spun off numerous films and a play. Initially unimpressed with the film, Roger Ebert later referred to it as the "Citizen Kane of cheerleader movies."
