= 2007 plot to behead a British Muslim soldier =

2007 criminal plot in England

The 2007 plot to behead a British Muslim soldier was a plot in Birmingham, England, to kidnap and behead a British Muslim soldier in order to undermine the morale of the British Army and inhibit its recruitment of Muslims. The instigator, Parviz Khan, admitted the plot and was sentenced to life imprisonment, to serve at least 14 years. Another of the accused was found guilty of failing to report the plot and four others were sentenced to up to seven years for supplying equipment to Pakistan-based militants fighting coalition forces in Afghanistan.

== Plot ==
Shortly after the arrests, reports appeared in a number of newspapers with details of the plot, citing unnamed security sources. According to the newspaper reports, the plot involved kidnapping a British Muslim soldier and taking him either to a run-down house in Leatherhead Close, Aston, Birmingham, believed to be owned by the wife of suspect Zahoor Iqbal or a safe house in Tipton, 9 mi (14 km) from Birmingham. There, he would be blindfolded, handcuffed, made to demand the withdrawal of troops from Iraq, and then killed. A video of this would be released on the Internet. Some newspaper reports also said that the group spent months compiling a hit list of 25 potential targets.

Four people were separately accused of supplying equipment on four occasions to Pakistan-based militants fighting the International Security Assistance Force in Afghanistan. They had used the 2005 Kashmir earthquake as a cover to ship anglers' gloves used by snipers, sleeping bags, boots, waterproof map holders, laser rangefinders, anti-bugging equipment, video cameras and mobile phones.

== Arrests ==
For six months, British police forces and intelligence agencies, under the codename Operation Gamble, had been investigating the plot. They had hoped to investigate for another two months before making arrests, but when one of the suspects purchased a video camera it was feared that this was done in preparation for the kidnapping, so the police brought forward their decision to make the arrests.

On 31 January 2007, just before 4:00 am, more than 700 police officers raided eight homes and four businesses, including a corner store, two Islamic bookstores and an internet café. Eight men were arrested then, with a ninth arrested later in the afternoon while driving into Birmingham.

=== Leaks ===
The sentencing judge described the leaking of information to the media at the time of the arrests as being a "very grave contempt of court". An inquiry by the Metropolitan Police failed to discover the source of these leaks. The civil liberties organisation Liberty said these leaks risked "undermining the work of police and prosecutors and jeopardising the trust and safety of the public".

== Outcome ==
In February 2008, five men were sentenced after admitting or being found guilty of these allegations.

Name	Charge/Suspicion	Outcome	Sentence
Pervaiz Khan	conspiracy to kidnap and murder supplying terrorists	Pleaded guilty	Life, serving a minimum of 14 years
Basiru Gassama	failing to report the conspiracy	Pleaded guilty	2 years followed by deportation
Amjad Mahmood	failing to report the conspiracy	Cleared	n/a
Zahoor Iqbal	supplying terrorists	Pleaded guilty	7 years
Mohammed Irfan	supplying terrorists	Pleaded guilty	4 years
Hamid Elasmar	supplying terrorists	Found guilty	3 years 4 months

Gassama was born in Mansaringsu, Brikama, Gambia. He attended madrasahs in Gambia and Senegal, and continued his education in Saudi Arabia. He then moved to the UK and acquired citizenship. He is married to the daughter of a former Gambian Foreign Affairs minister whose name was withheld from the press. His brother was arrested in March 2006 in Banjul, Gambia as a suspect in a plot to overthrow Gambian president Yahya Jammeh. He lived in Hodge Hill, Birmingham at the time of his arrest and worked at Khan's General Store.

Iqbal was a 29-year-old teacher who lives in Kingstanding, north Birmingham. He taught Information Technology part-time at Saltley School, a specialist science college.

Amjad Mahmood of Birmingham was acquitted of all charges after a separate trial.

== See also ==
- 2007 UK terrorist incidents
- Murder of Lee Rigby
- List of terrorist incidents in Great Britain
