= Operation Safeguard (United Kingdom) =

2006 prison overcrowding contingency plan

Operation Safeguard is a contingency plan to deal with prison overcrowding in the United Kingdom; it involves using cells at police stations as accommodation for prisoners when the number of cells in prisons becomes critically low. On 9 October 2006, the Home Secretary John Reid announced the implementation of Operation Safeguard as the prison population had reached 79,843 leaving only 125 spaces.

The policy is supported by the Association of Chief Police Officers, it outlined a list of criteria for prisoners who should not be held in police station cells under Safeguard, including among others: women, juveniles and those with mental health problems or those involved in a Crown Court trial.

== Alternatives to Operation Safeguard ==
The government has considered several alternatives to Safeguard, including repatriating foreign prisoners to their home country, with a financial incentive. Other ways of reducing the prison population include:

- Early executive release
- Deportation of foreign prisoners
- Use of a prison ship

Lord Phillips, the former Lord Chief Justice, also suggested a greater use of community sentences could reduce the pressure on prisons.

== See also ==
- United Kingdom prison population
- Prison
- Prison reform
- List of prisons in the United Kingdom
- Prison categories (UK)
- Prison Officers' Association
