= Andy Cooke (police officer) =

British public servant and former police officer (born 1964)

Sir Andy Cooke QPM DL
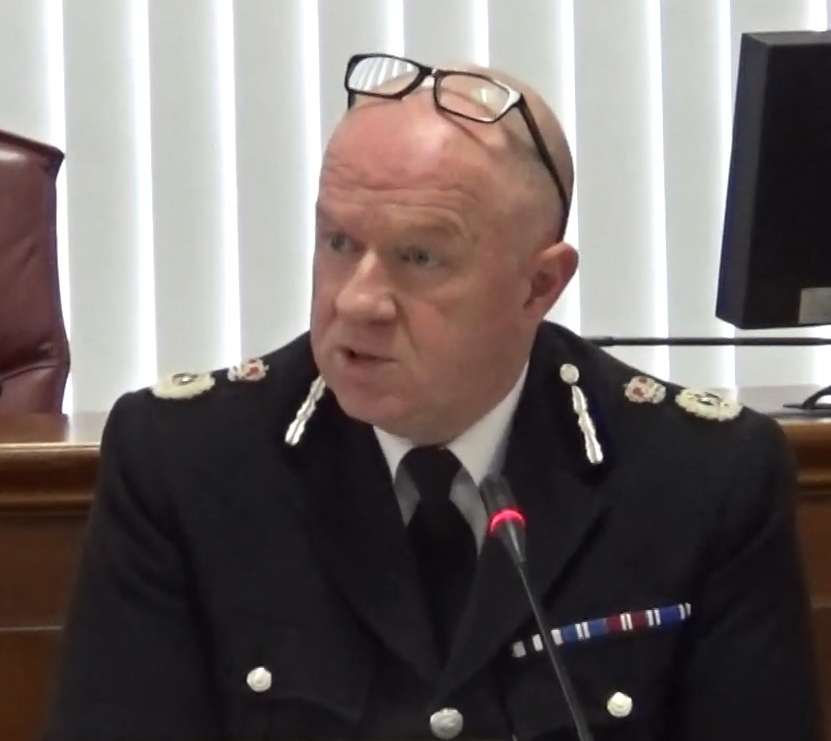
- Cooke as Chief Constable of Merseyside Police in 2020

His Majesty's Chief Inspector of Constabulary and Fire & Rescue Services
- In office 1 April 2022 – 31 March 2026
- Preceded by: Sir Tom Winsor
- Succeeded by: Michelle Skeer

Chief constable of Merseyside Police
- In office 2016–2021
- PCC: Jane Kennedy
- Succeeded by: Dame Serena Kennedy

Personal details
- Born: Andrew James Cooke; 10 March 1964 (age 62) Liverpool, England
- Education: University of Nottingham
- Profession: Police officer

Sir Andrew James Cooke (born 10 March 1964) is a British public servant and former police officer. Since 1 April 2022, he has served as His Majesty's Chief Inspector of Constabulary and His Majesty's Chief Inspector of Fire & Rescue Services. He had served as a police officer and detective with Merseyside Police and Lancashire Constabulary, rising to become chief constable of Merseyside Police from 2016 to 2021.

== Biography ==
Cooke was born on 10 March 1964 in Liverpool, England. He was educated at St Francis Xavier's College, then a Catholic grammar school in Liverpool. He studied politics at the University of Nottingham, graduating with a Bachelor of Arts (BA) degree in 1985.

In 1985, Cooke joined Merseyside Police as a constable. Then, from 1989 to 2008, he served as a detective, working through each rank from detective constable to detective chief superintendent. In 2008, he became a chief officer, having been appointed assistant chief constable of Lancashire Constabulary. He was ACC Specialist Operations and ACC Territorial Operations. He returned to Merseyside Police in 2013 as its deputy chief constable, before being appointed its chief constable in 2016. In addition to the roles he held within his force, he was national policing lead for witness protection (2008–2017), for serious and organised crime (2017–2019), and for crime business area (2019–2021).

In February 2021, it was announced that he had been appointed an Inspector of Constabulary for England and Wales: he took up the appointment on 12 April 2021. In March 2022, it was revealed that he was the British government's preferred candidate for the joint role of HM Chief Inspector of Constabulary and Chief Fire & Rescue Inspector in England. He took up the posts on 12 April 2021, in succession to Sir Tom Winsor.

In the 2014 Queen's Birthday Honours, Cooke was awarded the Queen's Police Medal for Distinguished Service (QPM) for his service as deputy chief constable of Merseyside Police. In September 2021, he was made a Deputy Lieutenant (DL) to the Lord Lieutenant of Merseyside.

Cooke was knighted in the 2025 New Year Honours for services to Policing and to Public Service.

== Honours ==

Ribbon	Description	Notes
	Knight Bachelor (Kt)	
	Queen's Police Medal (QPM)	
	Queen Elizabeth II Golden Jubilee Medal	
	Queen Elizabeth II Diamond Jubilee Medal	
	Police Long Service and Good Conduct Medal	

Police appointments
Preceded by Sir Jon Murphy	Chief constable of Merseyside Police; 2016 to 2021	Succeeded by Dame Serena Kennedy
