= Colin Woods =

English police officer

Sir Colin Woods KCVO CBE QPM

1st Commissioner of the Australian Federal Police
- In office 1 August 1979 – 1 January 1982
- Preceded by: New Office
- Succeeded by: Major General Ronald Grey

HM Chief Inspector of Constabulary for England and Wales
- In office 1977–1979
- Preceded by: Sir James Haughton
- Succeeded by: Sir James Crane

Personal details
- Born: 20 April 1920 London, United Kingdom
- Died: 27 January 2001 (aged 80)
- Profession: Police officer

Sir Colin Philip Joseph Woods KCVO CBE QPM (20 April 1920 – 27 January 2001) was an English police officer in the London Metropolitan Police who was also the first Commissioner of the Australian Federal Police, from 1979 to 1982.

Born in London, Woods was the son of a Metropolitan Police Sub-Divisional Inspector and was educated at Finchley Grammar School. He served in the King's Royal Rifle Corps and the Royal Ulster Rifles (into which he was commissioned in February 1944) throughout the Second World War, from 1939 to 1946, and then joined the Metropolitan Police as a Constable, rising through the ranks to Deputy Commander.

In 1966, he was promoted Commander (Traffic) and in 1968 Deputy Assistant Commissioner (Management Services). The following year he was appointed Commandant of Bramshill Police College, and in 1970 returned to the Met as Assistant Commissioner "B" (Traffic). On 31 March 1972 he was moved to be Assistant Commissioner "C" (Crime). This caused a certain amount of controversy, since he had never previously served in the Criminal Investigation Department (CID), which he was now taking over. Robert Mark, the new Commissioner, had already stated that he believed uniformed and CID officers should be interchangeable in senior posts, and Woods's appointment was the first example of this policy. He was appointed Commander of the Order of the British Empire (CBE) in the 1973 Birthday Honours. In 1975, Mark appointed Woods Deputy Commissioner. He was appointed Knight Commander of the Royal Victorian Order (KCVO) in the 1977 Birthday Honours.

On 1 August 1977, Woods was appointed HM Chief Inspector of Constabulary. He held this post for two years until he was asked to establish the new Australian Federal Police in 1979. He was awarded the Queen's Police Medal (QPM) in the 1980 New Year Honours.

== Footnotes ==
Police appointments
Preceded by Unknown	Commander (Traffic), Metropolitan Police; 1966–1968	Succeeded by Henry Hunt
Preceded by Unknown	Deputy Assistant Commissioner (Management Services), Metropolitan Police; 1968–1969	Succeeded by Unknown
Preceded by John Gaskain	Commandant of the National Police College; 1969–1970	Succeeded by John Alderson
Preceded by James Starritt	Assistant Commissioner "B", Metropolitan Police; 1970–1972	Succeeded by Henry Hunt
Preceded by Peter Brodie	Assistant Commissioner "C", Metropolitan Police; 1972–1975	Succeeded by Jock Wilson
Preceded by Sir James Starritt	Deputy Commissioner of Police of the Metropolis; 1975–1977	Succeeded by Patrick Kavanagh
Preceded by Sir James Haughton	HM Chief Inspector of Constabulary for England and Wales; 1977–1979	Succeeded by James Crane
Preceded by First incumbent	Commissioner of the Australian Federal Police; 1979–1982	Succeeded by Ronald Grey
