= Keith Povey =

Sir Keith Povey, QPM (born 30 April 1943) was Chief Inspector of Constabulary from 2002 until 2005.

Povey was educated at Abbeydale Grammar School and the University of Sheffield. Povey joined Sheffield City Police in 1962. His early service included time as a sergeant instructor at Pannal Ash police college. Rising to the rank of Superintendent further promotion followed to Chief Superintendent with the South Yorkshire Police when he was seconded to the staff of the then Chief Inspector of Constabulary Lawrence Byford. In 1986 he became Assistant Chief Constable of Humberside Police; in 1990 Deputy Chief Constable of Northamptonshire Police; and in 1993 Chief Constable of Leicestershire Police. In 1997 he joined the staff of HM Inspectorate and served for five years before being appointed its head.

He was knighted in the 2001 Birthday Honours for services to the police.

== Honours ==
Ribbon	Honour	Year	Reference
	Queen's Police Medal		

Police appointments
Preceded by David O'Dowd	HM Chief Inspector of Constabulary for England, Wales and Northern Ireland; 2002 –2005	Succeeded by Ronnie Flanagan
Preceded by Michael John Hirst	Chief Constable of Leicestershire; 1993–1997	Succeeded by David Wyrko
