= John Woodcock (police officer) =

Sir John Woodcock CBE CStJ QPM (14 January 1932 – 21 September 2012) was Chief Inspector of Constabulary from January 1990 to July 1993.

== Career ==
=== Rising through the ranks ===
Born in Preston to a painter and decorator, Woodcock joined the Lancashire Constabulary as a Police cadet in 1947. Between 1950 and 1952 he served in the Special Investigation Branch of the Royal Military Police during the Korean War. He rejoined the Lancashire Constabulary after the war as a Constable rising to the rank of Chief Inspector by 1965, in which year he transferred to the Bedfordshire and Luton Constabulary. There he was promoted to Superintendent and then Chief Superintendent.

=== Senior rank ===
In 1968 he transferred to Gwent Constabulary and was promoted to Assistant Chief Constable. He was next Deputy Chief Constable of Gwent (1970-1974) and then of Devon and Cornwall Constabulary (1974-1978). After this he became Chief Constable of North Yorkshire Police (1978-1979) then of South Wales Constabulary (1979-1983), followed by the post of HM Inspector of Constabulary for Wales and the Midlands (1983-1990). His final role before retirement was as Chief Inspector of Constabulary (1990-1993).

== Awards ==
He was awarded the Queen's Police Medal in 1976. He was appointed a Commander of the Order of the British Empire in 1983, and was knighted in 1989.

Ribbon	Description	Notes
	Knight Bachelor (Kt)	1989
	Order of the British Empire (CBE)	Commander; Civil Division; 1983
	Order of St John (CStJ)	Commander
	Queen's Police Medal (QPM)	1976
	Korea Medal	1952
	United Nations Korea Medal	1952
	Queen Elizabeth II Silver Jubilee Medal	1977
	Police Long Service and Good Conduct Medal	

Police appointments
Preceded by Richard Barrett	HM Chief Inspector of Constabulary for England, Wales and Northern Ireland; 1990 –1993	Succeeded by Trefor Morris
Preceded by T G Morris	Chief Constable of South Wales Constabulary; 1979 –1983	Succeeded by David East
Preceded by Robert Boyes	Chief Constable of North Yorkshire Police; 1978 – 1979	Succeeded by Kenneth Henshaw
