= Jock Wilson (police officer) =

Metropolitan Police Assistant Commissioner (1922–1993)

Jock Wilson CBE

Commander (Special Branch), Metropolitan Police
- In office 1969–1972

Deputy Assistant Commissioner (Crime), Metropolitan Police
- In office 1972–1975

Assistant Commissioner "C", Metropolitan Police
- In office 1975–1977
- Preceded by: Colin Woods
- Succeeded by: Gilbert Kelland

Assistant Commissioner "B", Metropolitan Police
- In office 1977–1982
- Preceded by: Patrick Kavanagh
- Succeeded by: John Dellow

Personal details
- Born: May 9, 1922 Dundee, Scotland
- Died: September 15, 1993 (aged 71)
- Citizenship: British
- Occupation: Police officer
- Awards: OBE; CBE

Military service
- Allegiance: United Kingdom
- Years of service: 1946–1982

John Spark Wilson CBE (9 May 1922 – 15 September 1993), known as Jock Wilson, was a British police officer in the London Metropolitan Police.

Wilson was brought up in Dundee. He joined the Metropolitan Police as a Constable in 1946 and joined Special Branch, in which he was to spend over twenty years, in 1948. Promoted Detective Chief Superintendent in 1968, he was in charge of security for the Investiture of the Prince of Wales at Caernarfon Castle in 1969, which was threatened by Welsh nationalists. In 1969 he was promoted to Commander and took command of Special Branch. He was appointed Officer of the Order of the British Empire (OBE) in the 1969 Investiture Honours.

In 1972 he was promoted to Deputy Assistant Commissioner (Crime) and on 17 May 1975 he was appointed Assistant Commissioner "C" (Crime). In 1977 he was transferred as Assistant Commissioner "B" (Traffic), holding the post until his retirement in 1982. He then served as Director of the Security and Investigation Service of T. Miller & Co until 1987. He was appointed Commander of the Order of the British Empire (CBE) in 1979.

== Footnotes ==
Police appointments
Preceded by Unknown	Commander (Special Branch), Metropolitan Police; 1969–1972	Succeeded by Unknown
Preceded by Unknown	Deputy Assistant Commissioner (Crime), Metropolitan Police; 1972–1975	Succeeded by Unknown
Preceded by Colin Woods	Assistant Commissioner "C", Metropolitan Police; 1975–1977	Succeeded by Gilbert Kelland
Preceded by Patrick Kavanagh	Assistant Commissioner "B", Metropolitan Police; 1977–1982	Succeeded by John Dellow
