= Deputy commander =

A deputy commander is the second-in-command to a commander.

Deputy commander may also refer to:

- Deputy commander (Metropolitan Police), a rank in London's Metropolitan Police between 1946 and 1968
- Deputy Commander (horse) (1994–2009), American racehorse
