= Trefor Morris =

Sir Trefor Alfred Morris CBE QPM (born 22 December 1934) was Chief Inspector of Constabulary from 1993 to 1996.

Morris was educated at Ducie Technical High School and the University of Manchester. Morris joined the Manchester City Police in 1955 and by the time of the creation of the Greater Manchester Force was a Chief Superintendent. He was appointed Assistant Chief Constable of that force in 1976.

He transferred to Hertfordshire Constabulary as Deputy Chief Constable in 1979 and served as Chief Constable from 1984 to 1990.

Police appointments
Preceded by John Woodcock	HM Chief Inspector of Constabulary for England, Wales and Northern Ireland; 1993 –1996	Succeeded by David O'Dowd
