= Richard Barratt =

British police officer and former Her Majesty's Chief Inspector of Constabulary

Chief Constable Sir Richard Barratt CBE QPM

Chief Inspector of Constabulary
- In office 1987–1990
- Preceded by: Lawrence Byford
- Succeeded by: John Woodcock

Chief Constable of South Yorkshire Police
- In office 1975–1978
- Preceded by: Position Established
- Succeeded by: James Hilton Brownlow

Personal details
- Born: 11 August 1928
- Died: 5 May 2013 (aged 84)
- Profession: Police officer

Sir Richard Stanley Barratt, CBE, QPM (11 August 1928 – 5 May 2013) was chief inspector of constabulary from 1987 to 1990.

== Education ==
Barratt was educated at Saltley Grammar School.

== Career ==
He joined Birmingham City Police in 1949, rising to become chief inspector. He was with Cheshire Police from 1965 to 1966 (superintendent to chief superintendent); and with the Manchester Force from 1967 to 1975 (assistant chief constable to deputy chief constable). He was chief constable of South Yorkshire Police from 1975 to 1978 when he joined Her Majesty's Inspectorate of Constabulary.

== Awards ==
He was awarded the Queen's Police Medal in 1973. He was appointed a commander of the Order of the British Empire in 1979, and was knighted in 1984.

Ribbon	Description	Notes
	Knight Bachelor	1988
	Order of the British Empire (CBE)	1981; Commander; Civil Division
	Queen's Police Medal (QPM)	1974
	Police Long Service and Good Conduct Medal	

== Private life ==
In 1952 he married Sarah Elizabeth Hale: they had one son and two daughters, two granddaughters and two grandsons.

Police appointments
Preceded by Lawrence Byford	HM Chief Inspector of Constabulary for England, Wales and Northern Ireland; 1987–1990	Succeeded by John Woodcock
Preceded by Position established	Chief constable of South Yorkshire Police; 1975–1978	Succeeded by James Hilton Brownlow
