= Philip Lane (police officer) =

British police officer

Sir Philip Lane CBE MVO KPM

Chief Constable of Lancashire Constabulary
- In office April 1912 – 24 April 1927

Assistant Chief Constable of Lancashire Constabulary
- In office 1909 – April 1912

Personal details
- Born: Harry Philip Parnell Lane; 3 March 1870 Plymouth, Devon, England
- Died: 24 April 1927 (aged 57) Malvern, Worcestershire, England

Sir Harry Philip Parnell Lane CBE MVO KPM (3 March 1870 – 24 April 1927) was a British police officer who served as Chief Constable of Lancashire Constabulary from April 1912 until his death in 1927.

== Biography ==
Lane was born into a military family in Plymouth, Devon, the only son of Major Henry Eyre Wyatt Lane and Maria Parnell. His father served in the Royal Marine Light Infantry, his grandfather Charles Henry John Lane was an Army Captain, and his great-grandfather was a Royal Navy officer. All had at some point served as prison governors. Lane was also intended for the Army, but instead joined the Essex County Constabulary as a Constable in 1887, a very unusual career move for a gentleman at the time. He served as a clerk in the Chief Constable's office. In 1896 he transferred to the Devon County Constabulary as a Superintendent. He served as Deputy Chief Constable of Kent County Constabulary from 1900 to 1902, Assistant Head Constable of Liverpool City Police from 1902 to 1909, and Assistant Chief Constable of Lancashire from 1909 to 1912.

Lane was appointed Member of the Royal Victorian Order 4th Class (MVO) in 1913 for organising royal visits to Lancashire, Commander of the Order of the British Empire (CBE) in the 1918 civilian war honours for policing the many munitions factories in the county during the First World War, and knighted in the 1925 New Year Honours. He was awarded the King's Police Medal (KPM) in the 1921 New Year Honours.

He was one of the first Chief Constables in the country to introduce motorcycle combination patrols and Wireless communications. He was also one of the few county constabulary Chief Constables before the latter half of the 20th century to be a career policeman and not a military officer or lawyer.

Lane was taken ill suddenly after organising the policing of the 1927 Grand National, having only recently got over influenza. He was moved to a nursing home in Malvern, but died shortly afterwards.

Police appointments
Preceded by Charles Villiers Ibbetson	Chief Constable of Lancashire; 1912–1927	Succeeded by Wilfred Trubshaw
