= Henry Hunt (police officer) =

British police officer

Henry James Ellis Hunt CVO CBE (8 June 1918 – 27 January 2008) was a British police officer in the London Metropolitan Police.

Hunt spent most of his early police service in East London and with Thames Division. After spending eight months as Commander (Traffic), he was promoted to Deputy Assistant Commissioner (Administration) in January 1969. He was appointed Officer of the Order of the British Empire (OBE) in the 1971 New Year Honours. He was appointed Assistant Commissioner "B" (Traffic) in 1972. In January 1974 he moved to be Assistant Commissioner "D" (Personnel and Training), a post he occupied until 1978. He was appointed Commander of the Order of the British Empire (CBE) in the 1976 New Year Honours and Commander of the Royal Victorian Order (CVO) in the 1978 New Year Honours, shortly before his retirement. Hunt died in January 2008 in Wood Green, London at the age of 89.

== Footnotes ==
Police appointments
Preceded by Colin Woods	Commander (Traffic), Metropolitan Police; 1968–1969	Succeeded by Unknown
Preceded by Unknown	Deputy Assistant Commissioner (Administration), Metropolitan Police; 1969–1972	Succeeded by Unknown
Preceded by Colin Woods	Assistant Commissioner "B", Metropolitan Police; 1972–1974	Succeeded by Patrick Kavanagh
Preceded by John Alderson	Assistant Commissioner "D", Metropolitan Police; 1974–1978	Succeeded by John Gerrard
