= James Haughton (police officer) =

English police officer (1914–2000)

Sir James Haughton, CBE, QPM (26 February 1914 – 26 January 2000) was Chief Inspector of Constabulary from January 1976 to July 1977.

He joined Birmingham City Police in 1935, rising to become Detective Chief Superintendent. He was on the staff at the Police Staff College, Bramshill from 1963 to 1965 when he became Chief Constable of Liverpool City Police, which then expanded to include Bootle before restructuring to become Merseyside Police from 1974, of which he was Chief Constable until 1975. After his spell as Chief Inspector (1976–77) he went to Zimbabwe Rhodesia to assist with the implementation of the Lancaster House Agreement.

Police appointments
Preceded by John Hill	HM Chief Inspector of Constabulary for England, Wales and Northern Ireland; 1976 –1977	Succeeded by Colin Woods
Preceded by Position established	Chief Constable of Merseyside Police; 1974–1975	Succeeded by Kenneth Oxford
Preceded by	Chief Constable of Liverpool City Police –	Succeeded by Position abolished
