= John Alderson (police officer) =

British police officer (1922–2011)

John Alderson CBE QPM
- Born: 28 May 1922; Barnsley, West Riding of Yorkshire, England
- Died: 7 October 2011 (aged 89)
- Education: Barnsley Technical College
- Occupation: police officer
- Years active: 1955–1982
- Known for: community policing

John Cottingham Alderson (28 May 1922 – 7 October 2011) was a senior British police officer and expert on police and penal affairs.

Alderson was born in Barnsley, West Riding of Yorkshire, and educated at Barnsley Technical College. In 1938, he enlisted in the Highland Light Infantry as a boy soldier and reached the rank of Corporal before transferring to the Army Physical Training Corps in 1941. He served with the APTC in North Africa and Italy and left the Army in 1946 with the rank of Warrant Officer Class II.

He then joined the West Riding Constabulary as a Constable, representing the force in boxing and rugby. He attended the National Police College in 1954 and was promoted inspector in 1955 (after the statutory minimum nine years' service) and superintendent in 1960. In 1956, he was a British Memorial Foundation Fellow in Australia and that year he was also called to the bar by the Middle Temple. He attended the Senior Command Course at the Police College in 1963–1964 and was then appointed deputy chief constable of Dorset.

In 1966, he transferred to the Metropolitan Police in London as deputy commander (Administration and Operations) and in 1967 became second-in-command of No.3 District (North-East London). In 1968, he became deputy assistant commissioner (Training) and in 1970 was seconded as commandant of the National Police College. In 1973, he returned to London as assistant commissioner "D" (Personnel and Training), but remained in the post less than a year before being appointed chief constable of Devon and Cornwall in November 1973, where he remained until his retirement in May 1982.

While chief constable he acquired a reputation for radical ideas which were not always popular with other senior police officers, who regarded him as "soft", and was also a champion of community policing. Alderson was frequently portrayed in the media as the polar opposite to James Anderton, chief constable of Greater Manchester from 1976 to 1991, who was seen as a champion of hardline, aggressive policing and a more punitive criminal justice system.

He was awarded the Queen's Police Medal (QPM) in 1974 and appointed Commander of the Order of the British Empire (CBE) in the 1981 Birthday Honours.

He became a fellow commoner of Corpus Christi College, Cambridge, and a fellow of the Cambridge Institute of Criminology in 1982 and was also Gwilym Gibbon Research Fellow at Nuffield College, Oxford, from 1982 to 1983. He was visiting professor of police studies at the University of Strathclyde from 1983 to 1989 and a research fellow at the Institute of Police and Criminological Studies at the University of Portsmouth from 1994 to 2000. He returned to Australia in 1987 as Australian Commonwealth Fellow with the Australian Government. He often commentated on police matters in the media.

Alderson was a member of the Liberal Party and unsuccessfully contested the Devon parliamentary seat of Teignbridge in 1983. He served as a consultant on human rights to the Council of Europe from 1981 and was a member of the BBC General Advisory Council from 1971 to 1978. He also served on the committee of the Royal Humane Society from 1973 to 1981 and was president of the Royal Life-Saving Society from 1974 to 1978.

== Honours ==

Ribbon	Description	Notes
	Order of the British Empire (CBE)	1981
	Queen's Police Medal (QPM)	1974

== Footnotes ==
Police appointments
Preceded by Unknown	Deputy Chief Constable of Dorset; 1964–1966	Succeeded by Unknown
Preceded by Unknown	Deputy Commander (Administration and Operations), Metropolitan Police; 1966–1967	Succeeded by Unknown
Preceded by Unknown	Deputy Commander, No.3 District, Metropolitan Police; 1967–1968	Succeeded by Unknown
Preceded by Unknown	Deputy Assistant Commissioner (Training), Metropolitan Police; 1968–1970	Succeeded by Unknown
Preceded by Colin Woods	Commandant of the National Police College; 1970–1973	Succeeded by James Walker
Preceded by John Mastel	Assistant Commissioner "D", Metropolitan Police; 1973	Succeeded by Henry Hunt
Preceded by Ronald Greenwood	Chief Constable of Devon and Cornwall; 1973–1982	Succeeded by David East
