= Wilfred Trubshaw =

British chief constable

Wilfred Trubshaw CBE

Chief Constable of Lancashire Constabulary
- In office 5 May 1927 – 31 August 1935

Assistant Chief Constable of Lancashire Constabulary
- In office 1917 – 5 May 1927

Personal details
- Born: 15 June 1870 Mold, Flintshire, Wales
- Died: 21 December 1944 (aged 74) Pwllheli, Caernarfonshire, Wales

Wilfred Trubshaw CBE (15 June 1870 – 21 December 1944) was a British solicitor and police officer who served as Chief Constable of Lancashire Constabulary from 1927 to 1935.

Trubshaw was born in Mold, Flintshire, Wales, the eldest son of surgeon Alfred Trubshaw, and came from a wealthy Staffordshire family. He was Assistant Solicitor to Lancashire County Council until 1915, when he joined Lancashire County Constabulary as Deputy Chief Constable. He was promoted to Assistant Chief Constable in 1917 and was appointed Chief Constable on 5 May 1927. He retired on 31 August 1935 due to problems with his eyesight.

Trubshaw was appointed Officer of the Order of the British Empire (OBE) in the 1920 civilian war honours and Commander of the Order of the British Empire (CBE) in the 1931 Birthday Honours.

He married Bessie André Perkins, a writer of short stories, in Wales in 1904. He died in Pwllheli, Caernarfonshire, Wales, aged 74.

== Footnotes ==
Police appointments
Preceded by Sir Philip Lane	Chief Constable of Lancashire; 1927–1935	Succeeded by Archibald Frederick Hordern
