= James Anderton =

British police officer (1932–2022)

Sir Cyril James Anderton CBE KStJ QPM DL
- Born: 24 May 1932; Wigan, Lancashire, England
- Died: 5 May 2022 (aged 89); Manchester, England
- Occupations: Police officer, chief constable of Greater Manchester

Sir Cyril James Anderton (24 May 1932 – 5 May 2022) was a British police officer who served as chief constable of Greater Manchester from 1976 to 1991.

== Early life and career ==
Cryil James Anderton was born into a coal mining family, on 24 May 1932, in Wigan, Lancashire, where he was also brought up. He was educated at St Matthew's Church School and later at Wigan Grammar School. Anderton performed three years National Service in the Royal Military Police before joining the Manchester City Police force in 1953. He began his career as a beat constable in the Moss Side area of Manchester before being talent-spotted by Superintendent Robert Mark, who later became Commissioner of the Metropolitan Police. Anderton rose rapidly through the ranks of the Manchester City Police, studying criminology at the Victoria University of Manchester. He became a chief superintendent of Cheshire Constabulary and later the assistant chief constable of Leicestershire Constabulary. In 1975, he became deputy chief constable of the Greater Manchester Police (GMP), which had been founded a year earlier. On 23 October 1976, he was appointed chief constable, at the age of 44.

== Chief constable ==
One of Anderton's first acts as chief constable was a drive against pornography and prostitution. A special squad raided 284 bookshops, newsagents, and warehouses; confiscating a total of 160,000 magazines to a street value of £200,000. Seizures included The Sun Page Three Annual. The crackdown received support from some feminists and anti-pornography campaigners, but was criticised by civil liberties groups as a moral crusade. Anderton replied to his critics by stating that he was responding to public complaints regarding the graphic nature of the material available in shops across Greater Manchester. It has also been argued that organised-crime gangs in Manchester controlled the sale and distribution of pornographic material as well as running brothels, massage parlours, and street prostitution.

There was also a drive against late-night drinking in the city centre of Manchester with particular focus against illegal-drinking clubs and after-hours drinking in licensed bars and clubs. As a result, 24 nightclubs had their licences revoked by magistrates.

Regular patrols were also conducted into the Canal Street area of central Manchester, the centre of Manchester's gay community. Anderton was frequently criticised by gay rights activists of devoting undue attention to the policing of the area due to his alleged prejudice towards the gay community. According to The Guardian, Anderton "encouraged his officers to stalk its dank alleys and expose anyone caught in a clinch, while police motorboats with spotlights searched for gay men around the canal's locks and bridges". Anderton responded to criticism by stating that he was merely enforcing the law regarding sexual activity in public toilets and that there had been a significant number of complaints from local people regarding police inaction.

In 1977, Greater Manchester Police was the first English police force to deploy a plainclothes "decoy" squad to lure street robbers or "muggers" into the open. Anderton adopted the tactic from the New York City Police Department.

Also in 1977, Anderton ordered the creation of the Tactical Aid Group. Modelled on the Metropolitan Police's Special Patrol Group, the Tactical Aid Group (TAG) was responsible for providing Greater Manchester Police with a mobile reserve for combating public disorder and crime. The Tactical Aid Group was regularly deployed to combat football violence and disorder during demonstrations and industrial disputes. Greater Manchester Police became the leading English police force outside the Metropolitan Police for the development of public-order tactics and use of firearms.

Between 1977 and 1979, Anderton received national media attention by successfully ensuring a series of marches by the far-right National Front passed without serious incident garnering a reputation as a tough, hands-on chief constable.

During the summer of 1977, marches in Ladywood in Birmingham and Lewisham in south London had been marred by riots. After initially banning a march proposed for October 1977, he met secretly with the National Front's deputy leader, Martin Webster, and agreed to allow a march to take place if the location was kept secret. To control opposing demonstrators, GMP was placed on standby, reinforcements drafted in from neighbouring forces and helicopters deployed. The cost for this operation – the most sophisticated public-order operation in Britain up to that date – amounted to £250,000. Another two massive policing operations allowed Front meetings to take place in Hyde and Bolton town halls in January and February 1978.

=== The 1981 Moss Side riot ===
In July 1981, Anderton had to deal with the Moss Side riot. That year riots in Bristol, Brixton, and Toxteth occurred in England, with GMP officers having been sent as reinforcements to Liverpool. To avoid the high police-casualties seen in the Toxteth riots, Anderton decided not to deploy static cordons of officers with long protective shields; judging that such defensive tactics would only encourage prolonged confrontations. He instead ordered the Greater Manchester Police to be supplied with protective crash helmets, at the time the only English police force with such equipment.

When rioting broke out at Moss Side in July, GMP at first kept a low profile, while community leaders tried to defuse the situation and disperse the crowds. After two days of street disorder and looting, Anderton ordered a swift and hard intervention; sending the Tactical Aid Group (TAG) to clear the streets using a vehicle-based, rapid-dispersal strategy developed in Northern Ireland by the Royal Ulster Constabulary (RUC). The specially trained TAG officers, using snatch squads deployed from fast-moving vans, made 150 arrests in the space of two hours and quelled the disorder. Interviewed in 1992, Anderton described his strategy during the Moss Side riot,

When trouble arises and violence occurs on the street, you hit it fast and hard. And that's what we did the following night. We hit the rioters fast and hard with all the force at our disposal – legitimate and lawful force – and we crushed the riots in Manchester in 24 hours.

Greater Manchester Police's rapid and flexible mobile-response was unique in British public-order policing at that time and received much praise from the media, politicians, and the general public. The leadership of Anderton was contrasted favourably with the perceived loss of control in other constabularies. In December 1981, Anderton formed the first specialist unit within GMP based in Moss Side to investigate racially motivated violence and other crimes. This was followed later by other police forces across England, Scotland, and Wales.

=== Relationship with politicians ===
==== Cyril Smith ====
Anderton was close friends with Liberal politician Cyril Smith, who shared his traditionalist values and emphasis on law and order in the police. Speaking to the Independent Inquiry into Child Sexual Abuse in 2018, Baroness Brinton said that Gordon Lishman, a senior Liberal figure, was told in passing that Anderton had given Smith an informal warning regarding allegations Smith had sexually abused boys in Rochdale.

==== Clashes with Labour ====
During his tenure as chief constable of Greater Manchester, Anderton repeatedly clashed with the Greater Manchester Police Committee and later the Police Authority, especially with its Labour Party members. Anderton openly regarded them as part of an extensive left-wing conspiracy to overthrow British democracy.

Central to the policing philosophy of Anderton was the fear of political influence interfering with police duty especially during protests, demonstrations and industrial disputes, issues which dominated British policing during the period he was chief constable, fearing that such interference would weaken and undermine the police.

Following this particular speech, Anderton was called in front of the Greater Manchester Police Committee, where he was told to lower his public profile and to allow himself to be directed by its members regarding police operations but Anderton refused. He gave speeches in the context of attempts by Police Committees in Liverpool and in Manchester to increase their influence over operational decision making by chief constables.

Anderton was particularly criticised by members of his Police Committee for his attitude toward armed police. In 1983, he announced mobile armed patrols to counter an increase in armed robberies in Greater Manchester. These patrols later became known as Armed Response Vehicles and are now routinely used by police forces across the United Kingdom. In 1986, Anderton issued 9 mm MP5 carbines to selected officers based at Manchester Airport on security patrols. Following the riots in Brixton, Tottenham and Handsworth in 1985, Anderton announced that the Greater Manchester Police would be equipped with plastic baton rounds. Anderton justified his decision with police casualties suffered during these riots,

We have two choices in the police force – either we stay where we are and die or we ignominiously cut and run. As long as it is in my power, I have no intention of leaving my officers unprotected... I shall never abandon the citizens of Greater Manchester to the mercy of rioters, rapists, looters and criminals.

In 1986, Anderton was embroiled in national political controversy when his deputy John Stalker was suspended over allegations of his friendship with a man called Kevin Taylor, who was accused of fraud and drug-dealing through an alleged association with the Quality Street Gang when on the point of completing an official report, the Stalker Inquiry, critical of the policing policies of the Royal Ulster Constabulary.

=== Outspokenness and controversy ===
Anderton praised his officers, and warned the British public during the height of the Cold War with the Soviet Union of the threat of left-wing subversion. When challenged by left wing Labour councillors and community activists on what they believed was his heavy-handed approach as chief constable, Anderton directly confronted his opponents and accused them of subversion, undermining police morale and threatening British democracy. He also denounced some defence lawyers as belonging to a "Society for the Prevention of the Conviction of the Guilty", attacked the "Race Relations Industry" for creating tension between ethnic minority groups and the wider population and detected a threat by left-wing extremists operating in the trade union movement and in society in general. He called for the creation of a national police force – thereby abolishing local police authorities – especially in the case of monitoring British football hooliganism.

Anderton's outspoken views sparked public controversy throughout his period as chief constable of Greater Manchester. The media often depicted Anderton as the polar opposite of John Alderson, chief constable of Devon and Cornwall. While Alderson was portrayed as a liberal and progressive thinker who favoured community or "soft" policing, Anderton was often depicted as a tough, uncompromising and bombastic figure who endorsed a philosophy of "hard" paramilitary policing against crime and public disorder. Anderton disagreed with this juxtaposition, stressing that his policing in Greater Manchester was community-based.

==== Views on morality ====
"God works in mysterious ways. Given my love of God and belief in Him and Jesus Christ, I have to accept that I may well be used by God in this way."
– James Anderton

Anderton was vocal about his Christian faith – he was a Methodist lay preacher before converting to Catholicism due to the Catholic Church's stance on moral issues. It has been claimed that Anderton said he had "a direct line to God", and Anderton became known as "God's Copper" due to his views. He saw the police as a means of providing moral enforcement against "social nonconformists, malingerers, idlers, parasites, spongers, frauds, cheats and unrepentant criminals", and was a vocal opponent of gay rights, feminism, pornography and those who "openly hanker[ed] after total debauchery and lewdness". He attracted controversy due to a 1987 BBC Radio 4 interview, where he claimed to be used by God to speak out on moral issues. This led to calls for his resignation by a police monitoring committee based in Manchester, as well as Liberal and Labour MPs.

==== 1984 Miners' Strike comments ====
In March 1984, during the Miners' Strike, Anderton said of the strict curfews and patrolling of the pit villages,

It appears that the police have imposed a curfew on the community as a whole, not just on the miners, and also that they have restricted free movement. These are things we normally associate with countries behind the iron curtain. The police are getting the image of a heavy-handed mob.

==== 1986 remarks on HIV/AIDS ====
In December 1986, Anderton's remark that homosexuals, drug addicts and prostitutes who had HIV/AIDS were "swirling in a human cesspit of their own making" received widespread criticism. Lawrence Byford, Inspector of Constabulary, said, "Mr Anderton was told that some of his recent public statements had brought ridicule upon both the association and the police service and had helped fuel the case of left wing militants", adding,

He is his own worst enemy. At his best he captures the public's imagination and support when he articulates his views so persuasively but then he tends to ruin his fruitful endeavours by going too far with his extreme language and religious overtones.

==== Woman's Own interview ====
Anderton supported the reintroduction of corporal punishment for criminals saying in a December 1987 Woman's Own interview that,

Corporal punishment should be administered so that [criminals] actually beg for mercy. They should be punished until they repent of their sins. I'd thrash some criminals myself, most surely.

Anderton also called for the castration of rapists and renewed his attack on gay men, saying,

The law of the land allows consenting adult homosexuals to engage in sexual practices which I think should be criminal offences. Sodomy between males is an abhorrent offence, condemned by the word of God, and ought to be against the criminal law.

He did comment that capital punishment was not a deterrent and "it serves no purpose to shorten one person's life. We are all going to die".

== Death ==
Anderton died from a urinary tract infection at Wythenshawe Hospital in Manchester, on 5 May 2022, aged 89.

== Public perception ==
Anderton was and remains a deeply polarising figure in both British policing and in the history of Manchester. Many sections of public opinion admired his outspoken and independent style of leadership as well as his tough approach to policing and crime. Other sections viewed Anderton as a populist, reactionary, autocratic chief constable, insensitive to the concerns of minority groups, who personified an authoritarian style of policing. Anderton's pronouncements on public morality led to frequent accusations by his critics of bigotry and religious fanaticism.

Anderton was also able to count on the support of the Conservative government of Margaret Thatcher. According to documents released in 2012, Thatcher had supported Anderton after he made his AIDS remark and used her position to prevent an inquiry into his conduct. His outspokenness might have cost him an appointment as Commissioner of the Metropolitan Police. Anderton was seen as a potential successor to David McNee in 1982 and a leading contender following the retirement of Kenneth Newman in 1987.

Anderton served as president of the Association of Chief Police Officers from 1986 to 1987 and received a knighthood in 1990, before retiring the following year.

== Depiction in popular culture ==
Anderton was often depicted in fiction, almost universally in a critical fashion. In 1990, the BBC musical satire on Margaret Thatcher Ten Glorious Years showed actor Ricky Tomlinson portray James Anderton in the style of a US-style Moral Majority television evangelist preaching against "Poofs" and "Pinkos". In the same year, the Happy Mondays song "God's Cop" (from their album Pills 'n' Thrills and Bellyaches) lampooned Anderton.

In the same vein, Anderton was also the – sometimes thinly veiled – inspiration of various fictional characters. In the first season of the Rik Mayall satire The New Statesman, police chief Sir Malachi Jellicoe (John Woodvine) believed himself to be in direct contact with Jesus and to be doing His will on earth. One of many anti-Semitic characters in David Britton's 1989 satirical novel Lord Horror was chief constable "James Appleton", who recites Anderton's AIDS remark verbatim except replacing the word "homosexuals" with "Jews". The novel was seized from the publisher by Greater Manchester Police under the Obscene Publications Act 1959, and a ban for anti-Semitism imposed but later overturned.

== Awards and decorations ==
- Queen's Police Medal (1977)
- Deputy Lieutenant for Greater Manchester (13 February 1989)
- Knight Bachelor (1990)
- Commander of the Most Excellent Order of the British Empire in the 1982 Birthday Honours
- Knight of Grace of the Most Venerable Order of the Hospital of Saint John of Jerusalem
- Companion of the British Institute of Management (CBMI)

Police appointments
Preceded by William James Richards	Chief Constable of Greater Manchester Police; 1976–1991	Succeeded by David Wilmot
