= John Gerrard (police officer) =

British police officer (1920–2003)

John Henry Gerrard CBE MC KStJ QPM (25 November 1920 – 2 June 2003) was a British police officer with the London Metropolitan Police.

Gerrard was the son of Archie Reginald Gerrard (himself a Metropolitan Police officer) and his wife Evelyn. He was educated at Cordwainers' Technical College and enlisted in the British Army in 1939, serving in Iceland from 1940 to 1942. On 20 March 1943, he was commissioned as a second lieutenant in the Middlesex Regiment and served with the 1st Battalion until he was demobilised with the rank of captain in 1946. He was awarded the Military Cross (MC) as a lieutenant on 1 March 1945 for gallantry in North-West Europe.

In 1946, he joined the Metropolitan Police as a constable. He was promoted sergeant in 1951, inspector at Hammersmith in 1955, chief inspector soon afterwards, superintendent at West End Central in 1961 and chief superintendent soon afterwards. In 1965, he was promoted commander and took command of West End Central. In 1968, he was appointed Commander (Public Order and Operations) and in February 1970 was promoted to Deputy Assistant Commissioner (Public Order and Operations). On 15 June 1974, he was in command of the public order operation in Red Lion Square which resulted in the death of Kevin Gately.

In 1974, he took over No.1 Area and on 1 January 1978 he was appointed Assistant Commissioner "D" (Personnel and Training), a post he held until his retirement in 1981.

Gerrard was appointed Officer of the Order of the British Empire (OBE) in the 1972 New Year Honours, awarded the Queen's Police Medal (QPM) in the 1975 New Year Honours, and appointed Commander of the Order of the British Empire (CBE) in the 1981 New Year Honours.

From 1983 to 1986, Gerrard was London District Commissioner of the St John Ambulance Brigade. He was appointed Knight of Grace of the Order of St John (KStJ) in 1986. He married Gladys Hefford in 1943; they had two sons.

== Footnotes ==
Police appointments
Preceded by Unknown	Commander, West End Central, Metropolitan Police; 1965–1968	Succeeded by Unknown
Preceded by Unknown	Commander (Public Order & Operations), Metropolitan Police; 1968–1970	Succeeded by Unknown
Preceded by John Lawlor	Deputy Assistant Commissioner (Public Order & Operations), Metropolitan Police; 1970–1974	Succeeded by Unknown
Preceded by Unknown	Deputy Assistant Commissioner, No.1 Area, Metropolitan Police; 1974–1978	Succeeded by Unknown
Preceded by Henry Hunt	Assistant Commissioner "D", Metropolitan Police; 1978–1981	Succeeded by Geoffrey Dear
