= 1969 Investiture Honours =

British government recognitions

The 1969 Investiture Honours were appointments made by Queen Elizabeth II of the United Kingdom to various orders and honours released on 7 July 1969, on the occasion of the investiture of her eldest son, Charles (now Charles III), as Prince of Wales. The awards were of a special character compared to most honours lists, in that the awardees were selected due to their links with Wales, or involvement with the investiture ceremony itself.

== Knights Bachelor ==
- David Joseph Davies, Chairman, Wales Tourist Board.
- Geraint Llewellyn Evans CBE. For services to Music.
- Robert Charles Evans FRCS, Principal, University College of North Wales, Bangor. For services to Mountaineering.
- The Reverend Albert Evans-Jones CBE (Cynan). For services to Welsh Literature.
- Archibald James Lush. For social services to Wales.

== Royal Victorian Order ==
=== Knight Grand Cross (GCVO) ===
- Rt Hon. Antony Charles Robert, Earl of Snowdon

=== Knight Commander (KCVO) ===
- Goronwy Hopkin Daniel CB
- Lieutenant-Colonel William Jones Williams OBE

=== Commander (CVO) ===
- Squadron Leader David John Checketts MVO
- Major Francis Jones TD
- Robert Hefin Jones

=== Member (MVO) ===
At this time the two lowest classes of the Royal Victorian Order were "Member (fourth class)" and "Member (fifth class)", both with post-nominal letters MVO. "Member (fourth class)" was renamed "Lieutenant" (LVO) from the 1985 New Year Honours onwards.

Fourth Class

- John Philip Brooke Brooke-Little
- Lieutenant-Colonel Rodney Onslow Dennys OBE
- Lieutenant-Colonel Sidney Goodchild

Fifth Class

- 22714520 Warrant Officer Class I, Gordon Ivor Amphlett, The Royal Regiment of Wales (24th/41st Foot).
- Michael Corfield
- Henry Gray

== Order of the British Empire ==
=== Dame Commander (DBE) ===
Civil Division

- Lady Olwen Elizabeth Carey Evans. For public services in Wales.

=== Commander (CBE) ===
Military Division

Royal Navy

- Captain Robert Gwilym Lewis-Jones RN

Civil Division

- Ivor Egwad Jones JP. For services to Rugby Football.
- John Eryl Owen-Jones, Clerk of the Caernarvonshire County Council.

=== Officer (OBE) ===
Civil Division

- Thomas Gwynne Davies, Borough Engineer and Surveyor, Royal Borough of Caernarvon.
- Arwel Hughes, Head of Music, Welsh Region, British Broadcasting Corporation.
- Tegid Lloyd Roberts, County Surveyor, Caernarvonshire County Council.
- John Oswald Smith, Town Clerk, Royal Borough of Caernarvon.
- Carl Toms, Stage and Interior Designer.
- John Spark Wilson, Commander, Metropolitan Police.

=== Member (MBE) ===
Civil Division

- John Langran Pound, Principal Design Officer, Ministry of Public Building and Works.

== British Empire Medal (BEM) ==
Military Division

Army

- Lance-Corporal John Swaine, Corps of Royal Engineers.

Civil Division

- David Morris Jones, Head Custodian, Caernarvon Castle.
