= Edward Dodd (police officer) =

Sir Edward Dodd CBE QPM OStJ

Chief Constable of City of Birmingham Police
- In office 1945–1963

Personal details
- Awards: CBE; OStJ; QPM

Sir Edward James Dodd, CBE, OStJ, QPM (19 October 1909 – 16 September 1966) was Chief Inspector of Constabulary from 1963 until his death.

Dodd was educated at Reading School and HMS Conway. He served with the Merchant Navy and the Royal Naval Reserve from 1925 to 1931. He was with the Metropolitan Police from 1931 to 1941. He was the 2nd Assistant Chief Constable of the Birmingham City Police from 1941 to 1944, the 1st Assistant Chief Constable from 1944 to 1945 and Chief Constable from 1945 to 1963.

He was appointed a Commander of the Order of the British Empire (CBE) in the 1949 Birthday Honours received the Queen's Police Medal (QPM) in the 1958 New Year Honours, and was made a Knight Bachelor in the 1964 New Year Honours.

Police appointments
Preceded by William Johnson	HM Chief Inspector of Constabulary for England, Wales and Northern Ireland; 1963 –1966	Succeeded by Eric St Johnston
Preceded by William Johnson	Chief Constable of Birmingham City Police; 1945 – 1963	Succeeded by William Derrick Capper
