= John Gerrard =

John Gerrard or Gerard may refer to:

- John Gerard (c. 1545–1612), English herbalist
- John Gerard (Jesuit) (1564–1637), English Jesuit priest
- John Gerard (Royalist) (1632–1654), Royalist during the English Civil War
- John Gerrard (1720–1787), American Baptist preacher and church founder, after whom Gerrardstown, West Virginia is named
- John Gerrard (police officer) (1920–2003), British police officer
- Jon Gerrard (born 1947), Canadian politician and doctor
- John M. Gerrard (born 1953), American judge
- John Gerrard (artist) (born 1974), Irish artist
