= Kenneth Oxford =

Sir Kenneth Gordon Oxford CBE QPM (25 June 1924 – 23 November 1998) was a senior British police officer and chief constable of Merseyside Police from 1976 to 1989.

== Life ==
=== Early life ===
Kenneth Oxford was born in Camberwell, London, and educated at Caldicott School, Lambeth. He joined the Royal Air Force during the Second World War in 1942 and served with RAF Bomber Command in southeast Asia until 1947. Oxford joined the Metropolitan Police after leaving the RAF, and within six months was transferred to CID to become a detective. In 1961 Oxford, by then a Sergeant, was bagman to Superintendent Basil Montague (Bob) Acott (1913 – 2001) in the A6 Murder investigation that led to the conviction of James Hanratty.

In 1963 he took part in the Profumo affair investigation, arresting Christine Keeler on suspicion of perjury and conspiracy to pervert the course of justice. In 1966, as a Detective Chief Inspector Oxford assisted Detective Superintendent Charles Hewett in the investigation into the theft of pictures worth £2.75 million from the Dulwich Picture Gallery. In 1969 Oxford transferred to Northumbria Police to become its assistant chief constable.

=== Merseyside ===
He was appointed deputy chief constable of Merseyside Police in 1974, and became chief constable in 1976. His tenure of the latter role was beset by controversy. From his appointment Oxford made a clear commitment to improving the manpower, facilities and structure of the Merseyside force. He also expanded beat policing at the expense of mobile patrols as a means of improving police/public relations.

One of Oxford's first decisions as Chief Constable was to disband his force's "Task Force", a mobile support unit modeled on the Metropolitan Police's Special Patrol Group (SPG) which had gained a reputation for excessive force and harassment among Liverpool's black community. Oxford received the congratulations of the Merseyside Community Relations Council for scrapping the "Task Force", which he felt himself had been responsible for some heavy-handed tactics.

By the late 1970s the relationship between Merseyside Police and parts of deprived communities in Liverpool had plummeted, and a series of incidents of alleged excessive force culminated in the death of Jimmy Kelly in June 1979. Kelly, who had been arrested for being drunk and disorderly, died in custody, and witnesses alleged that they had seen officers assaulting him. More allegations of police brutality followed, and the local MP, Sir Harold Wilson, called for a public inquiry. Oxford responded to the wave of pressure that followed with a staunch refusal to discuss the case with his police committee which included both Tory and Labour groups of Liverpool City Council. The most vociferous of these critics was Margaret Simey, who led the Labour Group on the Police Committee. Simey had previously voiced concerns over what she saw as overly forceful and aggressive policing by Merseyside police and pushed hard for an inquiry. Oxford responded in his annual report by referring to "vituperative, misinformed comment made by members of the County Council, but more unfortunately by members of the Police Committee".

Oxford was a passionate advocate of the operational independence of Chief Constables and resented any demand from the Police Committee to justify his decisions. He openly regarded criticisms by elected councillors and community leaders as a politically motivated assault upon the police service. Oxford, together with James Anderton, Chief Constable of Greater Manchester, became the focal point for a debate over police accountability that raged throughout the 1980s and remains unresolved to this day. Oxford was appointed a Commander of the Order of the British Empire (CBE) in the 1981 Birthday Honours.

Within the Merseyside force, Oxford was viewed as a tough and forthright Chief Constable who supported his officers against unfair and politically motivated critics. Oxford was viewed as an advocate of a "hard policing" style which relied on the intensive use of stop and search powers by police to combat street crime and violence. Outsiders, however, saw his management style as abrasive and suggested Oxford lacked the sensitivity required in a modern Chief Constable. In 1981 Oxford responded to critics of his management style "if I am arrogant then the spice of arrogance is a necessary constituent of command".

As Chairman of the Association of Chief Police Officers (ACPO) 1982/83, Oxford retained both the national spotlight and the antipathy of his Police Committee. Critics of the police and in particular opponents of his view of democratic accountability were branded as extremists. The miners' strike of 1984/85 saw the Merseyside Police Committee unsuccessfully attempt to impose an injunction upon Oxford to prevent Merseyside officers providing mutual aid to other forces. They also failed in their efforts to stop Oxford from equipping his force with improved riot control equipment or obtaining plastic bullets.

Oxford opposed the Police and Criminal Evidence Act of 1984 as undermining police effectiveness against crime. Oxford was knighted in 1988 and retired from the force the following year. After his retirement Oxford was named by Alison Halford as practising "tactics of exclusion" during her fight to gain promotion within the Merseyside Police.

==== Toxteth Riots ====
On 8 July 1981 clashes broke out between police and youths in the Liverpool 8 (Toxteth) district of the city. Over the weekend that followed, the disturbance escalated into full-scale rioting, with pitched battles between police and youths in which petrol bombs and paving stones were thrown. During the violence milk floats were set on fire and directed at police lines. Rioters were also observed using scaffolding poles to charge police lines. Oxford had issued his officers with long protective shields, but these proved inadequate in protecting officers from missile attacks and in particular the effects of petrol bombs. Such was the scale of the rioting in Toxteth that police reinforcements were drafted in from forces across England including Greater Manchester, Lancashire, Cumbria, Birmingham and even Devon to try to control the unrest. The overwhelming majority of officers were not trained either in using the shields or in public order tactics other than forming static lines. The sole offensive tactic available to officers, the baton charge, proved increasingly ineffective in driving back the attacking crowds of rioters.

At 02:15 hours on Monday 6 July Oxford gave the order to deploy CS gas against the rioters. Merseyside police fired between 25 and 30 CS gas grenades for the first time in the UK outside Northern Ireland. The gas succeeded in dispersing the crowds.

A second wave of rioting began on 27 July 1981 and continued into the early hours of 28 July, with police once again being attacked with missiles and a number of cars being set alight. However, on this occasion the Merseyside force responded by driving vans and land rovers at high speed into the crowds quickly dispersing them. This "mobile pursuit tactic" had been developed as a riot control technique in Northern Ireland by the Royal Ulster Constabulary and had been employed with success in quelling the Moss Side riots by the Greater Manchester Police. A local man David Moore died after being struck by a police van trying to clear crowds and another was disabled after being run over by a Land Rover. Oxford responded to critics of "mobile pursuit" by telling journalists "they can see the vehicles coming and they know what will happen if they get in the way."

In the aftermath of the rioting Oxford responded to his critics and to Margaret Simey in particular by blaming the riots on "hooligans", and stated that his decision to use CS gas had saved Liverpool city centre from being looted. In the respite provided by the Scarman Report Oxford repeated his long-held belief that Liverpool's violent and multi-racial culture required a tough policing style. There were several demonstrations by Liverpool 8 residents and left wing activists calling for Oxford's sacking as Chief Constable of Merseyside.

During this period a deal was struck between Margaret Simey and the Home Secretary, William Whitelaw, which involved a toning-down of criticisms of Oxford's riot tactics in exchange for his removal as Chief Constable. However, ACPO and the Police Federation made clear that they considered this totally unacceptable, ensuring Whitelaw's support for Oxford. After this incident Simey's influence upon Merseyside politics was significantly reduced. She had also been subject to intense media criticism as being overly critical of police while not condemning the rioters.

Police appointments
Preceded by Sir James Haughton	Chief constable of Merseyside Police; 1976 – 1989	Succeeded by Sir James Sharples
