= Abbeydale Grange School =

Coordinates: 53.348°N 1.496°W

Location
- Hastings Road; Sheffield, South Yorkshire, S7 2GU; England

Information
- Type: Comprehensive
- Motto: Excellence, Achievement, Diversity
- Established: 1958
- Closed: 2010
- Local authority: City of Sheffield
- Specialist: Media Arts
- Department for Education URN: 107137 Tables
- Ofsted: Reports
- Head teacher: Jan Featherstone (Executive Headteacher)
- Gender: Co-educational
- Age: 11 to 16
- Enrolment: 90
- Houses: Air, Earth, Fire and Water

Abbeydale Grange School was a mixed comprehensive school in Sheffield, England, established in 1969 and closed after the 2009/10 academic year, after being listed amongst the schools with the worst GCSE examination results.

== Admissions ==
The school was set in a green site off Abbeydale Road (part of the A621), a short bus journey from Sheffield city centre. It served both the local area and the wider city community.

=== Upper school ===
The Upper School was north of the Lower School site.

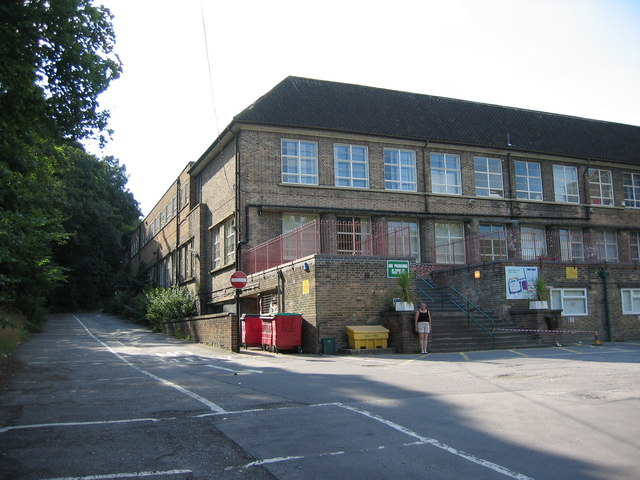
The former Upper School site in August 2003

=== Lower school ===
The Lower School site closed in July 2010, and was adjacent, to the south of the Upper School site.

=== Redevelopment ===
After the School was closed the site was cleared, and in 2016 it was announced that a new housing development was to be constructed on the former lower school land.

== History ==
=== Grammar school ===
The school can be traced to one pre-existing school before World War II: Abbeydale Grammar School for Girls and the 1958 founded boys' Grange Grammar School, housed in two former mansions called Holt House and Grange House respectively, on Abbeydale Road in Millhouses. The first was subsequently merged into Hurlfields Girls' Grammar School in 1947 and in 1954 the merged school on this site was renamed Grange Girls' Grammar School.

Abbeydale Boys' Grammar School was established nearby in 1958. The building of this school had begun in 1956 and was the replacement for Nether Edge Grammar School which had been founded in 1927.

In 1969 Abbeydale Grange School (a mixed comprehensive school) was formed from the merger of Grange Girls' Grammar School and Abbeydale Boys' Grammar School.

=== Comprehensive ===
The comprehensive school was closed in 2010 because of its poor exam results.

== Notable alumni ==
- Sebastian Coe (Now Baron Coe, of Ranmore), multi-gold medal-winning Olympic athlete and former chair of the UK Olympic Committee
- Kevin Davies, ex-footballer
- Mukhtar Mohammed, Middle-distance runner
- Gerald Phiri, Zambian 100 m sprinter who qualified for the semi-finals of the London 2012 Olympic Games
- Si Spencer, television dramatist and graphic novelist

=== Abbeydale Boys' Grammar School ===
- Paul Blomfield, Labour MP since 2010 for Sheffield Central
- Dr Peter Briggs OBE, chief executive from 1990 to 2002 of the British Association for the Advancement of Science (since 2009 known as the British Science Association), and principal from 2002 to 2009 of Southlands College, Roehampton
- Chris Spedding Guitarist
- Sir Keith Povey, HM Chief Inspector of Constabulary from 2002 to 2005, chief constable from 1993 to 1997 of Leicestershire Constabulary
- Peter Wheeler, chemical engineer

=== Abbeydale Grammar School for Girls ===
- Sue Biggs, chief executive since 2010 of the Royal Horticultural Society (RHS)
- Lorna Binns, watercolour artist
- Valerie Howarth, Baroness Howarth of Breckland OBE, founder director from 1987 to 2001 of ChildLine
- Margaret Spurr OBE, president from 1985 to 1986 of the Girls' Schools Association, and a governor from 1993 to 1998 of the BBC

=== Nether Edge Grammar School ===
- Sir Leslie Fletcher DSC, chairman from 1989 to 1994 of Westland Group and from 1992 to 1995 of the Rank Organisation
- Jack Smith, artist
- Bob Stirling, rugby player
- Prof Charles Tottle, professor of medical engineering from 1975 to 1978 at the University of Bath, professor of metallurgy from 1959 to 1967 at the University of Manchester
- Thomas Ward, artist

=== Abbeydale Secondary Modern School ===
- Bill Michie, Labour MP from 1983 to 2001 for Sheffield Heeley

== Former teachers ==
- Susan Horner, director of curriculum from 2009 to 2010 at the QCA, now the Qualifications and Curriculum Development Agency (English teacher from 1974 to 1979)
- Eileen Stamers-Smith, headmistress from 1984 to 1985 of Malvern Girls' College (taught English at the girls' grammar school from 1952 to 1957)

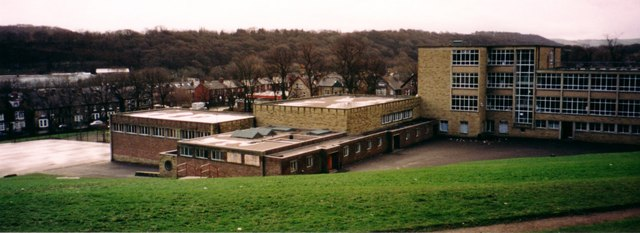
Former Lower School site (near the Tesco in Abbeydale) in January 1999
