= William Johnson (police officer) =

English police officer

Sir William Clarence Johnson, CMG, CBE, QPM (8 May 1899 – 9 March 1982) was an eminent English police officer.

Johnson was born in Eastbourne, Sussex, in 1899, and educated at Willowfield. Though underage, in August 1914 when the First World War broke out he enlisted in the British Army, eventually reaching the rank of Lieutenant with the Royal Engineers.

He joined Portsmouth City Police in 1920. He was promoted to sergeant in 1924 and five years later was promoted to inspector and chief clerk. In 1931, he was appointed superintendent in charge of the Headquarters' Division. In 1932, he was appointed as Chief Constable of Plymouth City Police. He became Assistant Chief Constable of Birmingham City Police in 1936. He was appointed Chief Constable in Birmingham in 1941. He served with Her Majesty's Inspectorate of Constabulary from 1945 to 1963, including roles as Inspector General of the Colonial Police from 1948 to 1951, chairman of the Police Salaries Commission, Malta, in 1960. In 1962–63, he was Her Majesty's Inspectorate of Constabulary inaugural Chief.

He was appointed Officer of the Order of the British Empire in 1936 and Commander of the same order in 1945. In 1951, he was appointed a Companion of the Order of St Michael and St George. He was knighted in 1957.

In 1918, he married Louisa May Humphreys. He died at a Worthing nursing home, aged 82.

Police appointments
Preceded by Inaugural appointment	HM Chief Inspector of Constabulary for England, Wales and Northern Ireland; 1962 –1963	Succeeded by Edward Dodd
Preceded by Cecil Charles Hudson Moriarty	Chief Constable of Birmingham City Police; 1941 – 1945	Succeeded by Edward Dodd
