= Patrick Kavanagh (police officer) =

British police chief

Patrick Bernard Kavanagh CBE QPM (18 March 1923 – 11 December 2013) was a senior British police officer.

Kavanagh was educated at St. Aloysius' College, Glasgow. He served in the Rifle Brigade from 1941 to 1943 and the Parachute Regiment from 1943 to 1946, ending his service as a Lieutenant. In 1946, he joined the Manchester City Police as a Constable. He rose through the ranks to Superintendent, and in 1964 was appointed Assistant Chief Constable of Cardiff City Police. When it amalgamated to form South Wales Constabulary in 1969 he became ACC of the new force and was promoted Deputy Chief Constable in 1972.

On 1 January 1974, he was appointed Assistant Commissioner "B" (Traffic) in the Metropolitan Police and was awarded the Queen's Police Medal (QPM) in the 1974 New Year Honours.

Kavanagh was appointed Commander of the Order of the British Empire (CBE) in the 1977 New Year Honours. On 1 August 1977, he was promoted to Deputy Commissioner. He retired in 1983 and died in 2013, aged 90.

== Footnotes ==
Police appointments
Preceded by Unknown	Assistant Chief Constable, Cardiff City Police; 1964–1969	Succeeded by Unknown
Preceded by Unknown	Assistant Chief Constable, South Wales Constabulary; 1969–1972	Succeeded by Unknown
Preceded by Unknown	Deputy Chief Constable, South Wales Constabulary; 1972–1974	Succeeded by Unknown
Preceded by Henry Hunt	Assistant Commissioner "B", Metropolitan Police; 1974–1977	Succeeded by Jock Wilson
Preceded by Sir Colin Woods	Deputy Commissioner of Police of the Metropolis; 1977–1983	Succeeded by Albert Laugharne
