= Serena Kennedy =

Dame Serena Kennedy DBE KPM DL

Chief constable of Merseyside Police
- In office 12 April 2021 – 31 August 2025
- Preceded by: Sir Andy Cooke
- Succeeded by: Rob Carden

Personal details
- Education: University of Hull, Cambridge Institute of Criminology
- Profession: Police officer

Dame Serena Margaret Kennedy is a retired British police officer who was chief constable of Merseyside Police from 2021 until 2025. During her time as Merseyside's first female chief constable, Kennedy's force dealt with the 2024 Southport stabbings, and the murder of Olivia Pratt-Korbel. She has served as a deputy lieutenant for Merseyside since 2025.

== Career ==
After growing up in Ormskirk and then graduating from the University of Hull with a degree in applied biology, Kennedy joined the Greater Manchester Police in 2013. She completed a master's degree in leadership and policing from Cambridge Institute of Criminology in 2017 and joined Merseyside Police as assistant chief constable, promoted a year later to deputy chief constable in 2018, and then chief constable in 2021, succeeding Sir Andy Cooke.

Kennedy was awarded the King's Police Medal in the King's Birthday Honours for 2023. She was appointed as a deputy lieutenant for Merseyside in 2025. She retired in August 2025, succeeded by Rob Carden. She was appointed as a Dame Commander of the Order of the British Empire in the King's Birthday Honours for 2026.

Police appointments
Preceded by Sir Andy Cooke	Chief constable of Merseyside Police; 2021—2025	Succeeded by Rob Carden
