= John Gaskain =

John Stuart Hinton Gaskain (11 May 1910 – 16 November 1971) was commandant of the National Police College from January 1966 to July 1968.

Gaskain was educated at Haileybury. He joined the Metropolitan Police in 1936. He qualified as a barrister in 1944. He was assistant chief constable of Norfolk Police from 1942 to 1952; chief constable of the Cumberland and Westmorland force from 1952 to 1959; and chief constable of Gloucestershire from 1960 to 1962. He joined Her Majesty's Inspectorate of Constabulary in 1962.
