= Wilford Gibson =

British police chief

Wilford Henry Gibson CBE QPM (12 October 1924 – 30 July 2001) was a British police officer in the London Metropolitan Police.

Gibson served as a signaller with the Royal Air Force from 1943 to 1947. In 1947 he joined the Metropolitan Police as a Constable. He was promoted Inspector in 1960, Superintendent in 1965, and Commander in 1971.

In 1974, Gibson was promoted Deputy Assistant Commissioner (Operations), in which role he commanded police operations in the Knightsbridge Spaghetti House Siege in September 1975 and the Balcombe Street Siege in December 1975. He was awarded the Queen's Police Medal (QPM) in the 1976 Birthday Honours.

On 1 August 1977, he was appointed Assistant Commissioner "A" (Operations and Administration). He was appointed Commander of the Order of the British Empire (CBE) in the 1980 New Year Honours and retired in 1984.

== Footnotes ==
Police appointments
Preceded by Unknown	Deputy Assistant Commissioner (Operations), Metropolitan Police; 1974–1977	Succeeded by Unknown
Preceded by John Mastel	Assistant Commissioner "A", Metropolitan Police; 1977–1984	Succeeded by Geoffrey Dear
