= Gilbert Kelland =

British police officer

Gilbert James Kelland CBE QPM (17 March 1924 – 30 August 1997) was a British police officer in the Metropolitan Police in London.

Kelland grew up in North Devon and was educated at Georgeham Church School and Braunton Secondary Modern School. He served in the Fleet Air Arm in the Second World War from 1942 to 1946, when he joined the Metropolitan Police as a Constable. He passed his Inspector's course in 1955 and was an Inspector by 1958, when he was working in the vice squad. In 1959 he was promoted Chief Inspector, still in vice. By 1964 he was a Superintendent and in 1968 he was president of the Superintendents' Association. In 1969 he went to the United States to study American law enforcement on a Ford Fellowship.

By 1971 he had been promoted Commander. As a Deputy Assistant Commissioner, he was awarded the Queen's Police Medal (QPM) in the 1975 New Year Honours. Later that year, in command of A10 (Complaints Investigation) Branch, he led the investigation into corruption in the Obscene Publications Squad. In February 1977 he was appointed Assistant Commissioner "C", in charge of the Criminal Investigation Department (CID). He was appointed Commander of the Order of the British Empire (CBE) in the 1978 Birthday Honours and retired in 1984. He was British representative to Interpol from 1977 to 1984.

He wrote Crime in London, published in 1986–1987. Kelland was an enthusiastic freemason and a founder member in 1986 of the Manor of St James, a lodge which was solely for Metropolitan Police officers who had worked in the West End of London.

== Footnotes ==
Police appointments
Preceded by Jock Wilson	Assistant Commissioner "C", Metropolitan Police; 1977–1984	Succeeded by John Dellow
