= John Mastel =

British police officer

Royston John Mastel CVO CBE (30 May 1917 – 7 April 1998) was a British police officer in the London Metropolitan Police.

Mastel was educated at Tottenham Grammar School and joined the Metropolitan Police as a Constable in 1937. He served as a pilot in the Royal Air Force Volunteer Reserve from 1941 to 1945, being commissioned from the rank of Flight Sergeant in May 1944 and promoted Flying Officer in November 1944. Rejoining the police, he was promoted Sergeant in 1946, Inspector in 1951, and Superintendent in 1955. In 1966 he was promoted Commander and made second-in-command of No.2 District. He was appointed Commander of the Order of the British Empire (CBE) in the 1969 Birthday Honours, having been promoted Deputy Assistant Commissioner (Personnel).

In 1972, he was appointed Assistant Commissioner "D" (Personnel and Training) and in October 1972 he took over as Assistant Commissioner "A" (Operations and Administration). He retired on 31 December 1976 and was appointed Commander of the Royal Victorian Order (CVO) in the 1977 Birthday Honours.

== Footnotes ==
Police appointments
Preceded by Unknown	Commander, No.2 District, Metropolitan Police; 1966–?	Succeeded by Unknown
Preceded by Unknown	Deputy Assistant Commissioner (Personnel), Metropolitan Police ?–1972	Succeeded by Unknown
Preceded by John Hill	Assistant Commissioner "D", Metropolitan Police; 1972	Succeeded by John Alderson
Preceded by James Starritt	Assistant Commissioner "A", Metropolitan Police; 1972–1976	Succeeded by Wilford Gibson
