= James Crane (police officer) =

British police officer

Sir James William Donald Crane (1 January 1921 – 29 November 1994) was a British police officer who served as HM Inspector of Constabulary from 1976 to 1979; and HM Chief Inspector of Constabulary for England and Wales 1979–82.

After wartime service with the Royal Hampshire Regiment, he joined the Metropolitan Police in 1946.

By the early 1970s he was the Commander of the Fraud Squad. He was promoted to Deputy Assistant Commissioner and it was in this role that on 19 July 1972 he began the Poulson investigation. At the time this was the UK's biggest ever corruption inquiry: it eventually led to the resignation of Reginald Maudling, then Home Secretary and notionally in charge of the police. In 1973 Crane arrested Poulson who was later convicted.

As Chief Inspector of the Constabulary, Crane was also involved in investigating the failings of the hunt for the Yorkshire Ripper.

In 1977 he was appointed a CBE. In the 1980 Birthday Honours he was appointed a knight bachelor, which was conferred on 23 July 1980 at Buckingham Palace.

Police appointments
Preceded by Colin Woods	HM Chief Inspector of Constabulary for England, Wales and Northern Ireland; 1979 –1982	Succeeded by Lawrence Byford
