= Merseyside Police =

English territorial police force

- Abbreviation: Merpol

Agency overview
- Formed: 1974; 52 years ago
- Preceding agency: Liverpool and Bootle Constabulary
- Employees: 6,451
- Volunteers: 456
- Annual budget: £401.3 million

Jurisdictional structure
- Operations jurisdiction: Merseyside, England
- Map of Merseyside Police's jurisdiction
- Area: 250 square miles (650 km^{2})
- Population: 1,423,065
- Legal jurisdiction: England & Wales
- Constituting instrument: Police Act 1996
- General nature: Local civilian police

Operational structure
- Overseen by: His Majesty's Inspectorate of Constabulary and Fire & Rescue Services; Independent Office for Police Conduct
- Constables: 3,909 (of which 120 are special constables)
- Police Community Support Officers: 237
- Police and Crime Commissioner responsible: Emily Spurrell
- Agency executive: Rob Carden, Chief Constable
- Basic Command Units: 4

Website
- www.merseyside.police.uk

Merseyside Police is the territorial police force responsible for policing Merseyside in North West England. The service area is 647 square kilometres with a population of around 1.5 million. As of September 2017 the service has 3,484 police officers, 1,619 police staff, 253 police community support officers, 155 designated officers and 208 special constables. The force is led by Chief Constable Rob Carden.

== History ==
The service came into being in 1974 when Merseyside was created, and is a successor to the Liverpool and Bootle Constabulary (itself formed in 1967 by a merger of the Liverpool City Police with the Bootle Borough Police), along with parts of Cheshire Constabulary and Lancashire Constabulary. A proposal to merge the force with the Cheshire Constabulary to form a strategic police force was made by the Home Secretary on 6 February 2006 but later abandoned.

Merseyside maintained in 2018 it could lose 300 officers, reducing the force to 3,172. This would be a 31% reduction since 2010 when there were 4,616 officers.

=== Chief constables ===
- 1974–1975 – Sir James Haughton
- 1976–1989 – Sir Kenneth Oxford
- 1989–1998 – Sir James Sharples
- 1998–2004 – Sir Norman Bettison
- 2004–2009 – Sir Bernard Hogan-Howe
- October 2009 – January 2010 – Bernard Lawson (Acting Chief Constable)
- February 2010 – June 2016 – Sir Jonathan Murphy
- July 2016 – April 2021 – Andy Cooke
- April 2021 – August 2025 – Serena Kennedy
- September 2025 – present – Rob Carden

=== Officers killed in the line of duty ===
The Police Roll of Honour Trust and Police Memorial Trust list and commemorate all British police officers killed in the line of duty. Since its establishment in 1984, the Police Memorial Trust has erected 50 memorials nationally to some of those officers.

The following officers of Merseyside Police are listed by the Trust as having died during the time of their service, since the force was established in 1974:

- PC Francis Knight, 1974 (killed in a motorcycle crash returning home from duty in stormy weather)
- PC Raymond Davenport, 1981 (fatally injured when dragged by a stolen car while attempting to arrest the driver; posthumously awarded the Queen's Commendation for Brave Conduct)
- PC Norman Harold Jones, 1983 (killed when struck by a car while at the scene of a motorway accident)
- PC James William Byers, 1983 (killed when struck by a car while at the scene of a motorway accident)
- PC William Marshall, 1986 (died as a result of internal injuries received during rioting in 1981)
- PC Mark Paul Shelton, 1987 (fatally injured in a vehicle collision on a police motorcycle course)
- Sergeant Douglas Charles Beggs, 1987 (killed in a vehicle collision leaving the Mersey Tunnel while going off duty)
- PC John Shevlin, 1997 (died following two years in a coma after his police car crashed)
- PC Gary Clarke, 2001 (killed when he was struck by a car while cycling home from work)
- PC David Thomas Shreeve, 2005 (killed in a motorway collision on a police motorcycle training course)
- PC Neil Doyle, 2014 (killed off duty during police Christmas party after an assault in Liverpool city centre)
- PC David Phillips, 2015 (died as a result of internal injuries received when hit by a stolen car he was attempting to stop in Wallasey)
- PC Paul Briggs, 2017 (killed due to a car travelling on the wrong side of the road which struck his motorcycle as he reported to duty in 2015, receiving extensive injuries from which he never recovered)

== Governance ==
Merseyside Police is overseen by the Merseyside Police and Crime Commissioner (PCC). As of May 2021, the elected PCC is Emily Spurrell. The PCC is scrutinised by the Merseyside Police and Crime Panel, made up of elected councillors from the local authorities in Merseyside. Before November 2012 when PCCs were introduced, the Merseyside Police Authority was responsible for overseeing Merseyside Police.

== Organisation ==
Until 2017, Merseyside Police was divided into five Basic Command Units (BCUs), one for each of the Local Authority areas that make up Merseyside. The BCUs were:

- Liverpool (following a merger of Liverpool North and Liverpool South in April 2015)
- Sefton
- Wirral
- St Helens
- Knowsley

In 2017, following a force restructure the Basic Command Unit structure was disbanded in favour of a functional structure.

In 2026, following extensive planning by a dedicated team, Merseyside Police transitioned to a new geographical BCU model. This structure is based on locally focused command teams and is intended to enhance the responsiveness of policing within communities.

The four BCUs are:

- Liverpool
- Sefton
- Wirral
- Knowsley and St Helens.

== Departments ==
=== Matrix Disruption Team ===
The Matrix Disruption Team, led by a chief inspector, consists of syndicates made up of inspectors, sergeants and constables. Each syndicate works with other Matrix units to provide the force with a level two response to gun crime, faction-based criminality and cash-in-transit robberies.

=== Mounted Section ===
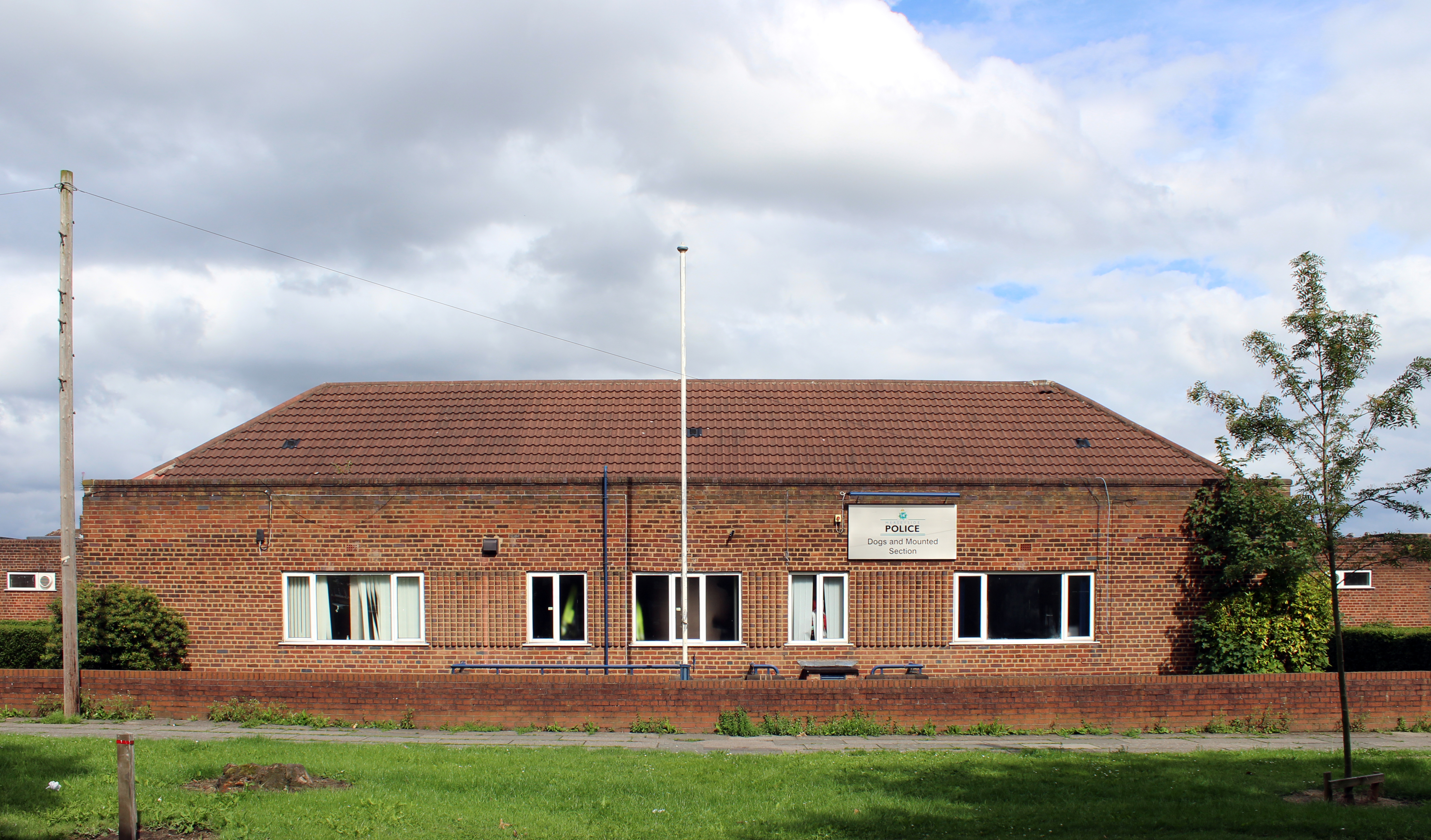
Dog and Mounted Section building on Greenhill Road, Allerton

Merseyside Police Mounted Section is the oldest Provincial Mounted section, formed in 1886 as part of Liverpool City Police. It is based at Greenhill Road, Allerton, Liverpool.

The mounted section is an operational specialist section with a staff of one inspector, two sergeants, 14 constables, six civilian stable hands and 14 horses.

The section provides neighbourhoods with an alternative response to reduce the incidents of crime and disorder.

=== Dog Section ===
Each area within the force has its own allocation of dogs and handlers who work alongside the neighbourhood patrol section.

There are currently 70 general-purpose dogs in the force area, 16 of these have extended training for deployment alongside colleagues from the firearms department.

Merseyside Police, like most forces, rely on the German Shepherd Dog and Belgian malinois as their general purpose police dogs.

The force also utilises both English Springer Spaniels and Labradors for their specialist detection roles; drugs, firearms, explosives and cadaver.

=== Air Support Group (closed) ===
Air support to policing in England and Wales is provided by the National Police Air Service (NPAS).

Prior to this, the Merseyside Police Air Support Group was set up in late 1989 in response to an increase in the number of high-speed vehicle pursuits that were occurring after burglaries had been committed outside of the force area. The unit was disbanded in July 2011 amid budget cuts with the loss of its helicopter and Woodvale base.

Prior to the establishment of NPAS, Merseyside shared Air Support with Cheshire, Greater Manchester, North Wales and Lancashire as the North West Regional Air Support Group.

=== Anti-Social Behaviour Taskforce (closed) ===
The former Anti-Social Behaviour Taskforce dealt with people who were alleged to be creating anti-social behaviour. They also made raids for drugs and known offenders who were alleged to be lowering the standard of life for the community.

The unit was initially known as Axis, but the use of this name was dropped around the end of 2007. It was publicly announced on 9 July 2010 that as a result of budget reductions, this department would be closed and they disbanded in early 2011.

== Equipment ==
=== Vehicles ===
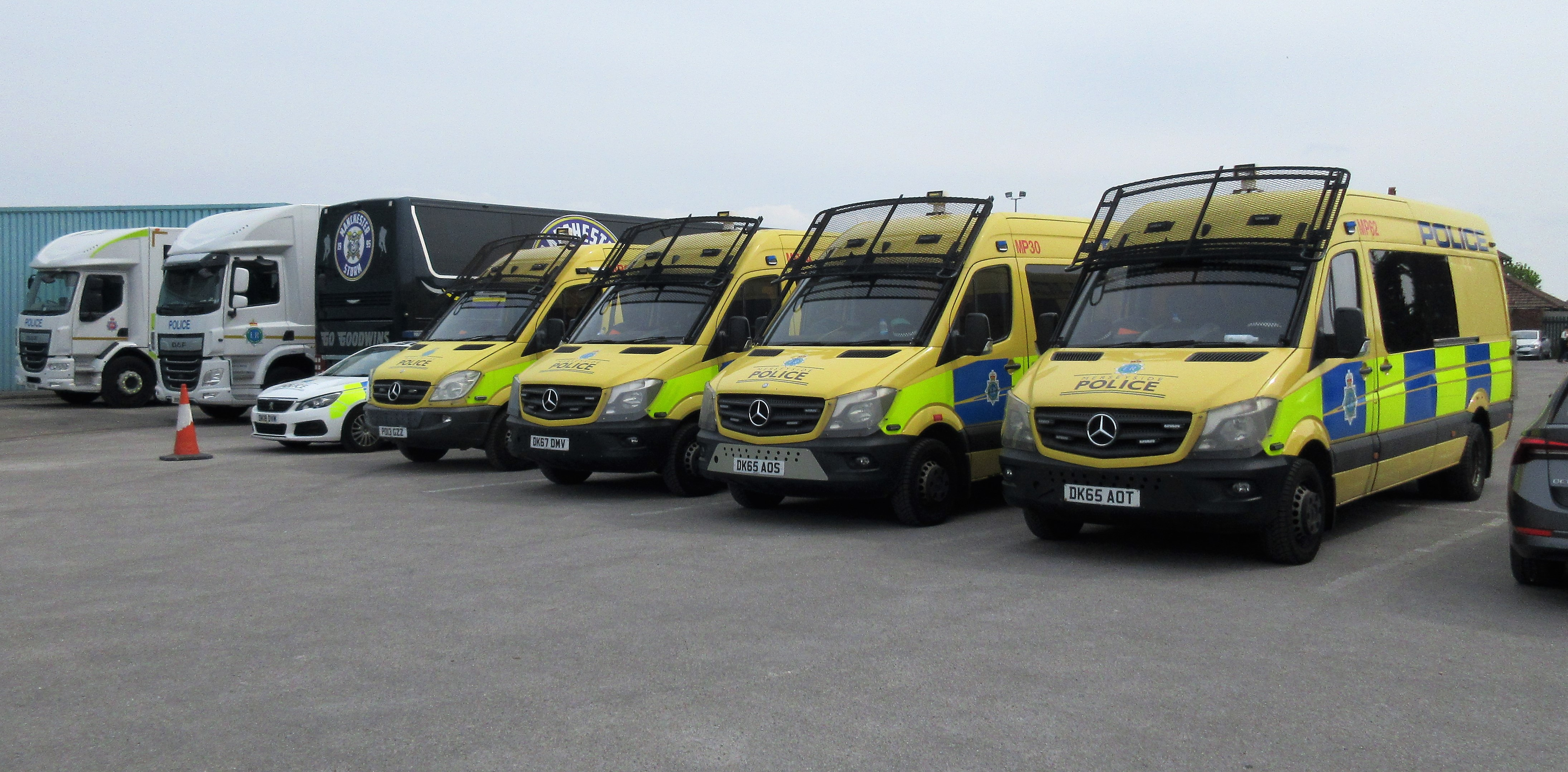
Mercedes-Benz Sprinters

Merseyside Police has a wide fleet of vehicles. In late 2012, Merseyside Police took delivery of three OVIK Pangolin armoured public order vehicles, as used by the Police Service of Northern Ireland. These vehicles were intended for public order and counter-terrorist operations.

== Collaborations ==
Merseyside Police is a partner in the North West Police Underwater Search & Marine Unit. It was also a partner in the North West Motorway Police Group until it was disbanded in April 2025.

== See also ==
- Category:Merseyside Police officers
- Law enforcement in the United Kingdom
- List of law enforcement agencies in the United Kingdom
- Mersey Tunnels Police
- Port of Liverpool Police
