= Sue Biggs =

Director General of the Royal Horticultural Society

Sue Biggs CBE
- Born: Leicester
- Occupation: Director General of the Royal Horticultural Society

Sue-Anne Hilbre Biggs CBE was the Director General of the Royal Horticultural Society, retiring in June 2022 as the longest-serving Director General in the charity's history. Biggs began her career in the travel industry, where she worked for 30 years, and was awarded an Outstanding Achievement Award by the Travel Weekly Globe Travel Awards. She was made a CBE in the 2017 New Year Honours, for her services to the environment at ornamental horticulture industries.

== Early life and education ==
Biggs was born in Leicester and brought up in Sheffield. She grew up on Caxton Road, in the Broomhill area of the city. For her seventh birthday, her mother gave her a packet of seeds and a small trowel, encouraging her to plant them in their garden, and Biggs credits this as the source of her love of gardening.

She attended Abbeydale Grammar School. She obtained a BA in English and American Literature from the University of Nottingham and a Postgraduate Diploma in Tourism from the University of Manchester.

== Kuoni Travel and Thomas Cook ==
Biggs began working for Kuoni Travel in 1982 as a product executive; she was the first woman to be appointed to the board, as well as the first non-Swiss board member. For 12 years she was the managing director of the UK Division. Biggs' role included working with the charities supported by Kuoni which included Plan International and the Born Free Foundation. She left Kuoni after the organisation underwent a restructure, having worked there for 25 years.

Biggs joined Thomas Cook in 2008, where she worked as managing director of scheduled business. In 2008, Biggs was awarded the Outstanding Achievement Award at the Travel Weekly Globe Travel Awards. Biggs left Thomas Cook in August 2009.

== Director General of the RHS ==
Biggs had a longstanding love of horticulture, and had been a member of the RHS for 18 years at the time she applied for the position of director general. She was encouraged to apply for the role by her husband. She was appointed to the post in June 2010. Biggs splits her time between the RHS headquarters at Vincent Square and RHS Wisley.

Biggs has stated that her first aim upon taking up the role was to bring everybody together as a team, following a major restructuring of the organisation. She has overseen several major changes to the society in an effort to change its image and make it a more inclusive and forward-thinking organisation. She wanted to make the RHS, "attractive to everyone – from the novice gardener to expert horticulturists". Biggs later stated in an interview with Garden Design Journal that her proudest achievement was her work to make the Royal Horticultural Society a more "open and friendly society" and "bringing younger people and different communities into horticulture". Biggs oversaw an increase in membership of 90,000 between 2010 and 2015.

Biggs also restructured management, improved service to customers and announced plans for several new projects including redevelopment of the Lindley Library and a new scientific research centre. Over 28,000 schools signed up to her Get Growing campaign. In 2014, frustrated by ticket touts reselling tickets to the Chelsea Flower Show for large profits, Biggs announced the launch of last minute charity tickets for the event with the money going towards horticultural apprenticeships.

In January 2015, the former RHS operations manager Stuart Medhurst first appeared in court charged with stealing almost £700,000 from the charity over ten years. Biggs wrote to staff at the time, stating that the organisation had, over the past three years, been carrying out in-depth audits and that the society was now "in a much stronger and more robust position to ensure unacceptable activity could not take place within the society."

Biggs was awarded a CBE in the 2017 New Year Honours. The CBE was awarded in recognition for her services to the environment and ornamental horticulture industry. The award was presented by The Prince of Wales at Buckingham Palace in March 2017. Biggs stated after receiving the award, "I feel very fortunate to work in an organisation with such remarkable people promoting something I feel so passionate about, and this award belongs as much to them as me."

In 2017, Highways England proposed changes to the A3 road which would impact on woodlands that are part of RHS Wisley. Biggs was highly critical of the proposal, stating, "It would be criminal for this irreplaceable woodland to be lost when another viable plan would avoid cutting down these century-old trees and still meet the important need to widen the A3." Plans were later put by Highways England that would safeguard the mature trees. The preferred option chosen by Highways England, however, was still criticised by Biggs as the new roundabout would remove the current direct connections between the A3 and the gardens, potentially adding an extra 1.5 to 5.25 miles to the journey of visitors.

In 2018, Biggs was inspired when she heard of Syrian refugees who were setting up gardens in the Domiz Camp in northern Iraq. She was reminded of when the RHS had sent seeds to British prisoners of war in Germany during World War II, and the RHS sent 2000 packets of seeds to the camp in Kurdistan.

Biggs's retirement from the RHS was announced in October 2021.

== Personal life ==
Biggs lives in Cobham, Surrey, having moved there from Sunbury-on-Thames in 2013. She enjoys plants and gardening in her spare time, spending time in her own garden as well as public gardens such as those at Hampton Court and Bushy Park. She has designed gardens for friends. Biggs also had a garden in Umbria, Italy which contained approximately sixty olive trees.

In 2014, Biggs had breast cancer. She has spoken about how the beauty of the plants in her garden contributed to her recovery, stating, "I wanted to see my new garden grow, to see the wisteria flower again, to walk among plants and take in their scent."
