= Jon Murphy (police officer) =

British academic and former senior police officer

Chief Constable Sir Jon Murphy QPM DL
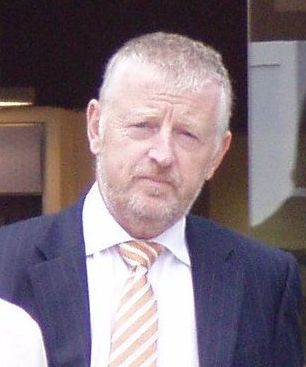

Chief Constable of Merseyside Police
- In office 2010–2016
- Preceded by: Bernard Hogan-Howe
- Succeeded by: Andy Cooke

Personal details
- Born: Jonathan Michael Murphy; 17 June 1958 (age 68) Liverpool, England
- Education: University of Liverpool; Fitzwilliam College, Cambridge

Sir Jonathan Michael Murphy, QPM, DL (born 17 June 1958) is a British academic and former senior police officer. Since 2016, he has been Professor of Advanced Policing Studies at Liverpool John Moores University. He was the Chief Constable of Merseyside Police from 2010 to 2016.

== Early life and education ==
Murphy was born on 17 June 1958 in Liverpool, England. He studied for a Bachelor of Laws (LLB Hons) degree at Liverpool University. In 2001, he earned a diploma in Applied Criminology from Cambridge University (Fitzwilliam College).

== Career ==
=== Police career ===
In January 1975, Murphy joined Merseyside Police. He rose to become as Deputy Chief Constable of Merseyside Police and a member of the Association of Chief Police Officers. He then served as Chief Constable of Merseyside Police from 2010 to 2016, before retiring form the police.

=== Academic career ===
Murphy held the Fulbright Police Fellowship at the University of California in 1995. In June 2016, he gave the 141st Roscoe Lecture at Liverpool John Moores University. In July 2016, he became Professor of Advanced Policing Studies at Liverpool John Moores University.

== Honours ==
Murphy has been commended on fourteen occasions and was awarded the Queen's Police Medal in the 2007 Birthday Honours. He was knighted in the 2014 Birthday Honours for services to policing.

Ribbon	Description	Notes
	Knight Bachelor	June 2014
	Queen's Police Medal (QPM)	16 June 2007; 2007 Queen's Birthday Honours List
	Queen Elizabeth II Golden Jubilee Medal	2002; UK version of this medal
	Queen Elizabeth II Diamond Jubilee Medal	2012; UK version of this medal
	Police Long Service and Good Conduct Medal	

- He was appointed as a Deputy Lieutenant for the County of Merseyside on 1 March 2017. This gave him the Post Nominal Letters "DL" for Life.

Police appointments
Preceded by Bernard Lawson (Acting)	Chief Constable of Merseyside Police; 2010 – 2016	Succeeded by Andy Cooke
