= Eric St Johnston =

British police inspector and colonel (1911–86)

Colonel Sir Eric St Johnston
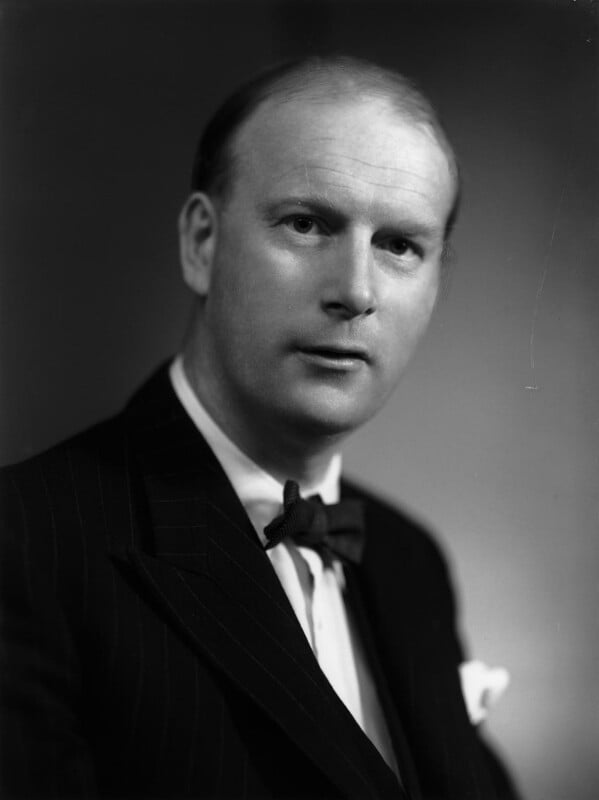
- St Johnston in 1950
- Born: 7 January 1911
- Died: 17 March 1986 (aged 75)
- Education: Bromsgrove School; Corpus Christi College, Cambridge
- Occupation: Police officer
- Spouse: Joan Wharton (m. 1937; div. 1969)

Sir Thomas Eric St Johnston, (7 January 1911 – 17 March 1986) was chief inspector of constabulary from 1967 until 1970.

== Early life ==
St Johnston was the son of Thomas Gerald St Johnston (1882–1968) and Ethel Mary Frances Flora St Johnston (née Riley, 1887–1960).

St Johnson was educated at Bromsgrove School and Corpus Christi College, Cambridge, where he was a friend of the writer Nigel Balchin.

== Career ==
St Johnston joined the civilian staff of Scotland Yard; and was admitted a barrister at the Middle Temple in 1934. In 1940 he became chief constable of Oxfordshire, in 1944 of the Durham Police and in 1950 of the Lancashire Force. A former colonel in the Royal Artillery TA, during World War II he was employed at the War Office. He was director of administration for Spencer Stuart & Associates from 1971 until 1975. In 1978 he published his autobiography One Policeman’s Story

== Honours ==

| Ribbon | Description | Notes |
| | Order of the British Empire (CBE) | Commander; Civil Division |
| | Order of St John (KStJ) | Knight of Justice |
| | Knight Bachelor | |
| | Queen's Police Medal (QPM) | |
| | 1939–1945 Star | |
| | France and Germany Star | |
| | Defence Medal | |
| | War Medal | |
| | Territorial Decoration (TD) | |
| | Police Long Service and Good Conduct Medal | |
| | Croix de Guerre | Awarded by France; World War II Version; With Palm |

Police appointments
| Preceded by Edward Dodd | HM Chief Inspector of Constabulary for England, Wales and Northern Ireland; 1967–1970 | Succeeded by John McKay |
| Preceded by Archibald Frederick Hordern | Chief Constable of Lancashire Constabulary; 1950–1967 | Succeeded by ? |
| Preceded by H Studdy | Chief Constable of Durham Constabulary; 1944-1950 | Succeeded by Alec A Muir |
| Preceded by Ernest Kennaway Arbuthnot | Chief Constable of Oxfordshire Constabulary; 1940-1944 | Succeeded by ? |
