= David O'Dowd =

Sir David O'Dowd CBE OStJ QPM

HM Chief Inspector of Constabulary for England, Wales and Northern Ireland
- In office 1996–2001

Personal details
- Born: David Joseph O'Dowd; 20 February 1942 (age 84)

Sir David Joseph O'Dowd (born 20 February 1942) was Chief Inspector of Constabulary from 1996 until 2001.

O'Dowd was educated at Gartree High School, University of Leicester, the Open University and the University of Aston. He joined the Leicester City Police in 1961 rising to the rank of Chief Inspector. In 1977 he joined the West Midlands Police as a Superintendent. In 1984, along with John Smith and Wyn Jones, he was one of a trio of young provincial rising stars who were appointed to the rank of deputy assistant commissioner in the Metropolitan Police as part of Commissioner Sir Kenneth Newman's drive for modernisation, becoming head of strategic planning. He was Chief Constable of the Northamptonshire Police from 1986 until 1993. He was High Sheriff of Northamptonshire in 2007.

Police appointments
Preceded by Trefor Morris	HM Chief Inspector of Constabulary for England, Wales and Northern Ireland; 1996 –2001	Succeeded by Keith Povey
