= Lawrence Byford =

English police officer (1925–2018)

Sir Lawrence Byford CBE QPM DL
- Born: 10 August 1925; Normanton, Yorkshire, England
- Died: 10 February 2018 (aged 92)
- Occupation: Police officer
- Office: Chief Inspector of Constabulary
- Term: 1983–1987
- Predecessor: James Crane
- Successor: Richard Barratt

Sir Lawrence Byford CBE QPM DL (10 August 1925 – 10 February 2018) was an English police officer who served as Chief Inspector of Constabulary from 1983 to 1987. His inquiry into the failings of the Yorkshire Ripper investigation by West Yorkshire Police earned him the description "the man who changed the face of modern policing" because it "led to fundamental changes in the way serial killer investigations would be carried out in future across the world".

== Early life ==
Byford was born the son of a coal miner in Normanton, West Riding of Yorkshire. He left school without any qualifications and became an apprentice electrician at a local pit. In 1944, Byford was conscripted and saw service during the latter months of World War II with the Royal Signals in France, Belgium and Germany.

== Career ==
Byford's police career began in 1947 as a constable with the West Riding Constabulary, where he rose to be the Commander of the Huddersfield Division. He also graduated from the University of Leeds with a law degree in 1956. He left in 1968 to join the senior leadership team of Lincolnshire Police, and was Chief Constable from 1973 to 1977. He was a Regional Inspector of Constabulary from 1978 until his appointment to the top job. In retirement he served as President of Yorkshire County Cricket Club from 1991 to 1999.

== Honours ==
He was awarded the Queen's Police Medal (QPM) in the 1974 New Years Honours List. He was appointed a Commander of the Order of the British Empire in 1979, and was knighted in 1984. He was appointed as the Deputy Lieutenant (DL) of the County of Lincolnshire on 24 November 1987. The University of Leeds awarded him an honorary degree (LLD) in 1987. He was appointed as the Deputy Lieutenant (DL) of the County of North Yorkshire on 31 March 1998. On 10 August 2000 he was moved to the retired list in both counties upon reaching the mandatory retirement age of 75.

| Ribbon | Description | Notes |
| | Knight Bachelor (Kt) | 1984 New Year Honours List |
| | Order of the British Empire (CBE) | 1979 New Years Honours List; 29 December 1978; Commander; Civil Division |
| | Order of St John | |
| | Queen's Police Medal (QPM) | 1 January 1974; "For Distinguished Service" |
| | 1939-45 Star | |
| | France and Germany Star | |
| | War Medal | |
| | Police Long Service and Good Conduct Medal | |

== Personal life ==
In 1950 he married Muriel Campbell Massey: they had three children, one of whom, Mark Byford, was Deputy Director General of the BBC and head of BBC Journalism from 2004 to 2011. Lawrence Byford's daughter, Jill, is mother of comedian Maisie Adam. Lady Byford died in 2025.

== Later life ==
Byford was President of Yorkshire County Cricket Club from 1990 to 1999; and a Deputy Lieutenant of North Yorkshire from 1992.

Police appointments
| Preceded by James Crane | HM Chief Inspector of Constabulary for England, Wales and Northern Ireland; 1983–1987 | Succeeded by Richard Barrett |
