= Archibald Lush =

Welsh educator and civil servant

Sir Archibald James Lush (15 September 1900 – 14 April 1976) was a Welsh educator and civil servant.

He was educated at Tredegar Grammar School in his hometown and at Jesus College, Oxford. On leaving Oxford, he worked for the Carnegie Trust. He was County Youth Organiser for Monmouthshire from 1940, before serving as Chief Inspector of Schools for the county of Monmouthshire from 1944 to 1964. He was then Chairman of the Welsh Hospital Board and was knighted in the Investiture honours in 1969 for social services to Wales. He was a close friend of Aneurin Bevan and acted as his political agent for most of his parliamentary life.
