= Lancashire Constabulary =

English territorial police force

Agency overview
- Formed: 1839; 187 years ago

Jurisdictional structure
- Operations jurisdiction: Lancashire, UK
- Map of Lancashire Constabulary's jurisdiction
- Area: 2,903 square kilometres (1,121 mi^{2})
- Population: 1,500,000
- Constituting instrument: Police Act 1996
- General nature: Local civilian police

Operational structure
- Overseen by: His Majesty's Inspectorate of Constabulary and Fire & Rescue Services; Independent Office for Police Conduct
- Headquarters: Hutton, near Preston
- Police Officers: 3,088 (2020); 190 special constables (2020)
- Police Community Support Officer (PCSO)s: 280 (2020)
- Police and Crime Commissioner responsible: Clive Grunshaw
- Agency executive: Sacha Hatchett, Chief Constable
- Divisions: 3

Facilities
- Stations: 36

Website
- www.lancashire.police.uk

Lancashire Constabulary is the territorial police force responsible for policing the ceremonial county of Lancashire in North West England. The force's headquarters are at Hutton, near the city of Preston. As of September 2020, the force has 3,088 police officers, 190 special constables, and 280 police community support officers (PCSO), 300 police support volunteers (PSV), and 2,287 staff.

== History ==
After many complaints over a number of years over the crime ridden state of Lancashire, it was decided in 1839 that a combined county police force was required to police the county. The force was founded on 18 December 1839, with an original strength of 502 men. Captain John Woodford was appointed Chief Constable.

Over the next 50 years, the police force saw many changes including the introduction of the police helmet and, during the 1860s, the force lost its first officer, PC Jump, who died after being shot by a group of men that he and a colleague were searching. By the end of the century the force had developed a detective department who were allowed to wear plain clothes. The first detective appointed was John Wallbank.

In 1917, the force first allowed female officers although it was only in the 1950s that they were allowed uniforms, and not until the 1970s were they paid at the same rate as their male counterparts. In 1948 the force's dog section was established with many differing breeds being used, but by the 1950s it was established that the German shepherd was the most suitable.

In 1965, the force had an establishment of 3,784 officers and an actual strength of 3,454, making it the second largest police force (after the Metropolitan Police) and the largest county force in Great Britain.

The force then went through major changes in the 1970s, when the force was reduced to cover the new re-bordered Lancashire with the other areas coming under the jurisdiction of Cumbria Constabulary, Greater Manchester Police and Merseyside Police.

On 10 October 2007, the Home Office announced that Lancashire Constabulary had ranked joint first, with Surrey, out of 43 forces by Her Majesty's Inspectorate of Constabularies. All 43 police forces were assessed on seven areas - tackling crime, serious crime, protecting vulnerable people, satisfaction, neighbourhood policing, local priorities and resources and efficiency.

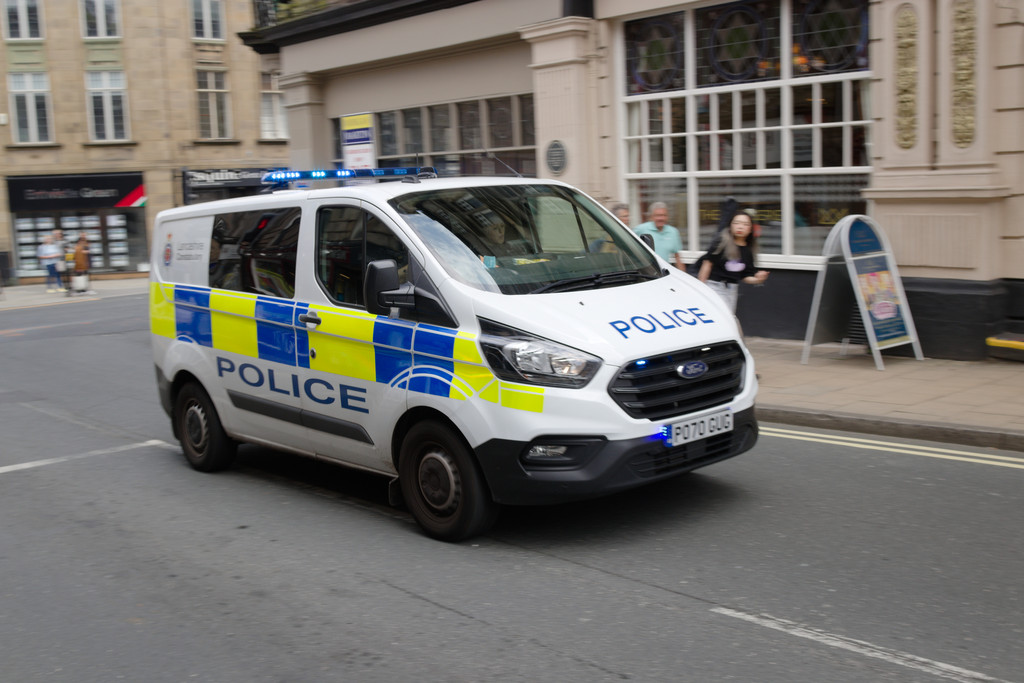
Lancashire Constabulary Ford Transit responding to an emergency call

=== Proposed merger ===
Under proposals made by the home secretary on 6 February 2006, it was to be merged with Cumbria Constabulary. These were accepted by both forces on 26 February, and the merger would have taken place on 1 April 2007. However, in July 2006, both Cumbria and Lancashire constabularies decided not to proceed with the merger because the government failed to remedy issues with the council tax precept which left both forces unable to proceed.

=== Chief constables ===
- 1839–1856: John Woodford
- 1856–1859: Thomas Walker Sheppard
- 1859–1868: William P. Elgee
- 1868–1876: Colonel Robert Bruce
- 1877–1880: Charles Legge
- 1880–1909: Henry Martin Moorsom
- 1909–1912: Charles Villiers Ibbetson
- 1912–1927: Sir Philip Lane
- 1927–1935: Wilfred Trubshaw
- 1935–1950: Archibald Frederick Hordern
- 1950–1967: Sir Eric St Johnston (Chief Inspector of Constabulary, 1967–1970)
- 1967–1972: William Palfrey
- 1972–1977: Stanley Parr (dismissed for disreputable conduct)
- 1978–1983: Albert Laugharne
- 1983–1995: Robert Brian Johnson
- 1995–2002: Pauline Clare
- 2002–2005: Paul Stephenson
- 2005–2017: Stephen Finnigan
- 2017–2021: Andy Rhodes
- 2021–2024: Chris Rowley
- 2024–present: Sacha Hatchett

=== Officers killed in the line of duty ===
The Police Roll of Honour Trust and Police Memorial Trust list and commemorate all British police officers killed in the line of duty. Since its establishment in 1984, the Police Memorial Trust has erected 50 memorials nationally to some of those officers.

The following officers of Lancashire Constabulary are listed by the trust as having died attempting to prevent, stop or solve a crime:

- PC Peter Burnett, 1990 (collapsed and died attempting to disperse rioters)
- PC Ian Wain Woodward, 1987 (shot dead)
- Acting Sergeant Walter Lacey, 1978 (collapsed and died attempting to arrest a suspect)
- Superintendent Gerry Richardson, 1971 (shot dead attempting to arrest a gunman who had shot a fellow officer; posthumously awarded the George Cross)
- PC Ernest Southern, 1962 (collapsed and died attending a street affray)
- Detective Inspector James O'Donnell, 1958 (shot dead attempting to arrest a gunman who had shot two others; posthumously awarded the Queen's Police Medal)
- PC Sydney Arthur Tysoe, 1949 (died from injuries sustained during an arrest in 1940)
- War Reserve Constable John Towers, 1943 (died from injuries sustained in an assault)
- PC Stewart Mungo Whillis, 1907 (died from injuries sustained in an assault in 1901)
- PC Nicholas Cock, 1876 (fatally shot arresting armed burglars)
- PC William Jump, 1862 (shot dead attempting to arrest an armed gang)

=== Lancashire Police Museum ===
Located in Lancaster Castle, in the former site of HMP Lancaster, Lancashire Police Museum is free to enter with sixteen galleries, each in former prison cells. Exhibits include police uniforms, radios, handcuffs, saddles and other evocative objects.

== Divisions and collaborations ==
The force is split into three geographical divisions, and a number of specialist units are based within force HQ at Hutton. The split is approximate, and divisions are deliberately vague, giving a seamless approach to policing in the Lancashire area. The geographical divisions and their headquarters are as follows:

- West – The divisional headquarters is located in Blackpool, it was opened in 2018 after £24 million was invested in the new building. Fylde officers are based in Kirkham with support from Blackpool. The northern parts of the division are Lancaster, Morecambe, Heysham and the Wyre area. Officers covering the Wyre are based in Fleetwood.
- South –The divisional headquarters are in Preston, with a secondary base at Chorley next to the Magistrates' Court. South division polices the Preston, South Ribble, Chorley and West Lancashire areas. The ageing station at Chorley is due to be replaced, after the acquisition of a former Runshaw College site.
- East – Based at Greenbank, Blackburn, this division is primarily assigned to police the Blackburn with Darwen, Ribble Valley and Accrington, Burnley, Pendle and Rossendale areas.

=== Hutton headquarters ===
Calls and digital engagement are handled by Contact Management based at the Hutton headquarters. A number of other operationally significant departments are also based there, including Force Intelligence Bureau, Vehicle Maintenance, and Scientific Support.

The Hutton site also houses the Training School, where new recruits undergo their initial classroom training, and serving officers and staff attend development courses and annual refreshment courses, such as First Aid and Officer Safety. The proverb "Softly, softly, catchee monkey", has been used as the motto of the Training School, as advice for novice police officers on how to apprehend criminals. It inspired the title of the BBC television police series, Softly, Softly, from 1966 onwards.

=== Specialist Operations ===
At the end of 2017 Lancashire Constabulary formed the Tactical Operations Team (TacOps for short) which is composed of the Roads Policing Unit, Dog Unit, Mounted Branch and Armed Response Unit.

TacOps was renamed in 2023 to Specialist Operations Team, or Specialist Ops.

Lancashire Constabulary partners with the North West Police Underwater Search & Marine Unit.

=== Counter terrorism ===
Following a review in 2015, British police forces changed their approach to counter terrorism, and eleven regional counter terrorism units were formed.

Lancashire is covered by the Counter Terrorism Policing North West's unit, which also covers Cheshire, Cumbria, Greater Manchester, the Isle of Man and Merseyside.

=== Motorway unit ===
The force's motorway policing unit has headquarters at Samlesbury near Preston. The unit is led by a single inspector who in turn is responsible for seven sergeants and 43 police constables. The unit also operates a vehicle checking station at Cuerden between Chorley and Preston on the M65, this is done in co-operation with VOSA.

Until 2018, Lancashire's motorway unit was one of the four forces that make up the North West Motorway Police Group along with Merseyside Police, Greater Manchester Police and Cheshire Constabulary.

=== Air Support Unit ===
Since 2013, air support has been provided by the National Police Air Service, which provides air support to all police forces in England & Wales.

This now-defunct unit operated an EC135 helicopter based at BAE Warton. The force had an ASU since 1994 when it fielded a Eurocopter Squirrel, but this was retired in the early 2000s as it was replaced by the newer EC135.

=== Firearms unit ===
Due to police officers in the county not being routinely armed the force has its own specialised firearms unit based at locations around the county. The force has at any one time nine armed officers on patrol. As well being trained in firearms, AFOs are also trained in other skills such as method of entry and advanced pursuit tactics.

== Police stations ==
Although the constabulary's headquarters is in Hutton, there is not normally public access to this site.

Each of the three geographic divisions has a divisional headquarters, West – Blackpool, South – Preston, and East – Greenbank Blackburn.

Across the county, seventeen police stations / satellite offices have retained front counter services, for the public to walk up and speak to someone face to face.

Four stations have operational custody suites, namely Blackpool, Lancaster, Blackburn and Preston, with a total capacity of 138 cells and a further two stations, Burnley and Skelmersdale, have custody suites not currently in use.

== Equipment ==
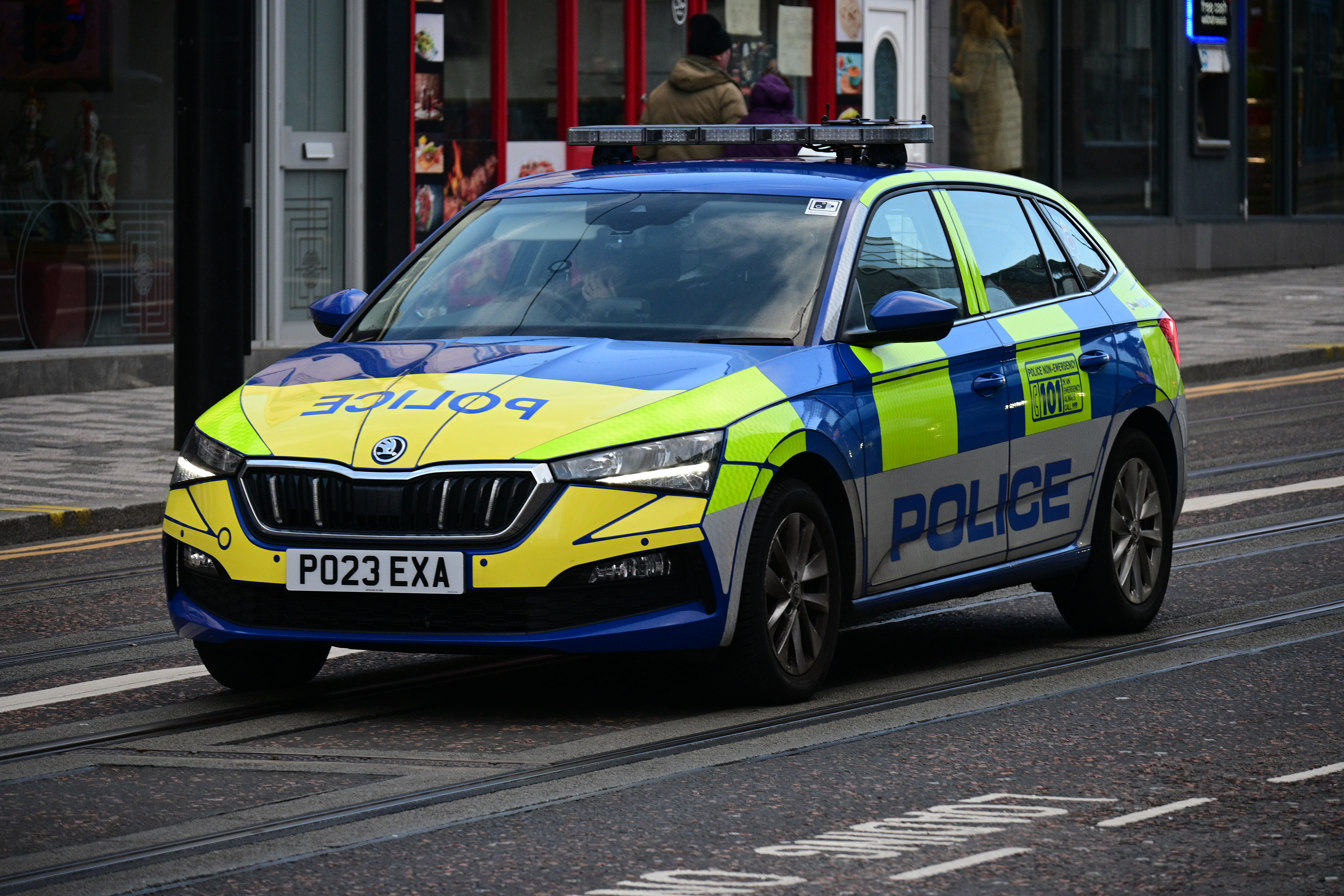
Škoda Scala general purpose car in Blackpool in November 2024

After successful trials in 2014, the force issued body-mounted cameras to all officers in forward-facing roles. All officers are now trained to use them and many choose to use them on every shift, although their use is not mandatory. In 2020, Lancashire Police upgraded to cameras with the ability to integrate with the digital policing app Pronto, which has replaced traditional paper pocket note books.

The constabulary's armed response teams with authorised firearms officers carrying assault rifles, pistols and taser guns. Armed Response Vehicles also carry specialist equipment to gain entry to buildings and vehicles.

=== Vehicles ===
In 2023, the constabulary took delivery of 120 Škoda vehicles, including 92 Scala general purpose cars, 21 Superb SportLine hatchbacks for use by the force Roads Policing Unit, five Karoqs for rural patrols and four Kamiqs for driver training duties.

== PEEL inspection ==
His Majesty's Inspectorate of Constabulary and Fire & Rescue Services (HMICFRS) conducts a periodic police effectiveness, efficiency and legitimacy (PEEL) inspection of each police service's performance. In its latest PEEL inspection, Lancashire Constabulary was rated as follows:

| | Outstanding | Good | Adequate | Requires Improvement | Inadequate |
|---|---|---|---|---|---|
| 2021/22 rating | | Preventing crime; Protecting vulnerable people; Managing offenders; Developing a positive workplace; Good use of resources; Treatment of the public | Responding to the public | Investigating crime | |

== See also ==
- Law enforcement in the United Kingdom
- List of law enforcement agencies in the United Kingdom, Crown Dependencies and British Overseas Territories
- Operation Tremor
