= Deputy commander (Metropolitan Police) =

Deputy commander was a rank in the London Metropolitan Police which existed between 1946 and 1968.

In 1946, the rank of chief constable, which was between superintendent and deputy assistant commissioner, was renamed deputy commander. At the same time, the rank of deputy assistant commissioner was divided into commander and deputy assistant commissioner. From 1949, deputy commander was superior to the new rank of chief superintendent. It was abolished in 1968.

The rank badge consisted of crossed tipstaves in a wreath.
