= His Majesty's Inspectorate of Constabulary and Fire & Rescue Services =

Statutory public body in England and Wales

- Established: 21 July 1856
- Headquarters: Birmingham, England
- Region served: England and Wales; Northern Ireland (on request); Crown Dependencies; British Overseas Territories
- Chief Inspector: Sir Andy Marsh
- Staff: 274 (2023/24)
- Website: hmicfrs.justiceinspectorates.gov.uk

- Applies to: England and Wales; Crown Dependencies; British Overseas Territories; Northern Ireland (on request)
- Relates to: Police force and fire & rescue service inspection

Other UK counterparts
- Northern Ireland: Criminal Justice Inspection Northern Ireland
- Scotland: His Majesty's Inspectorate of Constabulary in Scotland; His Majesty's Fire Service Inspectorate for Scotland

His Majesty's Inspectorate of Constabulary and Fire & Rescue Services (HMICFRS), formerly Her Majesty's Inspectorate of Constabulary (HMIC), has statutory responsibility for the inspection of the police forces of England and Wales, and since July 2017 the fire and rescue services of England. HMICFRS is headed by the Chief Inspector of Constabulary and Chief Inspector of Fire & Rescue Services. It has taken over the responsibilities of His Majesty's Fire Service Inspectorate.

The Inspectorate is one of 5 inspectorates of the criminal justice system of England and Wales. The others are His Majesty's Crown Prosecution Service Inspectorate, His Majesty's Inspectorate of Prisons, His Majesty's Inspectorate of Probation, and the Criminal Justice Joint Inspectorate.

Inspections may also be made, by invitation only, and on a non-statutory basis, of the Police Service of Northern Ireland and other organisations with policing responsibility.

== England and Wales ==
In England and Wales, HMICFRS is responsible to the UK Parliament. The first inspectors were appointed under the County and Borough Police Act 1856; current statutory functions are contained in the Police Act 1996 and related legislation. However, the body's principal statutory functions are unchanged since its establishment in 1856, namely to assess and report on the efficiency and effectiveness of police forces in England and Wales. In July 2017, its remit was expanded to include responsibility to assess and report on the efficiency, effectiveness and leadership of the 45 Fire & Rescue services in England.

The inspectorate is also paid by other departments to report on the activities of non-Home Office bodies involved in law enforcement, such as the British Transport Police, the Civil Nuclear Constabulary, HM Revenue and Customs, the National Crime Agency, the Police Service of Northern Ireland and some overseas police forces. Reporting has also been performed on a voluntary basis for the Special Investigation Branch (SIB) of the Royal Military Police. It also receives funding from the Treasury for its work on HMRC.

As a public authority, decisions and actions of HMICFRS are susceptible to judicial review.

=== Personnel ===
Sir Andy Marsh took office as HM Chief Inspector of Constabulary and HM Chief Inspector of Fire & Rescue Services on 1 October 2026. He was preceded on an interim basis by Michelle Skeer, who served from April to September 2026 following the departure of Andy Cooke. Cooke, former chief constable of Merseyside Police, held office from April 2022 to March 2026. Before Cooke, the chief inspector was former rail regulator Tom Winsor, who served from 2012 to 2022.

In addition to the Chief Inspector of Constabulary, there are three Inspectors of Constabulary and Fire & Rescue Services: Lee Freeman, former chief constable of Humberside Police; Kathryn Stone, former chair of the Bar Standards Board and before that Parliamentary Commissioner for Standards; Roy Wilsher, former chief fire officer in Hertfordshire. Appointments follow the Code of Practice of the Office of the Commissioner for Public Appointments.

== Northern Ireland ==
Inspections of the Police Service of Northern Ireland (PSNI) have been made in recent years by invitation, on a non-statutory basis. The Police (Northern Ireland) Act 1998 allows HMIC to perform inspection and assessment of services or projects by direction of the Secretary of State for Northern Ireland. At the request of the chief constable of the PSNI, in 2013 the inspectorate published a report into Northern Ireland's Historical Enquiries Team.

== List of chief inspectors ==
Inspectors of Constabulary for England and Wales from 1856:

- Captain Francis J. Parry, to 1900
- Captain Herbert D. Terry, from 1900

The first chief inspector was appointed in 1962.

1. Sir William Johnson, 1962–1963
2. Sir Edward Dodd, 1963–1966
3. Colonel Sir Eric St Johnston, 1967–1970
4. Sir John McKay, 1970–1972
5. Sir John Hill, 1972–1975
6. Sir James Haughton, 1976–1977
7. Sir Colin Woods, 1977–1979
8. Sir James Crane, 1979–1982
9. Sir Lawrence Byford, 1983–1987
10. Sir Richard Barrett, 1987–1990
11. Sir John Woodcock, 1990–1993
12. Sir Trefor Morris, 1993–1996
13. Sir David O'Dowd, 1996–2001
14. Sir Keith Povey 2002–2005
15. Sir Ronnie Flanagan, 2005–2009
16. Sir Denis O'Connor, 2009–2012
17. Sir Thomas Winsor, 2012–2022
18. Sir Andy Cooke, 2022–March 2026
19. Michelle Skeer (acting), April 2026–September 2026
20. Sir Andy Marsh, October 2026–present

In July 2017, the role became Chief Inspector of Constabulary and Chief Inspector of Fire & Rescue Services. The incumbent is Sir Andy Marsh, who took office on 1 October 2026.

== 2021 protest report ==
In March 2021, HMICFRS published a report that endorsed a proposed clampdown on protests. In response to the report, a whistleblower alleged that its authors had reached conclusions favouring the government's view prior to gathering and assessing evidence, in breach of the civil service code.

== See also ==
- His Majesty's Inspectorate of Constabulary in Scotland
- His Majesty's Fire Service Inspectorate for Scotland
- Criminal Justice Inspection Northern Ireland
