= Chief superintendent =

Senior police force rank

Chief superintendent is a senior rank in police forces, especially in those organised on the British model.

== Rank insignia of chief superintendent ==
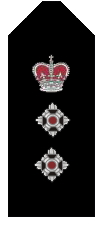
South Australia Police

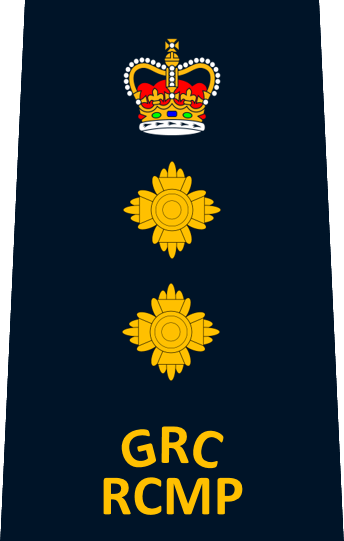
Royal Canadian Mounted Police

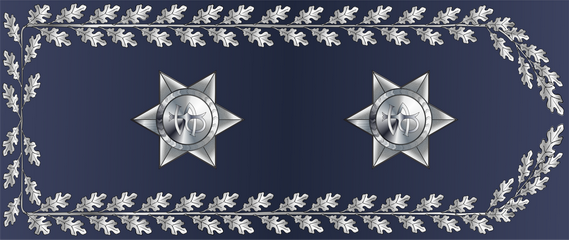
Portuguese Public Security Police

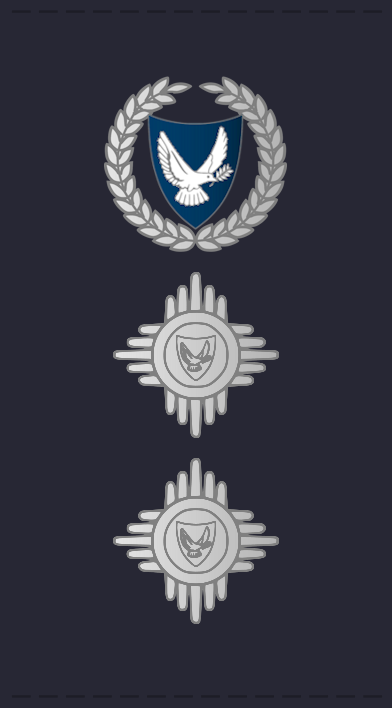
Cyprus Police

Garda Síochána

== Chief superintendent by country ==
=== Australia ===
In Australia, a chief superintendent is senior to the rank of superintendent in all the Australian police forces excepting the Western Australia Police. It is junior to the rank of commander (Victoria Police, South Australia Police) and the rank of assistant commissioner (New South Wales Police, Queensland Police). Officers wear the insignia of a crown over two Bath stars (or in the case of the New South Wales Police, a crown over two stars) the same as a colonel in the army.

=== Canada ===
In the Royal Canadian Mounted Police and the Ontario Provincial Police, a chief superintendent wears two Bath stars (or pips) below a crown, equivalent to a colonel. In the RCMP, the rank falls between superintendent and assistant commissioner. The OPP rank is between superintendent and deputy commissioner or provincial commander.

=== Hong Kong ===
In the Hong Kong Police Force, a chief superintendent of police (CSP) ranks between a senior superintendent (SSP) and an assistant commissioner of police (ACP). A CSP is usually a district commander (DC) or a branch or bureau commander (e.g. Narcotics Bureau). The commandant of the police tactical unit is also a CSP.

=== Ireland ===
In the Garda Síochána, the Republic of Ireland's national police force, the rank of chief superintendent is between superintendent and assistant commissioner. Chief superintendents usually command divisions, while detective chief superintendents head the various investigative branches. The rank marking is two red and gold pips over a red and gold bar.

=== Japan ===
The Japanese Prefectural police forces formerly used this rank. It has now been replaced by the rank of commissioner. A chief superintendent was chief of a prefectural police force and equivalent in rank to a Japanese army major general.

=== Papua New Guinea ===
In the Royal Papua New Guinea Constabulary, a chief superintendent is normally a metropolitan superintendent or the director of a police division. The rank is between superintendent and assistant commissioner.

=== Philippines ===
In the Philippines, chief superintendent is a rank in the Bureau of Jail Management and Penology and the Bureau of Fire Protection. It is above senior superintendent and below bureau director and is regarded as the equivalent of brigadier general in the Philippine Army. It was formerly used by the Philippine National Police.

Chief Superintendent in the Philippines

=== Portugal ===
Chief superintendent (Portuguese: superintendente-chefe) is the highest officer rank in the Public Security Police (PSP) of Portugal. It is senior to the police rank of superintendent, being roughly equivalent to a general officer in the armed forces.

Chiefs superintendents can exercise the roles of national director, deputy national directors, inspector general of the PSP and commanding officers of major police commands.

The basic rank insignia of a chief superintendent consists of dark blue epaulets bordered with silver leaves of oak and with two PSP stars (six points silver stars with the SP monogram in the center) in the middle. If exercising the role of national director or deputy national director / inspector general, the chief superintendents use instead, respectively, four and three PSP stars.

=== United Kingdom ===
UK police chief superintendent epaulette

In the British police, a chief superintendent (Ch Supt; or colloquially "chief super") is senior to a superintendent and junior to an assistant chief constable (or a commander in the Metropolitan Police or City of London Police).

The rank of chief superintendent was first introduced into the Metropolitan Police in 1949, when superintendents were regraded to the new rank, and has since been adopted in all British police forces. However, the rank had been used previously to this in some forces in certain circumstances. For example, in 1920 the deputy head of Shropshire Constabulary bore the official title of "chief superintendent and deputy chief constable" and in 1927, Lancashire Constabulary had two chief superintendents who were junior to the assistant chief constable.

Between 1949 and 1968, chief superintendent was junior to deputy commander in the Metropolitan Police, and between 1953 and 1974 it was immediately senior to superintendent grade I.

Traditionally, chief superintendents have commanded divisions, but since widespread reorganisation in the 1990s many forces have abandoned divisions for different forms of organisation and the areas commanded by chief superintendents vary widely from force to force. In most forces, however, they still command the largest territorial subdivisions, often known generally as basic command units (BCUs). The rank of chief superintendent was abolished on 1 April 1995 following recommendations made in the Sheehy Report, later confirmed by the Police Act 1996, although officers already holding the rank could continue to hold it. The Home Office officially reintroduced the rank of chief superintendent on 1 January 2002, under the terms of the Criminal Justice and Police Act 2001.

The senior detective and commander of the criminal investigation department in most forces is a detective chief superintendent (DCS or Det Ch Supt); in the Metropolitan Police, however, a DCS might command only a branch of the CID, and the head of the CID in each district was formerly also a DCS. Chief superintendents might also command other headquarters departments.

The rank badge, worn on the epaulettes, is a bath star ("pip") below a crown, the same rank badge worn by a lieutenant-colonel in the British Army. Metropolitan Police chief superintendents wore a crown over two stars until the abolition of the rank of superintendent grade I in 1974, after which they changed to the latter's rank badge, which was already worn by chief superintendents elsewhere in the country.
