= Commander =

Naval and air force officer rank

- Common types of insignia
- Service branch: Navies
- Rank group: Senior officer
- NATO rank code: OF-4
- Next higher rank: Captain (naval)
- Next lower rank: Lieutenant commander
- Equivalent ranks: Frigate captain (Francophone)

Commander (commonly abbreviated as Cdr.) is a common naval officer rank as well as a job title in many armies. Commander is also used as a level 8 rank or title in other formal organizations, including several police forces. In several countries, this naval rank is termed as a frigate captain.

Commander is also a generic term for an officer commanding any armed forces unit, such as "platoon commander", "brigade commander" and "squadron commander". In the police, terms such as "borough commander" and "incident commander" are used.

== Commander as a naval and air force rank ==
Commander is a rank used primarily in navies, and is very rarely used as a rank in armies. In most armies, the term "commander" is used as a job title. For example, in the US Army, an officer with the rank of captain (NATO rank code OF-2) may hold the title of "company commander", whereas an officer with the rank of lieutenant colonel (NATO rank code OF-4) typically holds the title of "battalion commander".

The title, originally "master and commander", originated in the 18th century to describe naval officers who commanded ships of war too large to be commanded by a lieutenant but too small to warrant the assignment of a post-captain and (before about 1770) a sailing master; the commanding officer served as his own master. In practice, these were usually unrated sloops-of-war of no more than 20 guns. The Royal Navy shortened "master and commander" to "commander" in 1794; however, the term "master and commander" remained (unofficially) in common parlance for several years. The equivalent American rank master commandant remained in use until changed to commander in 1838.

A corresponding rank in some navies is frigate captain. In the 20th and 21st centuries, the rank has been assigned the NATO rank code of OF-4.

Various functions of commanding officers were also styled commander. In the navy of the Dutch Republic, anyone who commanded a ship or a fleet without having an appropriate rank to do so could be called a Commandeur. This included ad hoc fleet commanders and acting captains (Luitenant-Commandeur). In the fleet of the Admiralty of Zeeland however, commandeur was a formal rank, the equivalent of Schout-bij-nacht (rear-admiral) in the other Dutch admiralties. The Dutch use of the title as a rank lives on in the Royal Netherlands Navy, as the equivalent of commodore. In the Royal Netherlands Air Force, however, this rank is known by the English spelling of commodore which is the Dutch equivalent of the British air commodore.

=== Australia ===
The rank of commander in the Royal Australian Navy (RAN) is identical in description to that of a commander in the British Royal Navy. RAN chaplains who are in divisions 1, 2 or 3 (of five divisions) have the equivalent rank standing of commanders. This means that to officers and NCOs below the rank of commander, lieutenant colonel, or wing commander, the chaplain is a superior.

To those officers ranked higher than commander, the chaplain is subordinate. Although this equivalency exists, RAN chaplains who are in divisions 1, 2 or 3 do not actually wear the rank of commander, and they hold no command privilege.

=== Romania ===
The rank of commander (Comandor in Romanian) is used by both the Romanian Air Force and Romanian Naval Forces. It is equivalent to the army rank of colonel (OF-5). In both cases, the rank is above Căpitan-comandor (lit. 'Captain-commander', OF-4). In the air force, Comandor is below the rank of General de flotilă aeriană (lit. 'Air flotilla general'), while in the navy it is below Contraamiral de flotilă (lit. 'Flotilla counter admiral'). The rank was also used in the Royal Romanian Air Force and Navy until the proclamation of the Republic.

=== Scandinavia ===
Commander is a naval rank in Scandinavia (orlogskaptein in Danish and Norwegian, orlogskaptein in Swedish) The Scandinavian rank of commander is immediately above "kapteinløytnant" (Danish: kapteinløynant)

==== Denmark ====
In Denmark, the rank of commander exists as kommandørkaptajn (commander captain or commanding captain), which is senior to orlogskaptajn (captain) and kommandør (commander), which is senior to kommandørkaptajn. Kommandørkaptajn is officially translated into English as "Commander, Senior Grade", while orlogskaptajn is officially translated as '"Commander."

=== United Kingdom ===
==== Royal Navy ====
A commander in the Royal Navy is above the rank of lieutenant commander, below the rank of captain, and is equivalent in rank to a lieutenant colonel in the army. A commander may command a frigate, destroyer, submarine, aviation squadron or shore installation, or may serve on a staff.

==== Royal Air Force ====
Since the British Royal Air Force's mid-rank officers' ranks are modeled on those of the Royal Navy, the term wing commander is used as a rank, and this is the equivalent of a lieutenant colonel in the army or a commander in the navy. The rank of wing commander is above that of squadron leader and below that of group captain. In the former Royal Naval Air Service, which was merged with the Royal Flying Corps to form the Royal Air Force in 1918, the pilots held appointments as well as their normal ranks in the Royal Navy, and they wore insignia appropriate to the appointment instead of the rank. A flight commander wore a star above a lieutenant's two rank stripes, squadron commander wore two stars above two rank stripes (less than eight years' seniority) or two-and-a-half rank stripes (over eight years seniority), and wing commander wore three rank stripes. The rank stripes had the usual Royal Navy curl, and they were surmounted by an eagle.

=== United States ===
In the United States Navy, United States Coast Guard, United States Public Health Service Commissioned Corps, and National Oceanic and Atmospheric Administration Commissioned Officer Corps, commander (abbreviated "CDR") is a senior-grade officer rank, with the pay grade of O-5. Commander ranks above lieutenant commander (O-4) and below captain. (O-6). Commander is equivalent to the rank of lieutenant colonel in the United States Army, United States Air Force, United States Marine Corps, and United States Space Force. Notably, commander is the first rank at which the holder wears an embellished cap, whereas officers of the other military services are entitled to embellishment of similar headgear at O-4 rank.

Promotion to commander in the U.S. Navy is governed by United States Department of Defense policies derived from the Defense Officer Personnel Management Act (DOPMA) of 1980 or its companion Reserve Officer Personnel Management Act (ROPMA). DOPMA/ROPMA guidelines suggest that 70% of lieutenant commanders should be promoted to commander after serving a minimum of three years at their present rank and after attaining 15 to 17 years of cumulative commissioned service, although this percentage may vary and be appreciably less for certain officer designators (i.e., primary "specialties") depending on defense budgets, force structure, and the needs of the service.

== Commander as a military appointment ==
For instance, as in various small colonial settlements (such as various Caribbean islands) commanding the garrison was the crux of the top job, the military title Commandeur could be used instead of a civilian gubernatorial style, not unlike the Portuguese captain-major.

=== British Army ===
In the British Army, the term "commander" is officially applied to the non-commissioned officer in charge of a section (section commander), vehicle (vehicle commander) or gun (gun commander), to the subaltern or captain commanding a platoon (platoon commander), or to the brigadier commanding a brigade (brigade commander). Other officers commanding units are usually referred to as the officer commanding (OC), commanding officer (CO), general officer commanding (GOC), or general officer commanding-in-chief (GOC-C), depending on rank and position, although the term "commander" may be applied to them informally.

In the First Aid Nursing Yeomanry commander is a rank equivalent to major.

=== Netherlands ===
Commandeur as a title of colonial office was the case on the island of Tobago in the Dutch colony of Nieuw Walcheren.

=== New Zealand Army ===
The usage is similar/identical to the British Army, with the term "commander" having been applied to the colonel who was commander, 2 Land Force Group, Linton Camp, and now to commander, 1 Brigade.

=== Spanish Armed Forces and Guardia Civil ===
In the Spanish Army, the Spanish Air Force and the marine infantry, the term commander is the literal translation of comandante, the Spanish equivalent of a Commonwealth major. The Guardia Civil shares the army ranks, and the officer commanding a house-garrison (usually an NCO or a lieutenant, depending on the size) is addressed as the comandante de puesto (post commander).

=== United States Army ===
In the United States Army, the term "commander" is officially applied to the commanding officer of army units; hence, there are company commanders, battalion commanders, brigade commanders, and so forth. At the highest levels of U.S. military command structure, "commander" also refers to what used to be called commander-in-chief, or CINC, until October 24, 2002, although the term CINC is still used in casual speech.

=== United States Air Force ===
In the United States Air Force, the term "commander" (abbreviated "CC" in office symbols, i.e. "OG/CC" for "operations group commander") is applied officially to the commanding officer of an Air Force unit; hence, there are flight commanders, squadron commanders, group commanders, wing commanders, numbered air force commanders, and commanders of major commands. In rank, a flight commander is typically a lieutenant or captain, a squadron commander is typically a major or lieutenant colonel, a group commander is typically a colonel, a wing commander is typically a senior colonel or a brigadier general, a numbered air force commander is a major general or lieutenant general, and the commander of a major command is a general.

=== United States Space Force ===
In the United States Space Force, the term "commander" is applied officially to the commanding officer of a Space Force unit; hence, there are squadron commanders, delta commanders, and commanders of field commands. In rank, a squadron commander is a lieutenant colonel, a delta commander is a colonel, and the commander of a field command is a major general or lieutenant general.

== Commander as a non-military rank or title ==
=== NASA rank ===
In NASA spacecraft missions since the beginning of Project Gemini, one crew member on each spacecraft is designated as mission commander. The commander is the captain of the ship, and makes all real-time critical decisions on behalf of the crew and in coordination with the Mission Control Center (MCC).

=== Use in aviation ===
The title of aircraft commander is used in civil aviation to refer to the pilot in command (commonly referred to as "captain", which is technically an airline rank and not related to the commander's role on board the aircraft). in Germany during the 1930s and 1940s, the term Flugkapitän was an term used to describe a test pilot.

=== British police rank ===
Epaulette of a commander in the Metropolitan Police

Within the British police, Commander is a chief officer rank in the two police forces responsible for law enforcement within London, the Metropolitan Police and City of London Police. In both forces, the rank is senior to chief superintendent; in the Metropolitan Police it is junior to deputy assistant commissioner and in the City of London Police it is junior to assistant commissioner. In forces outside London, the rank equates to assistant chief constable which bears the same insignia.

Epaulette of a commander in the City of London Police

The Metropolitan Police introduced the rank in 1946, after the rank of deputy assistant commissioner was split in two, with senior DACs keeping that rank and title and junior DACs being regraded as commanders. The Metropolitan Police also used the rank of deputy commander, ranking just below that of commander, between 1946 and 1968.

Officers in charge of the twelve geographical Basic Command Units are referred to as "BCU commander". However, the officers do not hold the rank of commander but instead hold the rank of chief superintendent. Prior to organisational change merging boroughs in to BCUs, officers in charge of policing each of the London's boroughs were given the title "borough commander". A previous exception to this was the borough commander of Westminster, who held the rank of commander due to the size, complexity, and high-profile nature of the borough.

The Metropolitan Police Service announced that by summer 2018 the rank would be phased out, along with that of chief inspector. However, in August 2017 it was announced that the new Commissioner Cressida Dick had cancelled the plan to phase them out.

The rank badge worn by a commander or an assistant chief constable consists of crossed tipstaves within a wreath. Within the Metropolitan Police Service, the tips of the tipstaves are blue and not red, unlike other forces. Until the abolition of the rank of deputy commander in 1968, however, a commander wore the same badge of rank as a deputy assistant commissioner.

=== Australian police rank ===
In Australia, commander is a rank used by the Victorian, Tasmanian, Western Australian, South Australian, and Australian Federal police forces. The insignia consists of a crown over three bath stars in a triangular formation, equivalent to a brigadier in the army. In all four forces, it is junior to the rank of assistant commissioner, and senior to the rank of chief superintendent, with the exception of Western Australia and Victoria where it is senior to the rank of superintendent.

In New South Wales the position of commander is instated to officers (usually superintendents) in charge of a command or unit.

=== American police rank ===
Some large police departments and sheriff's offices in the US have a commander rank. Most commonly, this is the next rank above captain. Examples of this include the Chicago Police Department, Los Angeles Police Department, San Francisco Police Department, Portland Police Bureau and Rochester Police Department. In others, such as the Phoenix Police Department and Saint Paul Police Department, a commander rank is the next rank above lieutenant, and is equivalent to captain. In the Northport, Florida's police department, however, commanders are below captains.

A commander in the LAPD is equivalent to an inspector in other large US departments (such as the NYPD); the LAPD rank was originally called inspector as well, but was changed in 1974 to commander. The Metropolitan Police Department of the District of Columbia also uses the rank of commander, which is a grade above inspector and two grades above captain. In the Montgomery County, MD police department a commander is a captain assigned to command a police district. The Jacksonville Sheriff's Office replaced the Assistant Chief rank with commander.

The insignia worn is commonly every insignia between major and major general, depending on the police or sheriff's department. Albuquerque Police Department commanders are captain equivalents, however, with the brass version of the captain's insignia. In some other police or sheriff's departments where the captains have brass insignias instead of silver, such as Florida's Lee County Sheriff's Department, commanders are above captains, and below majors, with the insignia being brass captain's bars with wreathes around. Northport's police commanders have the insignia of second lieutenants. Commander is also used as a title in certain circumstances, such as the commander of a squad of detectives, who would usually be of the rank of lieutenant, and in some police or sheriff's departments where commanders are ranks, officers or deputies of separate ranks are also referred to as commander by title.

=== Canadian police rank ===
The Montreal police force, Service de police de la Ville de Montréal, uses the rank of commander (Commandant).

=== Incident Command System ===
In the Incident Command System the incident commander is in charge of the response to an emergency. The title may pass from person to person as the incident develops.

=== Chivalric orders ===
The title of commander is used in chivalric orders such as the Sovereign Military Order of Malta for a member senior to a knight. The title of knight commander is often used to denote an even higher rank. These conventions are also used by most of the continental orders of chivalry. The United Kingdom uses different classifications.

In most of the British orders of knighthood, the grade of knight (or dame) commander is the lowest grade of knighthood, but is above the grade of companion (which does not carry a knighthood). In the Royal Victorian Order and the Order of the British Empire, the grade of commander is senior to the grade of lieutenant or officer, but junior to that of knight or dame commander. In the British Venerable Order of Saint John, a commander ranks below a knight.

== Insignia ==
Commander
(Antigua and Barbuda Coast Guard)

Commander
(Royal Australian Navy)

Commander
(Royal Bahamas Defence Force)

Commander
(Bangladesh Navy)

Komander
( Royal Brunei Navy)

Commander
(Barbados Coast Guard)

Commander
(Belize Coast Guard)

Commander
(Royal Canadian Navy)

Kommandør
(Royal Danish Navy)

Commander
(Republic of Fiji Navy)

Komentaja
Swedish: Kommendör
(Finnish Navy)

Commander
(Gambian Navy)

Commander
(Ghana Navy)

Commander
(Guyana Coast Guard)

Commander
Hindi: कमांडर, romanized: kamaandar
(Indian Navy)

Commander
Irish: Ceannasaí
(Irish Naval Service)

Commander
(Jamaican Coast Guard)

Commander
(Liberian National Coast Guard)

Komandoras
(Lithuanian Naval Force)

Komander
(Royal Malaysian Navy)

Commander
(Namibian Navy)

Commander
(Royal New Zealand Navy)

Commander
(Nigerian Navy)

Kommandør
(Royal Norwegian Navy)

Commander
Urdu: کمانڈر, romanized: commander
(Pakistan Navy)

Komandor
(Polish Navy)

Comandor
(Romanian Naval Forces)

Comandor
(Romanian Air Force)

Commander
(Saint Kitts and Nevis Coast Guard)

Commander
(Sierra Leone Navy)

Commander
(South African Navy)

Commander
(Sri Lanka Navy)

Kommendör
(Swedish Navy)

Commander
(Tanzania Naval Command)

Commander
(Tongan Maritime Force)

Commander
(Trinidad and Tobago Coast Guard)

Commander
(Royal Navy)

Commander
(United States Navy)

Commander
(United States Coast Guard)

Commander
(NOAA Commissioned Officer Corps and United States Public Health Service Commissioned Corps)

== See also ==
- Comparative military ranks
