= Assistant chief constable =

Third highest rank in British territorial police

UK Police Assistant Chief Constable Epaulette

Assistant chief constable (ACC) is the third highest rank in all British territorial police forces (except the Metropolitan Police and City of London Police, in which the equivalent rank is commander), as well as the British Transport Police, Ministry of Defence Police and Civil Nuclear Constabulary.

Each force has between one and six assistant chief constables. They are the lowest officers at chief officer level, below the chief constable and deputy chief constable, and rank immediately above chief superintendents. Assistant chief constables usually hold portfolios (e.g. for crime, operations or territorial policing). In larger forces, ACCs may be given responsibilities for policing major territories within the force area.

Senior police civilian staff (such as directors of finance and resources) hold equivalent status and are generally known as assistant chief officers.

== Insignia ==
The rank badge worn by an assistant chief constable or a commander consists of crossed tipstaves within a wreath, roughly analogous to the former insignia of a brigadier-general in the British Army or Royal Marines, which was a crossed sword and baton, sans wreath.

== See also ==
- Police ranks of the United Kingdom
