= Douglas Osmond =

Sir Douglas Osmond (27 June 1914 – 20 April 2006) was the chief constable of Shropshire Constabulary and later Hampshire Constabulary.

== Biography ==
Douglas Osmond was born in Bournemouth, the son of a schoolteacher mother and a father who was killed in action during the First World War. He was educated at local schools, and in 1932 won a Kitchener Scholarship to read Mathematics at University College London where he graduated as Bachelor of Science (BSc).

He joined the Metropolitan Police in 1935, where he rose to Inspector, before being called up to join the Royal Navy during the Second World War in December 1943. He was stationed in training roles at home and lectured in navigation at the Royal Naval College, Greenwich where he noted his pupils included five future admirals. He was released from the service in October 1944 to join the Allied Control Commission where he took part in the projected reorganisation of the German civilian police force and the organisation of British policing systems in Germany after the war.

In 1945 he returned to the British police and was appointed as the Chief Constable of Shropshire, (now part of West Mercia Constabulary), in 1946. At 32, he was one of the youngest to have achieved this position in the United Kingdom. (The youngest was Sir Eric St Johnston who, in 1940 at the age of 29, was appointed chief constable of Oxfordshire Constabulary). Equally remarkable was his rise through the ranks at a time when most chief constables were externally appointed.

In 1962, Osmond left to become the chief constable of Hampshire and Isle of Wight Constabulary, and in 1967 he presided over its amalgamation with the Portsmouth and Southampton City forces. At this point the force was renamed Hampshire Constabulary and Osmond remained chief constable until his retirement from the post in 1977.

== Personal life and death ==
Osmond married in 1958 Eve Finnemore, who died in 1995, with whom he had two daughters. Osmond died on 20 April 2006, aged 91.

== Honours ==

During his life Osmond received the following honours:

- 1958: OBE
- 1962: QPM
- 1968: CBE
- 1971: OStJ
- 1971: Knight Bachelor
- 1981: Deputy Lieutenant of Hampshire
- War Medal 1939–1945
- Defence Medal
- Police Long Service and Good Conduct Medal

== See also ==
- Hampshire Constabulary
- Policing in the United Kingdom

== Sources ==
- Rolling, S. (2006). "Obituary - Douglas Osmond". Frontline (Hampshire Constabulary newspaper). June 2005. Portsmouth.
- (2006). "Sir Douglas Osmond obituary". Daily Telegraph. 28 April 2006.

Police appointments
Preceded by Anthony Tew	Chief Constable of Shropshire Constabulary; 1946–1962	Succeeded by Robert George Fenwick
Preceded by Sir Richard Dawnay Lemon	Chief Constable of Hampshire and Isle of Wight Constabulary; 1962–1967	Succeeded by End of Title
Preceded by Post Created	Chief Constable of Hampshire Constabulary; 1967–1977	Succeeded by Sir John Duke
