= Head constable =

Rank in some police forces

Head constable was a rank used in some British and British colonial police forces, and is still used in the Indian police and Central Armed Police Forces.

== England and Wales ==
Originally, head constable was the normal title for the chief officer of a borough police force in England and Wales. Throughout the later 19th century and early 20th century, this title was superseded by chief constable in most forces. A few smaller borough forces and the Liverpool City Police retained it until it was finally abolished under the Police Act 1919. However, Winchester City Police appears to have retained the title until 1943, when it was amalgamated with Hampshire Constabulary.

== India ==
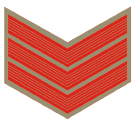
Insignia of an Indian police head constable.

Three white point-down chevrons.

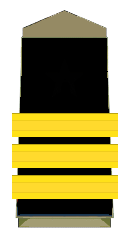
Three bars on epaulettes (Maharashtra Police only)

Head constable in the Indian police is equivalent to sergeant in police forces in other countries. Head constables wear three point-down chevrons on their sleeves or three bars on their epaulettes. In Kerala Police, when serving in the local police, a head constable is designated as a senior civil police officer (SCPO).

In some state police forces, such as the Odisha Police, the rank of havildar is used and is considered equivalent to the rank of head constable. In the Kerala Police, however, the rank of havildar exists only in the Armed Police cadre.

== Ireland and colonial police forces ==
In the Royal Irish Constabulary, Royal Ulster Constabulary (until its reorganisation in 1970), and some colonial forces such as the Palestine Police, head constable was a rank between the sergeant and inspector grades, roughly equivalent to a warrant officer in the Army. In colonial forces, it was usually a rank held by Europeans only. Some colonial forces also had a higher rank of head constable major.
