= Martin Hawke, 7th Baron Hawke =

English cricketer (1860–1938)

The Right Honourable The Lord Hawke
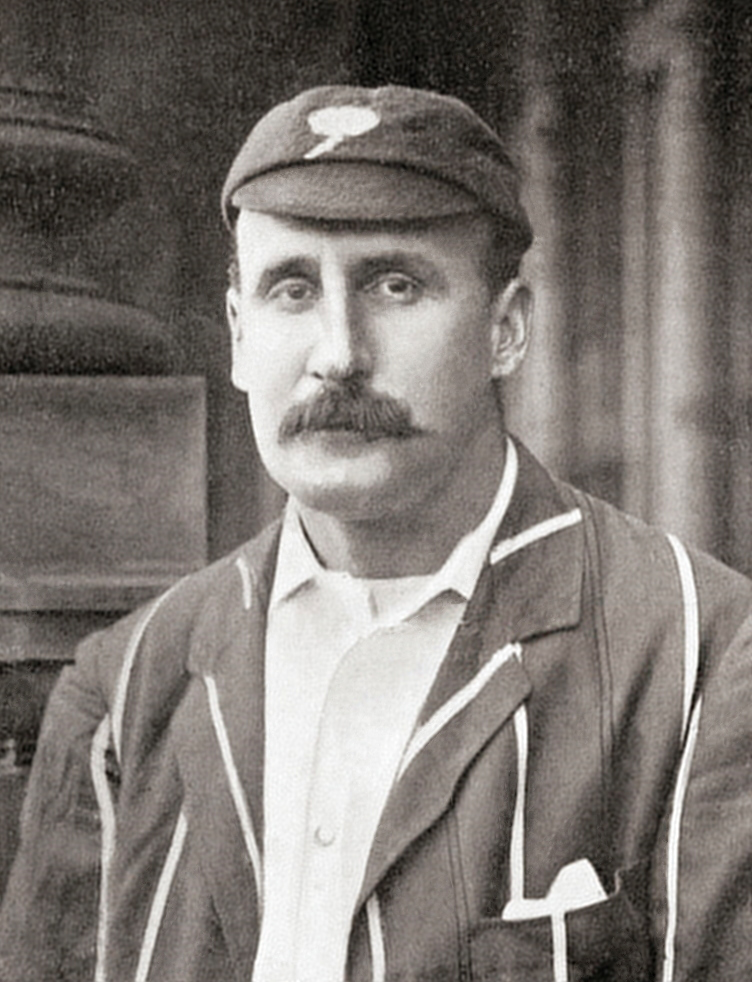
- Lord Hawke, c. 1899

Personal information
- Full name: Martin Bladen Hawke
- Born: 16 August 1860; Gainsborough, Lincolnshire, England
- Died: 10 October 1938 (aged 78); Edinburgh, Scotland
- Batting: Right-handed
- Role: Batsman
- Relatives: Anthony Tew (nephew); John Tew (nephew)

International information
- National side: England
- Test debut (cap 96): 13 February 1896 v South Africa
- Last Test: 4 April 1899 v South Africa

Domestic team information
- Years: Team
- 1881–1911: Yorkshire
- 1882–1885: Cambridge University
- 1884–1912: MCC

Career statistics
Competition	Test	First-class
Matches	5	633
Runs scored	55	16,749
Batting average	7.85	20.15
100s/50s	0/0	13/69
Top score	30	166
Balls bowled	0	20
Wickets	–	0
Bowling average	–	–
5 wickets in innings	–	–
10 wickets in match	–	–
Best bowling	–	–
Catches/stumpings	3/–	209/–
- Source: CricketArchive, 18 July 2010

Martin Bladen Hawke, 7th Baron Hawke (16 August 1860 – 10 October 1938), generally known as Lord Hawke, was an English amateur cricketer active from 1881 to 1911 who played for Yorkshire and England. He was born in Willingham by Stow, near Gainsborough, Lincolnshire, and died in Edinburgh. He appeared in 633 first-class matches, including five Test matches, as a righthanded batsman, scoring 16,749 runs with a highest score of 166 and held 209 catches. He scored 13 centuries and 69 half-centuries.

Since an 1870 inheritance of his father, Hawke was styled Hon.; he inherited the barony on 5 December 1887 on the death of his father, Rev. Rt. Hon. Edward Henry Julius Hawke, Rector of Willingham 1854–1875, after which the family returned to its seat (main home held for a generation or more), Wighill House and Park, near Tadcaster, Yorkshire. Admiral Hawke, the first Baron, was among the few Admirals elevated for his roles during the Seven Years' War: at the Battle of Quiberon Bay, off Nantes, France, and promoting the Western Squadron blockade of France.

Hawke was educated at Eton, where he was a member of the school cricket eleven in 1878 and 1879. As he had been a moderate scholar, his father decided he should receive private tuition at home for two years. In October 1881, Hawke went up to Magdalene College, Cambridge, where he was a member of the Cambridge University Cricket Club team from 1882 to 1885. He won a Cambridge blue three times: in 1882, 1883 and 1885. He was captain of the Cambridge team in the 1885 season.

After Hawke left Eton in July 1879 and began his two years of private tuition, he was invited by the Reverend Edmund Carter to play for the Yorkshire Gentlemen's Cricket Club, which was based at the Yorkshire Gentlemen Cricket Club Ground in York. Living at Wighill Park since 1875 had given Hawke a residential qualification to play for the county club.

In September 1881, Carter invited him to the Scarborough Festival where he made his first-class debut for Yorkshire against Marylebone Cricket Club (MCC). Hawke went to Cambridge a month later and played for the university team from May to July 1882 before returning to Yorkshire. At this time, Hawke was usually the only amateur in the Yorkshire team. He refused the captaincy at first, saying he wanted to learn the job by playing under the professional captain, Test bowler Tom Emmett. Hawke was formally appointed club captain for the 1883 season, though he was still at Cambridge, and held the post until 1910. He remains the most successful county captain ever, Yorkshire winning the County Championship a record eight times during his tenure.

As a captain, Hawke was noted for taking a strong, and some would say paternalistic, interest in the welfare of his professional players. Certain aspects of this policy caused resentment but he was on the whole respected for it. Even so, he was strict on discipline and expelled the England bowler Bobby Peel from first-class cricket after he went out to play in a drunken state.

During his playing career, Hawke became an influential figure in cricket administration. He was elected Yorkshire club president in 1898, while still captaining the team, and held the post until his death. He had a missionary-like zeal to develop cricket overseas and undertook nine tours as a player between 1887–88 and 1911–12, leading teams to Australia, India (twice), North America (twice), South Africa (twice), the West Indies and Argentina. All five of Hawke's Test appearances were made in South Africa. He captained England four times and was always on the winning side.

After he retired from playing, Hawke became a major figure at MCC as well as at Yorkshire. He was appointed President of MCC for 1914 and retained the post, which is normally an annual appointment, through the First World War. He was appointed Honorary Treasurer of MCC from 1932 to 1937. As an administrator, he held considerable influence but came under some criticism. He was accused of inactivity at the time of the Bodyline controversy. Most famously, he was disparaged for his oft-quoted and oft-misquoted statement: "Pray God, no professional shall ever captain England". Hawke's biographer noted that "his blunders on numerous public forums were to blight his declining years".

Hawke married in 1916 but he and his wife had no children. After 1924, when the lease on Wighill Park expired, the couple lived in North Berwick. His wife died in 1936 and Hawke himself died in hospital following a collapse at his home. He was succeeded as Baron Hawke by his younger brother.

== Personal and family life ==
Martin Bladen Hawke was born on 16 August 1860 at Willingham Rectory, Gainsborough, Lincolnshire. He was the sixth child, and eldest surviving son, of Edward Henry Julius Hawke, 6th Baron Hawke of Towton, and Baroness Hawke (née Jane Dowker). His father was Rector at Willingham from 1854 to 1875. Hawke's first school was at Newark and then he attended St Michael's, Aldin House in Slough, a preparatory school for Eton College, which Hawke attended from 1874 to 1879. After Eton, his father decided he should have private tuition for two years, as he was a moderate scholar only, and it was not until October 1881 that Hawke went to Magdalene College, Cambridge, where he stayed until 1885. At Cambridge, he was a member of the University Pitt Club.

From 1870, when his father succeeded to the barony, Hawke was styled The Honourable. In 1875, the family moved from Willingham to Wighill Park, near Tadcaster, the lease of which was subsidised by a family friend, and Wighill was the baronial seat for the next fifty years until the lease expired. Hawke's residency at Wighill Park enabled him to play for Yorkshire County Cricket Club under county cricket qualification rules that had been introduced in 1873.

On 5 December 1887, Hawke succeeded as 7th Baron on the death of his father and was henceforward known universally as Lord Hawke. He married Marjory Nelson Ritchie (a.k.a. Maud) Edwards, daughter of W. Peacock Edwards, on 1 June 1916, less than a year after the death of his mother, with whom he had lived formerly. His best man was his close friend Christopher Heseltine, with whom he played cricket alongside and travelled the world extensively with. Marjory was a widow (of Arthur J. G. Cross, with whom she had Marjory Lindesay-Bethune, Countess of Lindsay) and the same age as Hawke. The couple had no children and, when Hawke died, the title passed to his younger brother. When the lease on Wighill expired in 1924, the Hawkes removed to Marjory's home at North Berwick where they lived for the rest of their lives.

During his time at Cambridge University, Hawke had been commissioned into the 5th West Yorkshire Militia and, in 1890, he put himself forward for military duties. He gained the rank of captain and later became an honorary major in the service of the 3rd Battalion of the Prince of Wales' Own Yorkshire Regiment. He gained the rank of colonel in the service of the West Riding Volunteer Regiment. In the non-military sphere, Hawke held the office of justice of the peace (JP) for the West Riding of Yorkshire.

Hawke died, aged 78, on 10 October 1938 in a nursing home at West End, Edinburgh, following an emergency operation after he collapsed at his home in North Berwick. Although he was cremated at Edinburgh Crematorium, his ashes were taken to be interred at West Norwood Cemetery, in the London Borough of Lambeth, alongside those of his late wife who had pre-deceased him on 25 January 1936. His sister's sons, Anthony Tew and John Tew, were both first-class cricketers.

== Playing career in England ==
=== Early years ===
Hawke inherited a keen interest in cricket from his father, who was involved with the Willingham village club and was passionate about the sport. Having played at his early schools, Hawke made 19 known appearances for the Eton College team between 1876 and 1879. He was coached at Eton by Mike Mitchell who transformed the school's cricket team during the 1870s and developed other noted players such as Alfred Lyttelton, Charles Studd and Ivo Bligh. Hawke made his first appearance at Lord's in July 1878 when he played in the prestigious Eton v Harrow match.

In the two years when Hawke had private tuition at home, from summer 1879 to October 1881, he played for the York-based Yorkshire Gentlemen's Cricket Club, whose leading light was the Reverend Edmund Carter, a man whose influence would guide Hawke towards the captaincy of Yorkshire.

In September 1881, Carter invited Hawke to the Scarborough Festival where he made his first-class debut for Yorkshire on 1 and 2 September, two weeks after his 21st birthday. The match was Yorkshire v Marylebone Cricket Club (MCC) at North Marine Road and Hawke, who was bowled by Billy Barnes in both innings, scored 4 and 0. MCC won by an innings and 35 runs. A few days later, in another Festival match, Hawke played for Yorkshire against I Zingari and made a top score of 32 in Yorkshire's second innings as they were beaten by 159 runs.

=== 1882 to 1885 ===
Hawke's third first-class appearance was his debut for Cambridge University on 12 and 13 June 1882 when he played against Lancashire at Old Trafford. He made 18 first-class appearances in 1882, scoring 570 runs at 18.38 with two half-centuries and a top score of 66. He played for Cambridge four times in June, including the University Match against Oxford University at Lord's and gained the first of his three blues. From July to September, he played in 13 games for Yorkshire.

When Hawke rejoined Yorkshire in July 1882, the team's professional captain Tom Emmett offered to stand down but Hawke refused and insisted on learning the job by playing under Emmett. James Coldham quoted Hawke as saying to Emmett that he wanted to "pick up a few wrinkles first". Hawke and Emmett got along very well, despite their social differences, and Hawke played to the end of August under Emmett's leadership, often being the only amateur in the team. There had been few amateur cricketers in the Yorkshire team before Hawke and there had been complaints from the cricket establishment that the Yorkshire Committee preferred to play professionals. This had much to do with the clash between the county club and Carter's Yorkshire Gentlemen but there was in fact a shortage of suitably talented amateurs too. Hawke assumed the captaincy for the two Scarborough Festival matches against MCC and I Zingari. At the end of the 1882 season, though he had just turned 22, Hawke was appointed Yorkshire club captain, the first amateur to hold the position. He remained in charge for 28 seasons until 1910, during which time the team won eight County Championships, still a record for one captain in county cricket.

In a tribute to Hawke, the editor of Wisden Cricketers' Almanack related that Hawke's "strength of the character was tested" when, as a young man on leaving Cambridge, he undertook the responsibility of captaining the Yorkshire side, composed at that time of "elements that were not entirely harmonious". Owing to Hawke's "tact, judgment and integrity", he moulded the Eleven into "the best, and probably the most united county cricket team in England". Derek Birley commented on the Yorkshire team to 1883 as "gifted but scarcely house-trained professionals" who were often described as "ten drunks and a parson". The odd man out was Louis Hall, a Nonconformist lay preacher who had joined Yorkshire in 1873 as an opening batsman and was reputedly the first teetotaller ever to play for them. Their best players included Emmett, Ephraim Lockwood, George Ulyett, Ted Peate, Billy Bates and Allen Hill, while Bobby Peel made his first-class debut for Yorkshire in July 1882. Birley added that their performances and "rough-hewn image" had become an embarrassment to the gentlemanly wing of the club and the decision was taken to appoint a captain who would "instill discipline and sobriety into this wayward team".

Hawke's task was not only to eradicate the drink problem but also, in Birley's view, "to unite the club's geographical and social factions" and try to produce a winning team. Yorkshire had evolved from the old Sheffield Cricket Club and it had been the case since its foundation in 1863 that all fourteen members of the County Committee were elected by Sheffield districts; and all fourteen of these committee men plus the secretary Joseph Wostinholm were loyal to the president and treasurer, Michael Ellison. As a result, to the chagrin and vociferous opposition of the rest of the county, Ellison and Sheffield effectively controlled Yorkshire cricket. Edmund Carter was one of Ellison's main critics and opponents. At the end of the 1882 season, in addition to appointing Hawke as captain, the committee agreed to reorganise itself for the first time since the club's foundation. Admitting that it should represent the views of Yorkshire as a whole, the committee enlarged itself from 14 to 21 by inviting seven new members: one each from Bradford, Dewsbury, Halifax, Huddersfield, Hull, Leeds and York in addition to the existing 14 from Sheffield. So, although the other districts now had a voice, the Sheffield contingent retained complete control. However, York's representative was Edmund Carter and, although there was now reduced friction in Yorkshire's affairs, the issue of representation had only been deferred.

Hawke at this time had minimal influence and Coldham wrote that he cannot be seen as anything more than an "instrument of change", though his appointment did represent a "watershed" in the club's history. Whatever the extent of Hawke's involvement in the 1882 machinations, ten years would pass before Yorkshire was fully reorganised and, coincidentally, it was in 1893 that Hawke's team won Yorkshire's first official County Championship. Birley wrote that Yorkshire, "restored to feudalism", was now "ready to play the establishment game".

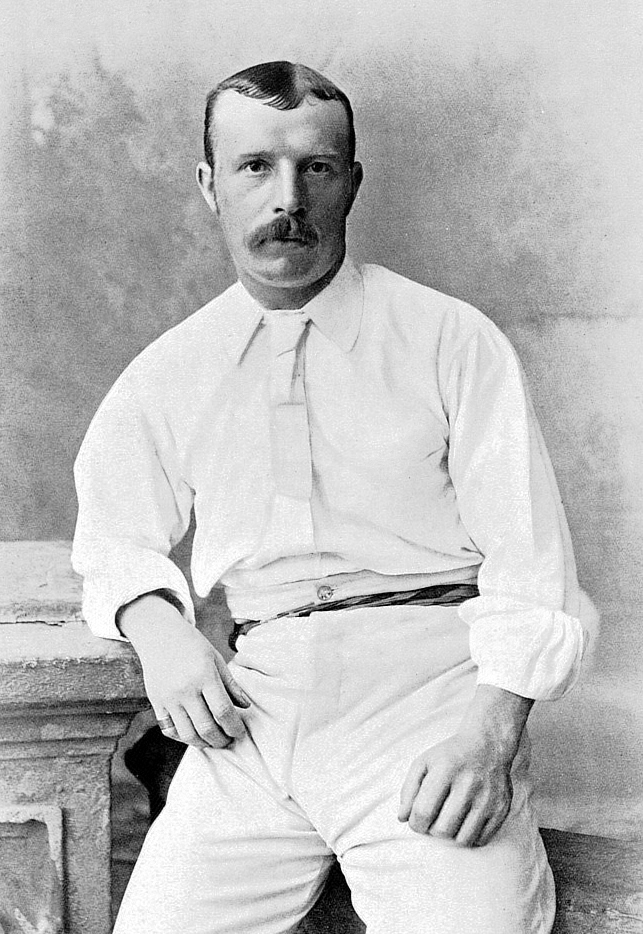
Bobby Peel

Hawke enjoyed a personal success in the second match of the 1883 season when he scored his maiden first-class century with 141 for Cambridge against C I Thornton's XI at Fenner's. He shared a third wicket partnership of 160 with Cambridge captain Charles Studd against a bowling attack that included Test players Billy Barnes, Ted Peate and George Ulyett. The match was drawn due to interruptions by rain after Thornton's XI scored 175 and 229; Cambridge replied with 317 and 44–3.

Hawke's appointment as Yorkshire captain brought early success as the team enjoyed a good season in 1883 with a record of 9 wins and 5 draws in 16 inter-county matches. In 1884, Yorkshire won half their inter-county matches, 8 out of 16, but four defeats left them well adrift of Nottinghamshire in the unofficial championship standings. In his 1924 memoirs, Recollections and Reminiscences, Hawke described the 1884 season as "my least successful" and explained that militia duties had interfered with his cricket at Cambridge, for whom he made only two appearances with modest scores in both. With Hawke mostly absent, Louis Hall took over the captaincy.

Hawke was more absent in 1885 when, with Hall again leading the team, Yorkshire won seven of their 16 inter-county matches and had the second best record after Nottinghamshire, whom they defeated by an innings and 28 runs, the only match that Nottinghamshire lost.

From his first match as Yorkshire captain in August 1882, Hawke played in only nineteen out of 67 first team games between then and September 1885. The captaincy, for all intents and purposes, had gone back to the professionals with first Emmett and then Hall having taken over. Hall led the team in 37 matches through 1884 and 1885.

Hawke made eight appearances for Cambridge in 1885 with a best score of 73 against MCC and he played his last match for them in June against Oxford.

=== 1886 to 1889 ===
Although some people assumed that Hawke had turned his back on Yorkshire, he returned with new vigour in 1886 to begin what he himself referred to as his consistent association with the county. While Hawke had formerly been the figurehead who tossed the coin, he now took complete charge of operations and began the transformation of the team in earnest. The team that Hawke inherited from Emmett, which Hawke referred to as "the boys of my old brigade", was in decline by 1886 and several players would retire or be dismissed during the next couple of years so that, by the end of the 1887 season, it was clear that Yorkshire faced what Coldham called "a protracted period of rebuilding". Within the next seasons, the likes of Ted Peate, Billy Bates, Tom Emmett, Louis Hall and George Ulyett had all retired. Left arm spinner Bobby Peel, wicket-keeper David Hunter, all-rounder George Hirst, opening batsman Jack Brown and the amateurs Stanley Jackson and Ernest Smith were among the replacements who formed Yorkshire's successful teams of the 1890s and 1900s.

In addition to drinking, the "old brigade" had a professional problem in their poor standard of fielding. In a history of Yorkshire cricket to the end of the 19th century, the author commented that the Yorkshire team was "terribly slack in the field" and their reputation, which became a joke among county players, was such that they were believed to be too polite to run anyone out. For example, W. G. Grace said of Bates that he would have been the "greatest all-rounder of his time but for his poor fielding". Hawke was determined to address both of these problems and said in his memoirs of the fielding problem that he had "never known a side do well that could not hold catches".

Yorkshire finished fifth under Hawke's leadership in 1886 and he enjoyed a personal success when he scored his maiden Yorkshire century against Sussex at Hove with 144 out of a total of 284 in the first innings. Hawke also made four half-centuries and his total runs for the season, his best to date, was 831 at an average of 23.74.

In 1887, Yorkshire finished third behind the strong Surrey team of the time. Peel was an early success but Hawke later recollected that "it was the only summer when Yorkshire's batting proved distinctly superior to its bowling". He had a good season with the bat himself, just missing his thousand runs with a total of 967 at an average of 24.79. He made one century and five fifties, the century being an innings of 125 against Lancashire in the Roses Match at Old Trafford. Hawke made his runs in a total of 414 which enabled Yorkshire to win by an innings and 39 runs.

Yorkshire improved in 1888 to finish second behind Surrey but Hawke's contribution was modest. He played in only 10 matches and scored just 155 runs at the low average of 8.15. In 1889, Yorkshire finished last but one, in seventh place, despite an outstanding effort by Peel who was top of both the batting and bowling averages that year. Hawke himself had an indifferent season, averaging only 17.75, but his response was to dispense with the services of several players who were not up to standard. Club President Michael Ellison expressed his disapproval of the situation in an address to the committee: "The great difficulty with which they had to contend arose from what I might term the demon drink".

=== 1890 to 1892 ===
The club's preparations for the next season involved playing several trial matches, which Hawke encouraged the committee to arrange. The new team needed time to take shape although they did quite well in 1890 and finished third, again behind Surrey, and Derek Hodgson wrote that Hawke himself was "the most consistent batsman" that season. He scored 658 runs at 21.93 with a highest score of 74 among three half-centuries.

In the 1891 season, Yorkshire lost twice as many as they won, finishing last but one a second time. Hawke's own form was poorer than in 1890 and he scored only 344 runs at 13.23 but he did complete his fifth career century with 126 when he opened the innings for Yorkshire against Somerset at Taunton. The poor results in 1891 caused a fall in revenue as supporters stayed away and mounted a "Sack the Committee" campaign. Hodgson wrote that the complaints included the committee being out of touch and "needing greater knowledge of grassroots cricket", but the key demand was for a further reorganisation on a broader county basis. Yorkshire showed a slight improvement in 1892 while more team changes took place and finished sixth with five wins and five defeats. Hawke had another modest season with the bat, scoring 532 runs at 17.16 with a highest innings of 74 not out. The committee finally heeded the criticism and, by 1893, the Sheffield contingent had been reduced with other areas at last being given a greater say. Hawke, who had not been subject to criticism, was appointed one of two new vice-presidents. J. M. Kilburn stated that "Hawke's authority in the councils of Yorkshire grew because of the committee reorganisation of 1893 and grew again through his election to the office of President in 1898".

=== 1893 to 1896 ===
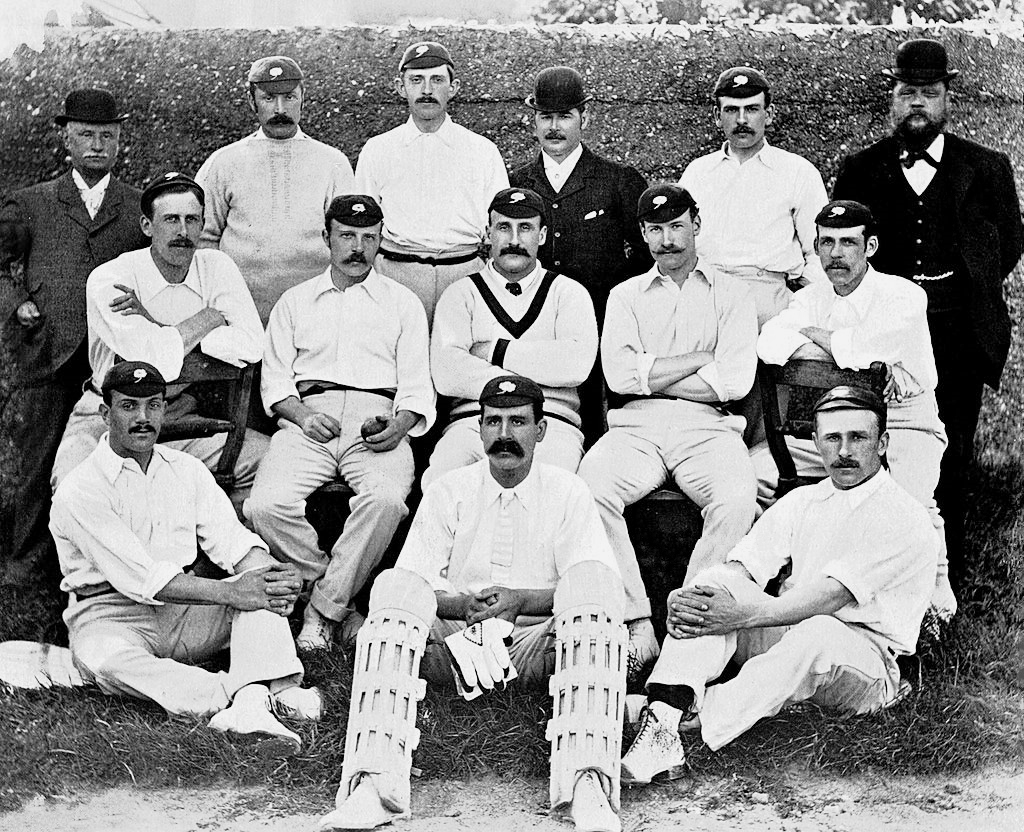
Yorkshire's team in 1895, captained by Lord Hawke

Hawke got what he wanted in 1893 as his new Yorkshire team fulfilled its promise and won the County Championship, the club's first-ever title. It was achieved by what Hodgson called "a cumulative effort", although the standout players were Ted Wainwright, Hirst and Peel; and was the "first confirmation of Hawke's striving for teamwork and discipline". Hawke himself played in only 11 matches that season and George Ulyett deputised for him as team captain. Hawke scored 241 runs at 15.06 with two half-centuries. With the title won by a team built on his principles and under his direction, Hawke established himself the de facto supremo of Yorkshire cricket. His captaincy had changed the character of cricket in the county and, for himself, he enjoyed cricket both as a pastime and in terms of his own growing influence upon it. In Kilburn's view, Hawke "accepted authority and the responsibilities of authority; he assumed the responsibilities of leadership and exercised them with determination to lead".

The combination of Hawke's methods and the professional approach of his players (including amateurs like Jackson) produced consistency and Yorkshire developed a "playing to win" philosophy that persisted into the latter half of the 20th century, the improvement in fielding being its most significant aspect. The consistency is evident in a glance at the championship standings from 1893 to 1909, effectively the rest of Hawke's captaincy, when the team had one fourth-place finish (1897) and were otherwise always in the top three with titles in 1893, 1896, 1898, 1900, 1901, 1902, 1905 and 1908.

Hawke had a better season in 1894 when he played 25 matches and scored 725 runs at 20.13 with a highest score of 157, his personal best to date, which he made for A. J. Webbe's XI against Cambridge University at Fenner's. In 1895, he played in 32 matches and had 51 innings which enabled him to complete 1,000 runs in the season for the only time in his career. He totalled 1,078 at 23.95 with a highest score of 79 among 7 half-centuries.

In 1896, when Yorkshire won their second championship, Hawke played in 26 matches and, for the first time, managed to score two centuries in a season. He began the season in great style after his return from a winter tour of South Africa, scoring a career-high 166 for Yorkshire against Warwickshire at Edgbaston as Yorkshire amassed a record 887 with Hawke and Peel sharing a partnership of 292 for the 8th wicket. Three weeks later he scored 110 not out for Yorkshire against Kent. Both these centuries were scored in May but Hawke did not maintain his fine start to the season and finished with a total of 708 runs at 24.41.

=== 1897 to 1902 ===
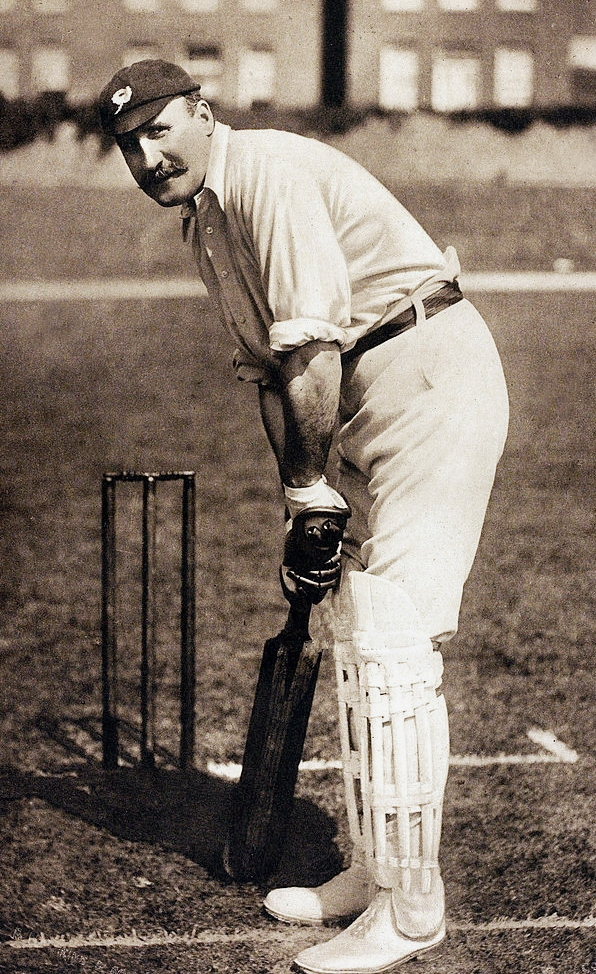
Lord Hawke c. 1900

One of Hawke's qualities as a leader was his willingness to impose discipline when necessary and a famous instance of this occurred in 1897 when he was forced to dismiss Bobby Peel from Yorkshire's service for drunkenness. However, Peel's replacement was Wilfred Rhodes who became arguably the club's greatest-ever player. Yorkshire won a third title in 1898, the same year that Hawke was elected Yorkshire President in succession to Michael Ellison, and he again scored two centuries in the season. He just missed his thousand runs, scoring 950 at 30.64 including scores of 107 not out for Yorkshire against Kent and 134 for Yorkshire against Warwickshire. In 1899, he scored 923 runs at 26.37 with a highest score of 127 for Yorkshire against Hampshire.

Swanton wrote that, by 1900, Hawke had "moulded Yorkshire into the finest side in the country" and they won the County Championship three years in succession from 1900 to 1902. They were "essentially a complete team" with the batting of Tunnicliffe, Brown and David Denton; the powerful all-round play of Hirst, Rhodes and Schofield Haigh; and, crucially given Test calls, "plentiful reserves of high quality". According to Kilburn, Hawke came to the "fulfilment of his cricketing ambitions" with the three successive titles which were "a logical culmination to ten years of cultivation". Hawke's own batting was variable during these three seasons. He had little success in 1900 but scored 902 runs and 7 half-centuries in 1901; and then 565 runs with 2 centuries and no half-centuries in 1902. His 1902 centuries were 107 not out for MCC against Oxford University and 126 for Yorkshire against Surrey.

Hawke's loyalty to Yorkshire was such that he would put county before country if an issue arose. In 1901, Hirst and Rhodes were invited to join a team organised by Archie MacLaren to tour Australia and Hawke refused to authorise their selection, preferring instead to have the Yorkshire Committee pay them compensation. Hawke was driven by principle as he strongly supported a demand for official sponsorship of England Tests at home and tours abroad. He believed that MCC should accept this responsibility and, when a year later they did, Hawke was more than willing to release his players to assist England. Hawke's concern was that any Yorkshire players on tour should be given the same care and consideration that they received from the county club and he believed that only MCC would share Yorkshire's sense of responsibility.

=== 1903 to 1911 ===
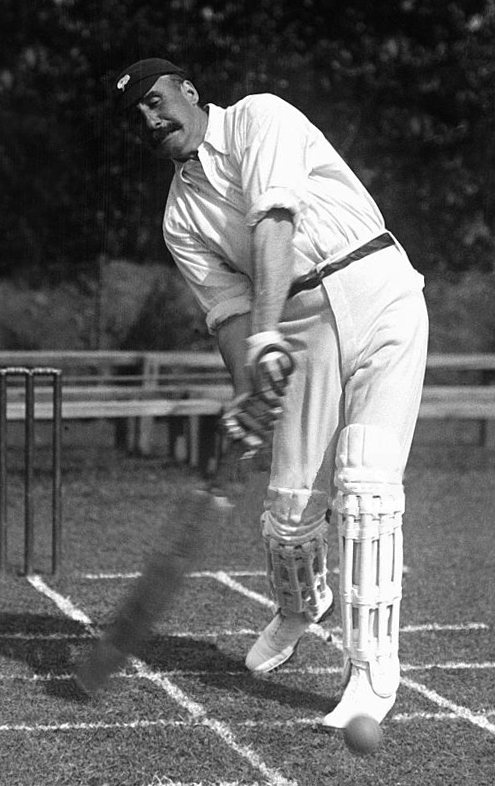
Lord Hawke c. 1905

Joseph Wolstinholm retired as club secretary after the 1902 season and was succeeded by Frederick Toone, who had previously been the secretary at Leicestershire. With Wolstinholm gone, Hawke had the county offices moved from Sheffield to the more central location of Leeds. Yorkshire, now completely under Hawke's influence, went on to claim two more titles under his captaincy in 1905 and 1908; in the latter season, they were unbeaten. What Swanton called "Yorkshire's abundance of reserves" was emphasised in 1905 when they won the title again despite contributing five of their best players to England in the Test series against Australia.

Hawke scored his last first-class century in 1904 for Yorkshire against Leicestershire with 100 not out. His batting faded after this and he managed only three further half-centuries in the rest of his career while his season average never again reached 20. He made a score of 61 not out for Yorkshire against Essex in 1907 and then 50 not out for Yorkshire against Gloucestershire in 1908.

1908 was Hawke's last full season as a player. He played only a few matches in 1909 and formally resigned as captain in 1910. He was succeeded by Everard Radcliffe, who held the post until the end of the 1911 season.

Hawke retired from his post as chairman of selectors in 1909 and, in the same year, he was named a Wisden "Cricketer of the Year" when the award was titled Lord Hawke and Four Cricketers of the Year. In the citation, Wisden said of Hawke that he "has won the affection and regard of his professionals without for a moment losing his authority". Although Hawke was an "absolute master", said Wisden, "he has always used his power wisely".

Hawke made his final first-class appearance for Yorkshire in a Scarborough Festival match against MCC at North Marine Road on 31 August to 2 September 1911. Playing under the captaincy of Archibald White, Hawke scored 20 and 8 not out in a tightly contested draw: at close of play on the final day, MCC were only 4 runs behind with 3 wickets standing.

== Overseas tours and Test career ==
Writing in 1899 during Hawke's career, W. G. Grace commented that Hawke "in various ways has materially assisted in extending the area of the cricket-playing world". E. W. Swanton wrote that Hawke "did much to foster a love of cricket in many parts of the world". Hawke saw himself as something of a cricketing missionary with a desire to develop the sport overseas. He became one of cricket's most prolific tourists, undertaking nine tours as a player between 1887–88 and 1911–12. These took him to Australia (1887–88), India and Ceylon (1889–90), North America (1891), India and Ceylon (1892–93), North America (1894), South Africa (1895–96), West Indies (1896–97), South Africa (1898–99) and Argentina (1911–12).

=== Australia: 1887–88 ===
Two English teams toured Australia in the winter of 1887–88. Wisden commented that "it is certain that such a piece of folly will never be perpetrated again" but the cause was rivalry between clubs in Melbourne and Sydney, who both wanted to promote an English team; and Wisden recorded that the Melbourne venture returned a significant loss of revenue. The team backed by the Sydney-based group was composed mainly of professionals under the management of Arthur Shrewsbury and called A. Shrewsbury's XI although it was captained on the field by one of its amateur members, usually C. Aubrey Smith. The other team, organised by George Vernon on commission by the Melbourne Cricket Club, was called G. F. Vernon's XI and its captain at the outset was the Hon. Martin B. Hawke.

Hawke played in three first-class matches against South Australia, Victoria and New South Wales. He had only moderate success, playing five innings in which he totalled 76 runs at 15.20 with a highest score of 48, and he held one catch. On Tuesday 6 December, at Richmond, New South Wales, Hawke received the news that his father had died and that he was now the 7th Baron Hawke of Towton. He relinquished the captaincy of the team to Walter Read and set sail for home.

=== India and Ceylon: 1889–90 and 1892–93 ===
Hawke toured India and Ceylon in the winter of 1889–90 as captain of an all-amateur team organised by George Vernon. It was the first time an English team had toured India but it played no first-class matches. Having played two matches in Ceylon, the team played eleven in India, including visits to Calcutta, Allahabad, Bombay and the Punjab.

In the winter of 1892–93, Hawke formed his own all-amateur team to tour Ceylon and India. It was a useful side that included future England Test players Stanley Jackson and Ledger Hill. They started with three matches in Ceylon in November 1892 that were not first-class. Moving to India, the team played twenty matches between November and March, including four that are recognised as first-class. One of these was a match at Allahabad against an All-India XI and, though Hawke did not play himself, his team won by an innings and 5 runs. In the three first-class matches that he took part in, Hawke had five innings, totalling exactly 100 runs with a highest score of 79; he held one catch.

=== North America: 1891–92 and 1894–95 ===
Hawke toured North America in 1891–92 and 1894. On the first tour, his team played a total of ten matches including two "fill up" games. Only two, both against a Gentlemen of Philadelphia XI, are currently rated first-class by CricketArchive. In these two games, Hawke had four innings and totalled 144 runs with a highest score of 74; he held two catches. On the second tour in September and October 1894, he played three first-class innings in matches against the same Philadelphia team and totalled 141 runs with a highest score of 78.

=== South Africa: 1895–96 and 1898–99 ===
Hawke led an England team to South Africa in 1895–96 which played three Test matches. This was the strongest touring team Hawke formed as it included C.B. Fry, George Lohmann, Sammy Woods and Tom Hayward. Hawke played in all four first-class matches on the tour, including the three Tests, but he totalled only 46 runs in his six innings with a highest score of 30; he held three catches.

Hawke toured South Africa again in 1898–99. This time, the team played five first-class matches, including two Tests which England won. The players included Johnny Tyldesley, Schofield Haigh, Albert Trott and Pelham Warner. Although Hawke was successful as a winning captain, his batting was poor with only 69 runs in eight innings, his top score being 31*.

=== West Indies: 1896–97 ===
Hawke toured the West Indies in 1896–97. He appeared in seven first-class matches but failed badly with the bat, totalling only 113 runs in nine innings with a top score of 26; he held three catches. The all-amateur team was not strong, its best known players being Hawke, Warner and H. D. G. Leveson-Gower.

=== Argentina: 1911–12 ===
In the early months of 1912, Hawke took an MCC team to Argentina where three matches against the national team were classified first-class and Hawke played in two of these. After that, Hawke made a couple of appearances for MCC in matches against minor counties, the last in June 1914.

=== Summary of Test career ===
Hawke played for England in five Test matches, all of them in South Africa: three in 1896 and two in 1899. Apart from his debut Test at St George's Oval, Port Elizabeth in February 1896, when England were led by Tim O'Brien, Hawke captained the team. He was always on the winning side. Although he was a successful Test captain, Hawke's contribution as an England batsman was modest. He scored only 55 runs in eight innings at an average of just 7.85 with a highest score of 30; and he held 3 catches.

== Administrative career ==
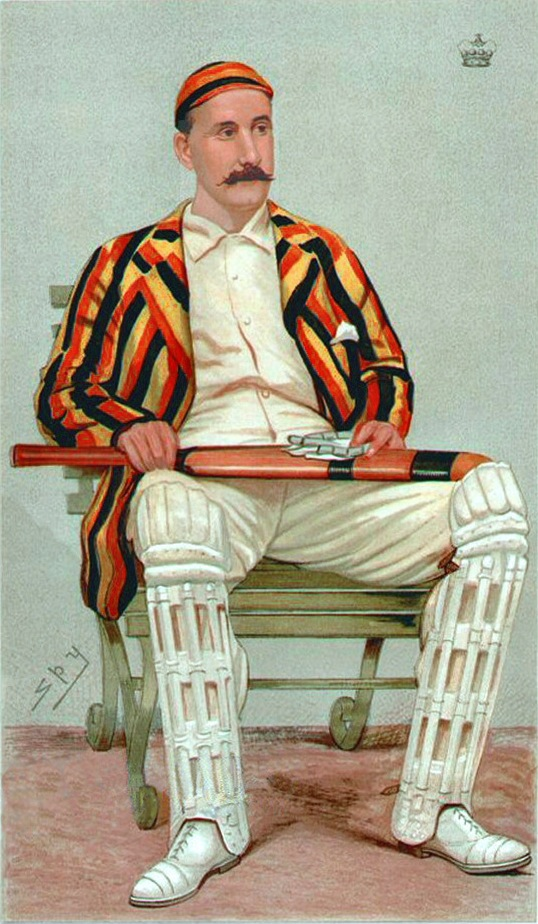
Caricature of Lord Hawke by "Spy" (Leslie Ward), first published in Vanity Fair on 24 September 1892 with the caption "Yorkshire Cricket".

Hawke's administrative career began in 1898 when, following the death of Michael Ellison, he was elected to succeed him as Yorkshire President and remained in office for forty years, in the first twelve of which he was also the Yorkshire team captain. He formed a successful liaison with Frederick Toone, who was club secretary from 1902 until his death in June 1930. Hawke praised Toone for increasing the membership from 3,000 in 1903 to over 7,000 ten years later. They worked together to further improve the terms and conditions of the professional players' contracts. To 1914, they were paid £5 for a home match and £6 for an away match with a £1 win bonus. Players who had received their county cap were obliged to join the Cricketers' Friendly Society and were paid the winter wage of £2 a week.

In 1898, Hawke publicly criticised England's selection system which was done by the appropriate ground authority ahead of the next Test match. Hawke advocated creation of a central selection committee and, soon afterwards, the MCC committee agreed with his proposal. Hawke himself was appointed chairman of the inaugural selection panel in 1899, although he was still playing for Yorkshire. He held the post until he retired in 1909, incorporating five Test series. He was reappointed in 1933 and served for one year.

In 1914, Hawke was appointed president of MCC, normally an annual position, but he was asked to remain in the post till the end of the First World War. As a result, Hawke was MCC president for five years from 1914 to 1918 inclusive and was succeeded in 1919 by the former Hampshire slow left-arm bowler Henry Forster, who shortly afterwards succeeded to the title of Lord Forster of Lepe. Throughout the war, Lord's was used for military purposes, including training and recreation. Problems frequently arose but, in Wisden's view, Hawke was "the greatest help in giving wise counsel towards their solution".

At the Yorkshire club's annual general meeting in 1925: Hawke made a famous statement that has often been both quoted and misquoted:

Pray God, no professional shall ever captain England. I love and admire them all, but we have always had an amateur skipper and when the day comes when we shall have no more amateurs captaining England it will be a thousand pities.

This outburst was in response to an article in the Weekly Dispatch newspaper by Lancashire off-spinner Cec Parkin, described by establishment figures as a "cricketing Bolshevik", in which Parkin argued that the professional Jack Hobbs should captain England instead of the establishment amateur Arthur Gilligan. It was an embarrassing incident which Pelham Warner, as editor of The Cricketer, did his best to explain away. Coldham maintains that what Hawke really meant to say was that it would be a pity if there was no amateur good enough to play for England. He excuses Hawke by asserting that he was accident-prone with "a talent for tripping himself up" by speaking too impulsively; and so "could behave like a complete ass in public".

In fact, Hawke was incorrect when he said England had "always had an amateur skipper". The convention of having an amateur captain effectively began with himself in the 1890s but, before that, England had been captained by James Lillywhite, Alfred Shaw and Arthur Shrewsbury: all professionals, but only on overseas tours, so it is possible that Hawke was referring to the captaincy in home Tests. Hawke did not live to see Len Hutton become the next professional England captain but he did see Wally Hammond, a former professional, turn amateur so that he could captain England, and Hawke reportedly supported Hammond's appointment.

Yet Hawke had a different view about the captaincy of Yorkshire as, in 1927, he advocated the appointment of the professional batsman Herbert Sutcliffe to the post. A controversy arose and Sutcliffe declined the offer with the result that William Worsley, another amateur, was appointed instead. Controversy was not Sutcliffe's only reason as he could see that a professional captain would not be given the freedom to lead the team as he wished. Sutcliffe had been very disappointed a few years earlier when Jack Hobbs had refused the England captaincy and he subsequently told Bill Bowes that "Lord Hawke lifted professional cricket from there to there", raising his hand from knee to shoulder height, "the professional cricketers lifted it to there", raising his hand above his head, "and even Lord Hawke always wanted it back again". Sutcliffe concluded by saying that Hobbs should have accepted the England captaincy for the sake of professional cricket.

Hawke succeeded Lord Harris as MCC Treasurer in 1932 and remained in both this post and the presidency of Yorkshire until his death in 1938. He soon faced criticism for his lack of response to calls from the Australian Board of Control about the "bodyline" controversy in the 1932–33 tour. Swanton said that Hawke, along with his right-hand man Sir Stanley Jackson, needed "a lot of convincing that the English tactics constituted a menace to the game which demanded action". In Swanton's view (1986), "Hawke's place in cricket history derives more from... (Yorkshire cricket and touring activities) ...than from any outstanding service to MCC as such". But Hawke as an administrator had considerable influence on events and Swanton also wrote that, though he was never among the great players, Hawke "must stand with Thomas Lord, William Clarke and W. G. Grace among influences on the development of the game". A contemporary view of Hawke's position in the game was expressed by Grace in his Reminiscences (1899) when he wrote that "Hawke still influences what I call the politics of the game".

In one of its tributes to Hawke, Wisden said:

Besides being a great cricketer in the highest sense of the word, (Hawke) was an administrator who not only aimed at the general welfare of the game, but sought to preserve in it an untarnished ethical code. To him cricket was more that [sic] a game. It was a philosophy that coloured his dealings with people and things.

In those dealings, Hawke was never comfortable as a public speaker and is said to have loathed making speeches. Coldham wrote that "his blunders on numerous public forums were to blight his declining years". The converse of this was that Hawke had personal charm and tact which were assets to him in small groups or with individuals.

== Style and personality ==
Hawke was a middle order batsman of reasonable quality who was generally considered good enough to play for the Gentlemen and may have under-achieved as a batsman, perhaps owing to the pressures of captaincy. He was noted for his on-side drive, which was his favourite stroke. His highest career score was the 166 which he scored for Yorkshire against Warwickshire at Edgbaston in 1896 when Yorkshire totalled a record 887 and he shared with Peel a record eighth wicket partnership of 292. Hawke took part in another record partnership in 1898 when he and David Hunter put on 148 for the tenth wicket against Kent. He played in 633 first-class matches and had 936 innings, including 105 in which he was not out, scoring 16,749 runs at an average of 20.15. He completed 13 centuries and 69 half-centuries.

As a fielder, Hawke generally took up position in the midfield or deep areas. Wisden editor Hubert Preston recalled Hawke's "speed and sure picking up" when fielding. Hawke held 209 catches in his first-class career. He was never a bowler and, in his entire first-class career, bowled just 5 four-ball overs, conceding 0–16 at nearly a run a ball.

Writing during Hawke's career, K. S. Ranjitsinhji in his Jubilee Book of Cricket (1897) describes Hawke as "a capital leader of men". The measure of his success as a captain was that Yorkshire under his leadership won the County Championship title 8 times. Hawke was an archetypal amateur gentleman playing at a time when professionals were generally viewed as second-class citizens but Hawke, who had great admiration for the professional cricketers in his charge was determined to improve their status and give them respectability. He insisted on discipline and neatness from his professionals and, in return, he gave them a financial stability they had formerly lacked. He instituted winter pay after the 1896 season, initially £2 per week, and established a merit system which resulted in payment of bonuses. In the longer term, he persuaded the club committee to retain and invest for the player two-thirds of his benefit money instead of handing him the whole amount to spend freely. Above all, wrote Swanton, he "deserves to be remembered for what he did for the pros". Hawke's financial policies were a great success at Yorkshire and his legacy was a general improvement in the finances and status of professional players everywhere as other counties followed his lead. W. G. Grace in his Reminiscences (1899) commented that Hawke "succeeded in introducing an esprit de corps and a standard of discipline, from the absence of which the county had been suffering". Grace added that Hawke "is a splendid captain, inspiring his men by the example he gives them of pluck and resource".

In a tribute to Hawke's captaincy policy, Stanley Jackson wrote:

A personal interest in each individual player and his welfare, which was then begun and lasted to the end, gained for "His Lordship" a respect and loyalty from every member of the team which I think must have been unique.

Jackson recalled that when Hawke began his career, Yorkshire had a "completely professional side including players whose names became famous in cricket history". Hawke soon realised that "such a team of fine natural cricketers, under sympathetic management and firm leadership, would develop into a most formidable and attractive county side". Jackson points out that:

This happened: public interest and support throughout Yorkshire followed and continued to increase until today the Yorkshire County Cricket Club with its fine county side, receives probably, the most generous and loyal support of any in the country. Hawke's initiative, with the co-operation of an enthusiastic and competent committee, laid the foundation of Yorkshire County Cricket upon which the present position has been built.

Although he was benevolent in his care of his players, Hawke would not tolerate any action that brought the game into disrepute or was perceived to be outside its "spirit". When Bobby Peel went out to play under the effects of too much alcohol, Hawke escorted him off the field and, as Peel himself sarcastically noted: "Lord Hawke put his arm round me and helped me off the ground – and out of first-class cricket. What a gentleman!" Hawke always carried himself as he thought a gentleman should and Bill Bowes, who first met him in 1928, recalled his "mannerism of pulling his shoulders back as he spoke, like a sergeant major in the Guards".

It has been said that cricket was Lord Hawke's life whereas to the more talented Jackson, for example, cricket was only his sport. In Birley's view, when Hawke joined Yorkshire as an Etonian who had come down from Cambridge, he was "prepared to make cricket the most serious thing – almost the only thing – he did with the rest of his life". Birley criticised Hawke as an "autocratic, opinionated, utterly self-confident sprig of the aristocracy" and as "a disciple" of his friend Lord Harris. In a later passage, Birley states that Hawke was "not as bright as his idol, Lord Harris, and so less skilful in concealing his ineffable self-satisfaction". In Hawke's autobiography, written in 1924, are comments like: "I believe I have done more than anyone else to raise the standard and self-respect of the splendid paid section of first-class cricketers" and Birley's view of the book is that it "must be one of the least modest works ever compiled".

Hawke had the reputation of being both a strict disciplinarian and a staunch traditionalist but, though he had his faults, he did care passionately about cricket and about the welfare of Yorkshire's professional players. "Cricket," he once wrote, "is a moral lesson in itself, and the classroom is God's air and sunshine. Foster it, my brothers, protect it from anything that will sully it, so that it will be in favour with all men". Wisden said that Hawke "always played to win", but whatever the game, he was "a generous opponent" and "never harbored resentment".

== Bibliography ==
- Altham, H. S. (1962). A History of Cricket, Volume 1 (to 1914). George Allen & Unwin.
- Birley, Derek (1999). A Social History of English Cricket. Aurum. ISBN 1-85410-710-0.
- Bowes, Bill (1949). Express Deliveries. London: Stanley Paul.
- Coldham, James P. (1990). Lord Hawke – A Cricketing Biography. The Crowood Press.
- Dyson, Paul & Pope, Mick (2001). 100 Greats – Yorkshire County Cricket Club. Tempus.
- Gibson, Alan (1989). The Cricket Captains of England. The Pavilion Library. ISBN 1-85145-390-3.
- Grace, W. G. (1899). W. G. – Cricketing Reminiscences. Hambledon Press.
- Guha, Ramachandra (2001). A Corner of a Foreign Field – An Indian History of a British Sport. Picador.
- Hawke, Lord (1932). "Fifty years of Yorkshire county". Wisden Cricketers' Almanack. John Wisden & Co.
- Hesilrige, Arthur G. M. (1921). Debrett's Peerage and Titles of courtesy. 160A, Fleet Street, London, UK: Dean & Son. p. 461.
- Hodgson, Derek (1989). The Official History of Yorkshire County Cricket Club. The Crowood Press. ISBN 1-85223-274-9.
- Kilburn, J. M. (1970). A History of Yorkshire Cricket. Stanley Paul. ISBN 0-09-101110-8.
- Ranjitsinhji, K. S. (1897). The Jubilee Book of Cricket. Blackwood.
- Swanton, E. W., ed. (1986). Barclays World of Cricket. Willow Books. ISBN 0-00-218193-2.
- Webber, Roy (1958). The County Cricket Championship. Sportsman's Book Club.
- Woodhouse, Anthony (1989). The History of Yorkshire County Cricket Club. London: Christopher Helm. ISBN 0-7470-3408-7.

Sporting positions
Preceded by Andrew Stoddart	English national cricket captain 1895–1896	Succeeded by W. G. Grace
Preceded by Andrew Stoddart	English national cricket captain 1898–1899	Succeeded by Archie MacLaren
Peerage of Great Britain
Preceded by Edward Hawke	Baron Hawke; 1887–1938	Succeeded by Edward Hawke
