= Winchester City Police =

Defunct police force

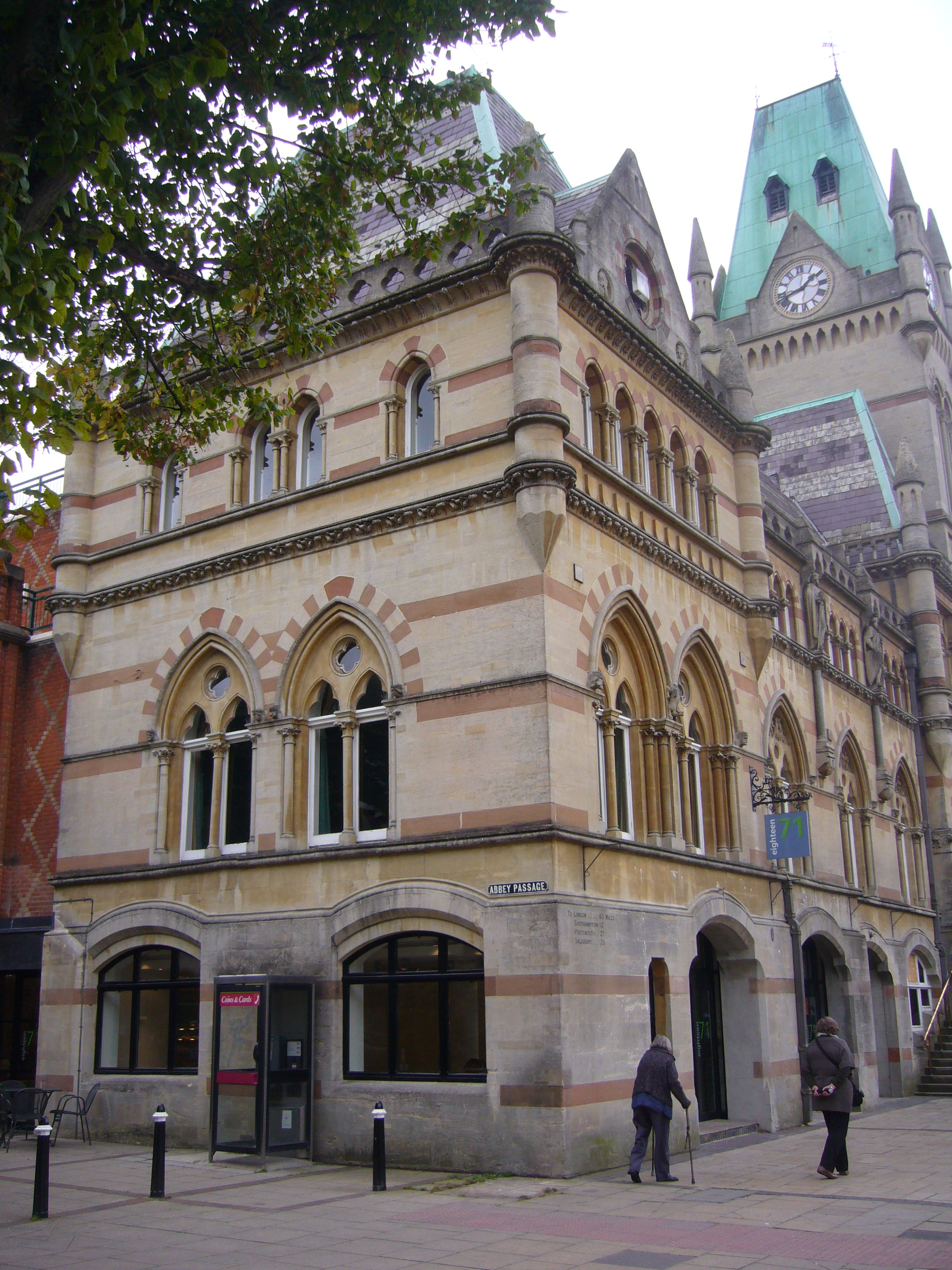
The Guildhall, Winchester. The old police station is now partly used as a cafe.

Winchester City Police was the police force of Winchester, Hampshire, England from 1832 to 1943.

The City of Winchester became the first place in Hampshire to set up a police force, four years before any other part of the county, and seven years before the county force was established at the end of 1839.

The force was established with an Inspector (Robert Buchanan) and seven constables on 28 July 1832. They were given an office in the Old Guildhall (now Lloyds Bank) to run the force.

The force nearly folded through lack of funds, but with the Municipal Corporations Act 1835, Winchester formed a Watch Committee and was able to secure funds to keep the police force. Funds were always a cause for concern for the Winchester police, when the Hampshire force was established, in 1839, the county council tried to incorporate the Winchester police, but the city watch committee always voted to keep an independent police force.

In 1873 Winchester built a new Guildhall which included a purpose-built police station with cells and barracks for the single officers. One of the constables wife's was paid to be the station cleaner, the single officers contributed to a fund for the cleaner to act as housekeeper for them. By this time the establishment of the force had more than doubled.

The new police station would serve Winchester well for almost 100 years until the 1960s.

== Amalgamation ==
With the Second World War well underway, the British government felt that the south coast would be best served by larger forces. Therefore, under the under the Defence (Amalgamation of Police Forces) Regulations 1942 (SR&O 1942/1443), the Home Office forced Winchester to join with Hampshire Constabulary. This was meant to be a temporary measure and Winchester would be able to split from Hampshire at the end of the war: nothing really changed with the running of the force, and the officers kept their rank and uniforms except for the Head Constable, who became a superintendent and answered to the Chief Constable of Hampshire instead of the Watch Committee of Winchester. However, the Police Act 1946 made the situation permanent, and by 1947 the city force was properly absorbed into the county force with the issue of Hampshire badges and insignia.

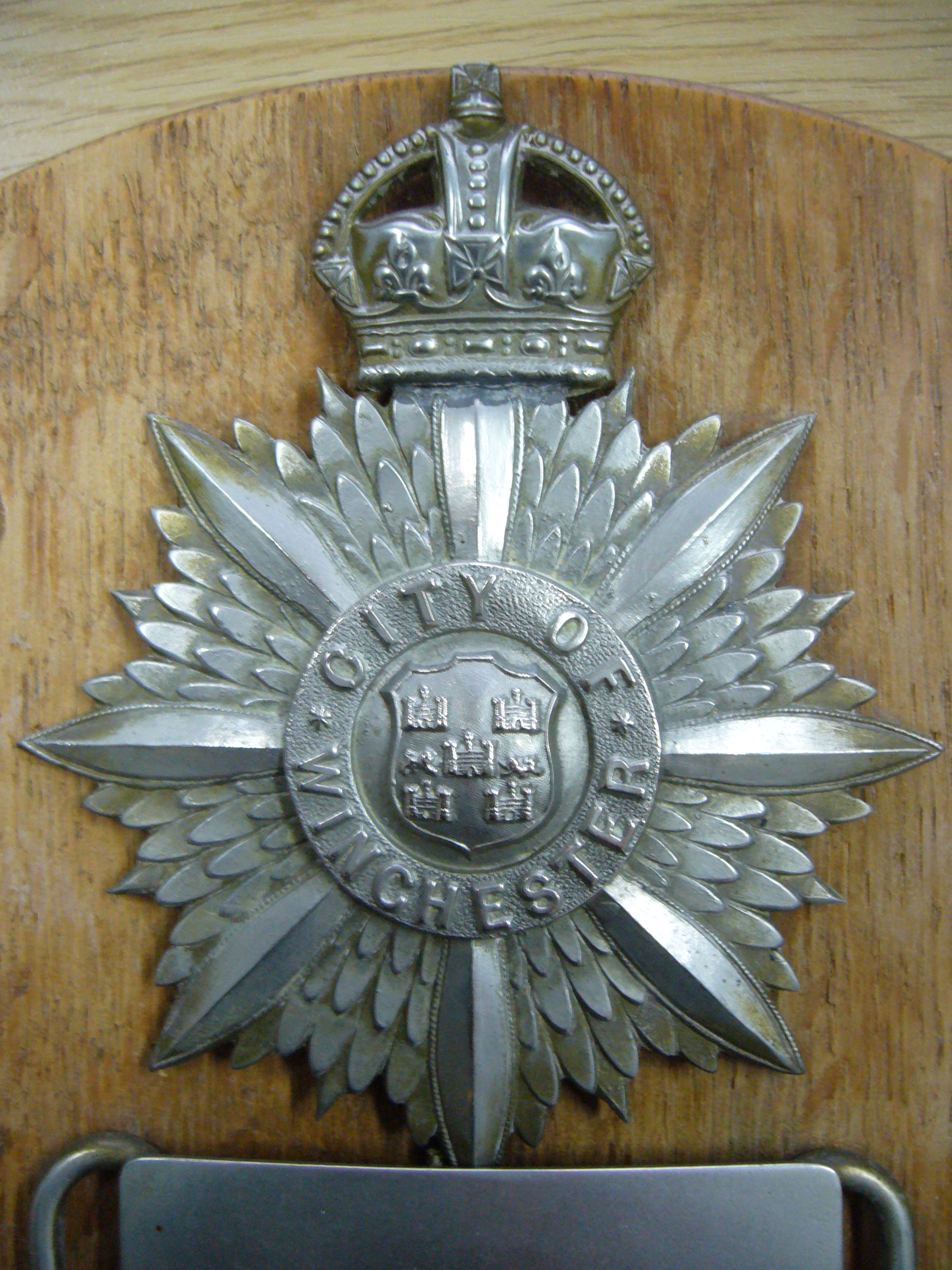
Winchester City Police helmet badge

== List of chief officers ==
- 1832 – Inspector Robert Buchanan (previously served in the Metropolitan Police)
- 1833 – William Shepherd (born 1802, Oxford) (previously served in the Metropolitan Police)
- 1851 – Superintendent Henry Hubbersty (born 1813, London) (previously served in the Metropolitan Police and Norfolk Constabulary)
- 1872 – Head Constable William Morton (born 1843, Westminster) (previously served in the Metropolitan Police)
- 1893 – Head Constable William George Felton (born 1856, Alresford) (joined the Winchester City Police in 1876)
- 1909 – Head Constable John Sim (born 1875) (previously served in the North Riding of Yorkshire Constabulary and Leeds City Police)
- 1924 – Head Constable William George Stratton (born 1882, Salisbury) (worked on the London and South Western Railway before joining Winchester City Police in 1900)
- 1942 – Head Constable Harry Reuben Miles (previously in Reigate Borough Police and as an inspector in Winchester from 1925)
