= John Duke (police officer) =

British police officer (1926–1989)

John Duke (20 October 1926 – 26 February 1989) was a senior British police officer who rose through the ranks to be Chief Constable of Hampshire Constabulary.

== Life ==
He was born in Newcastle-on-Tyne in the north-east of England and worked in the coal mines before going to London in 1947 to join the City of London Police. After 22 years with that force he transferred to Essex Constabulary as an Assistant Chief Constable, being promoted to Deputy Chief Constable there in 1972.

On 1 September 1977 he was appointed Chief Constable of Hampshire, where he oversaw the introduction of many changes, not least the introduction of the Air Support Unit and modern communication and training centres. He retired from the force in 1988.

== Honours and awards ==
- Queen's Police Medal (QPM)
- 1986 : Made Commander of the Order of the British Empire (CBE) in the 1986 Birthday Honours
- 1989: Deputy-Lieutenant for Hampshire

== Private life ==
He died in 1989 after surgery. He had married Glenys, with whom he had four daughters.

Police appointments
Preceded by Douglas Osmond	Chief Constable of Hampshire Constabulary; 1977 — 1988	Succeeded by Sir John Hoddinott
