= John Tew =

English cricketer, solicitor

Personal information
- Full name: John Edward Tew
- Born: 3 September 1905; Wigginton, Yorkshire, England
- Died: 28 December 1992 (aged 87); Ewshot, Hampshire, England
- Batting: Right-handed
- Relatives: Anthony Tew (brother); Lord Hawke (uncle)

Domestic team information
- Years: Team
- 1927: Oxford University
- 1928/29–1947/48: Europeans

Career statistics
Competition	First-class
Matches	11
Runs scored	348
Batting average	16.57
100s/50s	–/2
Top score	76
Catches/stumpings	9/–
- Source: ESPNcricinfo, 5 April 2020

John Edward Tew (3 September 1905 – 28 December 1992) was an English first-class cricketer and solicitor.

The son of E. W. Tew and his wife, Hon. Catherine Isabel Hawke (sister of Lord Hawke), he was born in September 1905 at Wigginton, Yorkshire. He was educated at Eton College, before going up to Magdalen College, Oxford. While studying at Oxford, he made a single appearance in first-class cricket for Oxford University against Leicestershire at Oxford in 1927. Batting twice in the match, he was dismissed in the Oxford first-innings for 4 runs by Alan Shipman, while in their second-innings he was dismissed by Alec Skelding for 9 runs.

After graduating from Oxford, he became a solicitor and moved to British India where he practised. He played first-class cricket while in India for the Europeans cricket team, mostly in the Bombay Pentangular, making his debut shortly after arriving in India in December 1928 against the Muslims. He played ten first-class matches for the Europeans up until January 1948, scoring 335 runs at an average of 17.63 and a high score of 76. He married the tennis player Barbara Drew in England at Alderley Edge in September 1935. Tew was an emergency commission in the British Indian Army during the Second World War in August 1942. He later returned to England, where he continued to work as a solicitor. Tew died in December 1992 at Ewshot, Hampshire. His brother, Anthony, also played first-class cricket.
