= Anthony Tew =

English cricketer, solicitor

Personal information
- Full name: Anthony Martin Tew
- Born: 24 August 1908; Wigginton, Yorkshire, England
- Died: 23 June 1987 (aged 78); Okus, Wiltshire, England
- Batting: Right-handed
- Bowling: Right-arm fast-medium
- Relatives: John Tew (brother); Lord Hawke (uncle)

Domestic team information
- Years: Team
- 1928: Oxford University

Career statistics
Competition	First-class
Matches	2
Runs scored	15
Batting average	5.00
100s/50s	–/–
Top score	15
Balls bowled	264
Wickets	3
Bowling average	73.66
5 wickets in innings	–
10 wickets in match	–
Best bowling	2/80
Catches/stumpings	1/–
- Source: Profile, espncricinfo.com, 5 April 2020

Anthony Martin Tew (24 August 1908 – 23 June 1987) was an English first-class cricketer and police officer.

The son of E. G. Tew and his wife, Hon. Catherine Isabel Hawke (sister of Lord Hawke), he was born in August 1908 at Wigginton, Yorkshire. He was educated at Winchester College, before going up to Magdalen College, Oxford. While studying at Oxford, he made two appearances in first-class cricket for Oxford University in 1928, against Kent and the touring West Indians at Oxford. He scored 5 runs in his two matches, in addition to taking 3 wickets.

After graduating from Oxford, he became a police officer. He served with Lincolnshire Constabulary, rising to the rank of inspector by 1946. He was appointed as chief constable of Shropshire Constabulary on 5 February 1946, however he resigned from the post just one day later for personal reasons and was succeeded by Douglas Osmond.

== Personal life ==
He married Suffolk artist Beryl Alice Matchwick in 1948. He continued to serve in the police, reaching the rank of superintendent for the Cleethorpes Division of Lincolnshire Constabulary. In his later years, he lived with his wife at Ramsbury near Marlborough. Tew died in June 1987, aged 78, at the Princess Margaret Hospital, Swindon. His brother, John, also played first-class cricket.
