= Hampshire and Isle of Wight Constabulary =

English territorial police force

Agency overview
- Formed: December 1839; 186 years ago
- Preceding agencies: Basingstoke Borough Police; Romsey Borough Police; Isle of Wight Constabulary; Southampton City Police; Portsmouth City Police; Winchester City Police
- Employees: 4,066
- Volunteers: 457
- Annual budget: £387 million (2021/22)

Jurisdictional structure
- Operations jurisdiction: Hampshire; Isle of Wight
- Map of police area
- Area: 1,613 sq miles
- Population: 1.99 million (2019/20)
- Legal jurisdiction: England & Wales
- Constituting instrument: Police Act 1996
- General nature: Local civilian police

Operational structure
- Overseen by: His Majesty's Inspectorate of Constabulary and Fire & Rescue Services; Independent Office for Police Conduct
- Headquarters: Eastleigh (strategic); Netley Abbey (support and training); Winchester (operational)
- Police officers: 3,022 (including 210 special constables) (September 2020)
- PCSOs: 214 (September 2020)
- Police and crime commissioner responsible: Donna Jones
- Agency executive: Alexis Boon, Chief Constable

Facilities
- Stations: 29 (14 open to the general public)
- Dogs: Yes

Website
- www.hampshire.police.uk

The Hampshire and Isle of Wight Constabulary is the territorial police force responsible for policing the counties of Hampshire and the Isle of Wight in South East England.

The force area includes Southampton, the largest city in South East England, and the naval city of Portsmouth. It also covers the New Forest National Park, sections of the South Downs National Park, large towns such as Basingstoke, Eastleigh, Andover, Fareham and Aldershot, and the historic city of Winchester. The constabulary, as it is currently constituted, dates from 1967, but modern policing in Hampshire can be traced back to 1832.

In late 2015, the force moved its strategic headquarters to Eastleigh, into a building now shared with Hampshire & Isle of Wight Fire and Rescue Service. At the same time, the force moved its Operational Headquarters to Mottisfont Court in Winchester. The Support & Training Headquarters and control room are located in Netley, near Southampton, in buildings of the former Netley Hospital.

== History ==
The first fully constituted police force formed in Hampshire was the Winchester City Police, founded in 1832. The Hampshire County Constabulary was established seven years later in December 1839 as a result of the passing of the County Police Act that year. Initially the force had a chief constable and two superintendents: one was based in Winchester, and the second based on the Isle of Wight (then part of Hampshire). The first separate police force on the island was formed in 1837 when the Newport Borough Police was established. A separate Isle of Wight Constabulary was not formed until 1890 when the island was the granted administrative county status.

During the 19th century, Hampshire County Constabulary absorbed various borough forces; including Basingstoke Borough Police (1836–1889), Romsey Borough Police (1836–1865), Lymington Borough Police (1836–1852) and Andover Borough Police (1836–1846). The Isle of Wight Constabulary likewise absorbed the borough forces of Newport and Ryde. Winchester, Southampton and Portsmouth continued to have independent police forces. In 1914 the Special Constabulary started to perform regular duties 'for the continuous preservation of order during the war'. Prior to this Special Constables were only called up to assist at major events and riots.

In 1943, as part of the Defence (Amalgamation of Police Forces) Regulations 1942, Hampshire County Constabulary was amalgamated with the Isle of Wight and Winchester City Police forces to form the Hampshire Joint Police Force. The two city forces, Southampton City Police and Portsmouth City Police, remained independent. Although this arrangement was originally intended only as a wartime measure, it continued after hostilities ended. In 1948, the merger was made permanent, with Hampshire Joint Police Force being renamed Hampshire Constabulary.

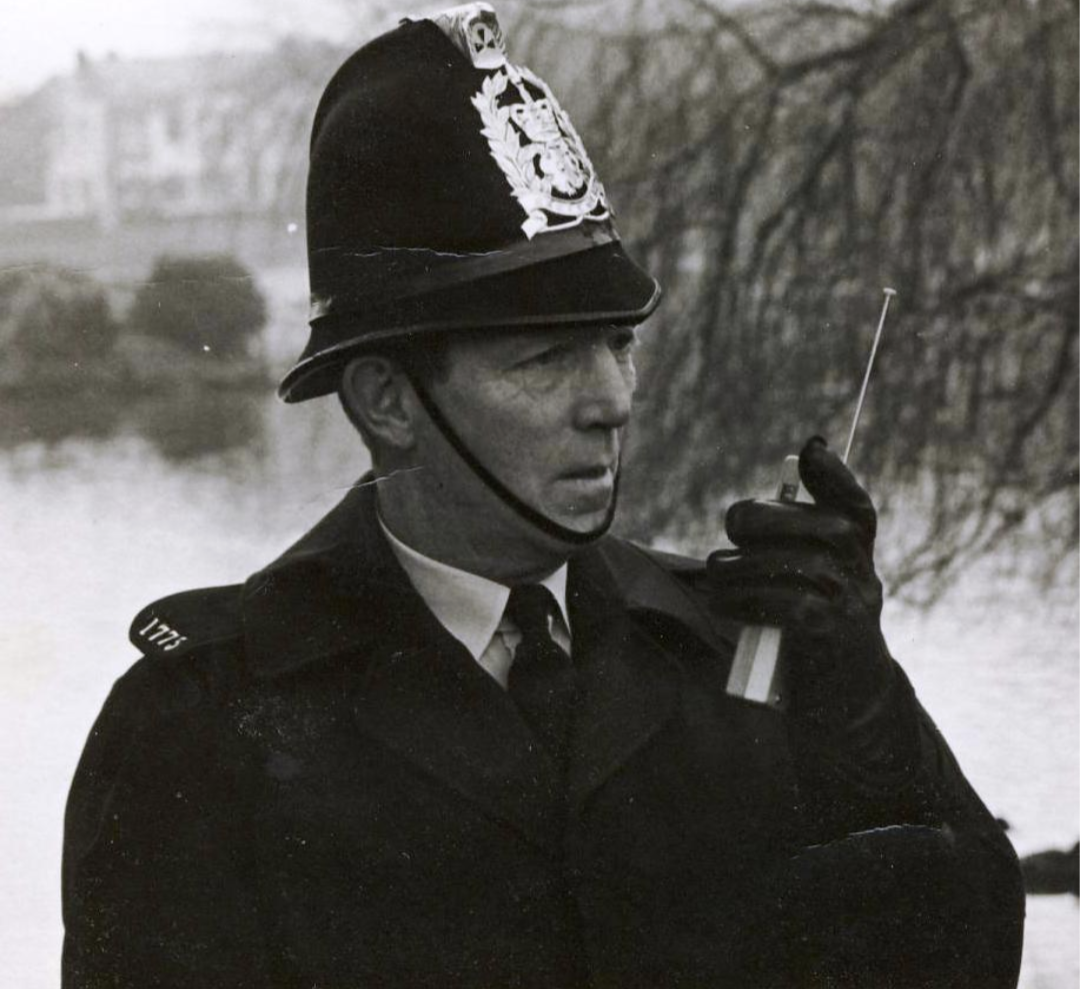
During the early 1970s Pye radios were issued to officers, one handset for transmission and the second for reception. These were the first personal radios were issued to officers by the force.

The name was changed once again in 1957, to Hampshire and Isle of Wight Constabulary. The Police Act 1964 led to the amalgamation of the city forces (Southampton and Portsmouth) into the Hampshire force. This created a force named Hampshire Constabulary. The last major changes to the police area were in 1974, when the Local Government Act changed a number of local government areas, and the responsibility for policing Christchurch was transferred to Dorset Police.

In November 2022, the force was renamed Hampshire & Isle of Wight Constabulary by Police and Crime Commissioner Donna Jones.

The names of forces that have policed the counties of Hampshire and the Isle of Wight since the nineteenth century are illustrated below:

In 1965, the force had an establishment of 1,346 and an actual strength of 1,137.

The headquarters moved to their current locations in Eastleigh (Strategic HQ) and Winchester (Operational HQ) in 2015. The previous facility in Winchester, close to Winchester Prison sat on the site of the first county headquarters, built in 1847.

Officers on a bicycle patrol in Cowes in 2012

Between 2013 and 2017, a number of police stations were closed and sold, while others had their public facilities closed. The need to reduce costs also led to the formation of a Joint Operations Unit with Thames Valley Police which, during the course of 2012, saw the amalgamation of Roads Policing Units, Training, Firearms and Dog Units of the two forces. The IT departments of the forces merged in early 2011. In April 2015, Hampshire Constabulary announced a "new-look policing model", beginning a major reorganisation.

=== Significant events ===
- 1893 – Chief Constable Peregrine Fellowes, a former Assistant Adjutant General of Australia, who had been in office for less than two years, is fatally injured in Romsey Road, Winchester – outside police headquarters – when, together with other officers, he attempts to stop a runaway horse and trap. Crushed against a wall he dies several days later from his injuries and is later buried in the Fellowes family plot at Westhill Cemetery, Winchester.
- 1914 – In Andover, the imprisonment of a mother and daughter sparks rioting involving crowds of up to two thousand people. Local officers seek the assistance of the fire brigade who are pelted with stones and retreat to their station. The arrival of mounted officers from Basingstoke fails to quell the disturbances and only after three days do extra officers drafted in from other stations bring the disorder to an end.
- 1915 – Southampton Police appoint two women police- they were not attested but served in uniform. Miss Annette Tate was one of them.
- 1929 – Hampshire Constabulary acquires its first motorised patrol vehicle – a BSA motorcycle combination.
- 1943 – Winchester City Police and Isle of Wight Constabulary forced to amalgamate with Hampshire as a war time measure. The amalgamation became permanent in 1947.
- 1944 – Women Inspector appointed: Miss P Yates.
- 1957 – On 1 April, the name of the force changed from Hampshire Constabulary to Hampshire and Isle of Wight Constabulary.
- 1970 – The Isle of Wight Festival takes place at Afton Down attracting huge crowds, estimates varying from five to six hundred thousand, who witness what would be the last UK performance by Jimi Hendrix – he is to die less than three weeks later. Despite the great numbers of people the atmosphere is relaxed and with only 500 officers to police the event the Chief Constable, Sir Douglas Osmond, dons casual clothes and sits with the crowds. He reports to the subsequent public enquiry that the press seem unhappy that it had been so peaceful.
- 1972 – A car bomb, containing approximately 130 kg of explosive, detonates outside the officer's mess at the 16th Parachute Brigade Headquarters in Aldershot. Seven civilians die and nineteen others are seriously injured. The Official Irish Republican Army claim responsibility for the blast the following day. A major criminal enquiry, led personally by Detective Chief Superintendent Cyril Holdaway, then head of the force's CID, succeeds in identifying the bombers and the three are sentenced at Winchester Crown Court later the same year.
- 1982 – Havant Policing Scheme, pioneered by then Chief Constable John Duke, emphasises the need for linking communication technology with beat officers.
- 1985 – The force aircraft, an Optica, crashes on the outskirts of Ringwood killing the crew – PC Gerry Spencer (pilot) and DC Malcolm Wiltshire (observer).
- 1987 – Introduction of tape recording of interviews with suspects to replace hand written interview notes. One of the first forces in the country to introduce tape recorded interviews. Rolled out across Hampshire over a year.
- 1988 – Introduction of new hand held PFX radio system with four control centres. Hampshire became the first force to leave the Home Office radio communications scheme.
- 2006 – On 15 May, Hampshire Constabulary launches the new single, non-emergency telephone number (SNEN), 101, as an alternative to 999. It is intended for reporting less serious or anti-social offences.
- 2011 – On 22 May, the force seeks assistance from Marwell Wildlife Park, near Winchester when it receives reports of the sighting of what is believed to be a white tiger seen in undergrowth in the Hedge End area of Southampton. The tiger turns out to be a life-size cuddly toy.
- 2014 – Hampshire Constabulary in international news after obtaining a European arrest warrant leading to the arrest in Spain of the parents of Ashya King (who had removed their seriously ill son from a Southampton hospital in order to get treatment abroad).
- 2017 – In September, the constabulary sent officers to the British Virgin Islands to help maintain law and order and assist with relief efforts following the devastation caused by Hurricane Irma.
- 2021 – In January, the constabulary dismissed five officers after secret recordings were made of racism and sexism in a crime unit at Basingstoke.
- 2021 – In February, the constabulary dismissed Chief Specials Officer Tom Haye for gross misconduct after he had used the term "pikey" in a private message to a 'friend'.
- 2025 – Chief Constable Scott Chilton retires with immediate effect, having been served notice he was under investigation by the Independent Office for Police Conduct (IOPC) into alleged gross misconduct. The investigation is into past relationships that Chilton had - one alleged to be with a junior officer and another said to have happened after he became Chief Constable in 2023.

=== Chief constables ===
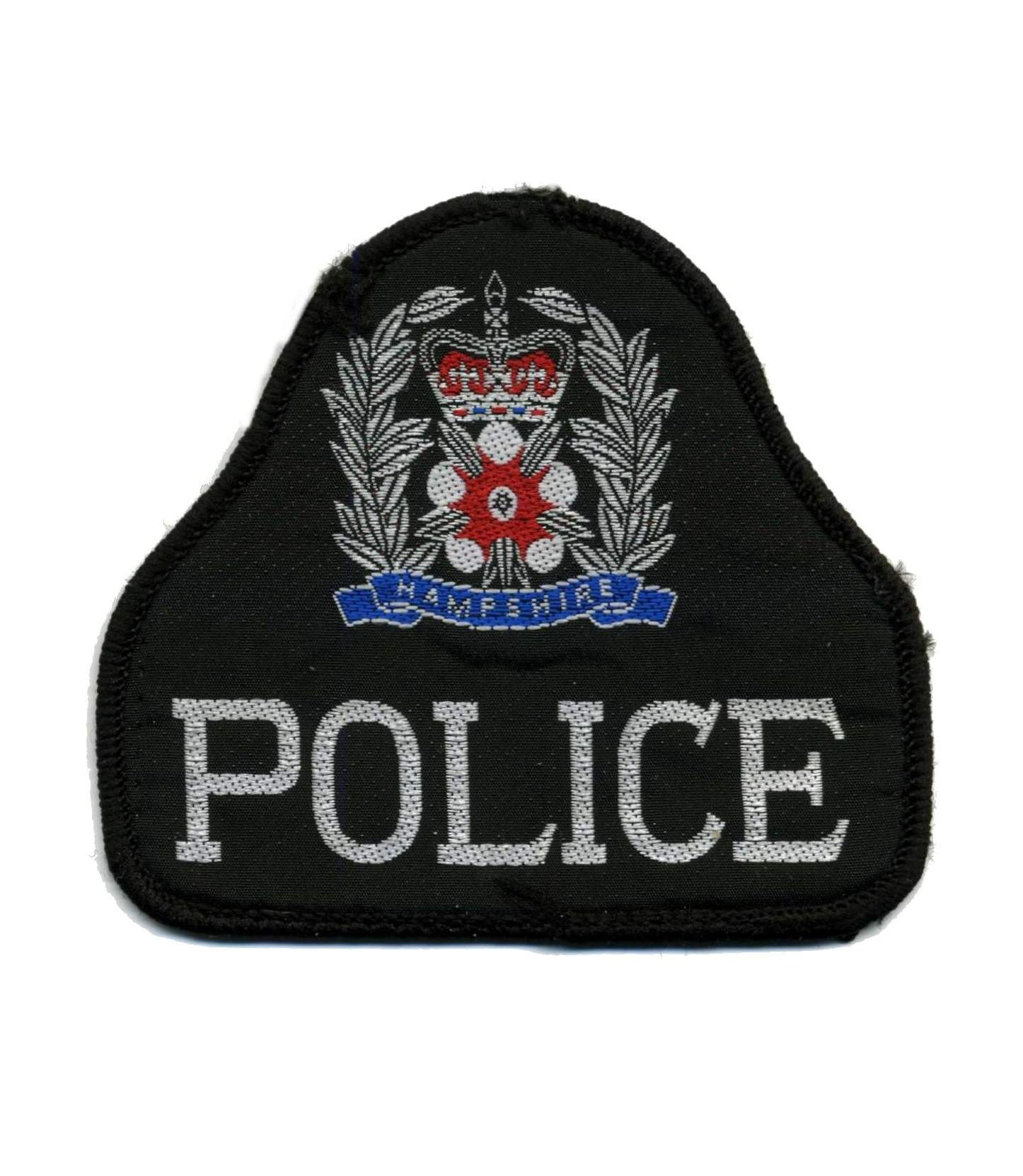
- Hampshire Constabulary Patch
  1839–1842: Captain George Robbins
- 1842–1856: Captain William C. Harris
- 1856–1891: Captain John Henry Forrest
- 1891–1893: Captain Peregrine Henry Thomas Fellowes (killed on duty)
- 1894–1928: Major St Andrew Bruce Warde
- 1928–1942: Major Ernest Radcliffe Cockburn
- 1942–1962: Sir Richard Dawnay Lemon
- 1962–1977: Sir Douglas Osmond
- 1977–1988: Sir John Duke
- 1988–1999: Sir John Hoddinott
- 1999–2008: Paul Kernaghan
- 2008–2013: Alex Marshall
- 2013–2016: Andy Marsh
- 2016–2023: Olivia Pinkney
- 2023–2025: Scott Chilton
- 2025–2025: Sam de Reya (Acting)
- 2025–present: Alexis Boon

== Governance ==
Toyota Corolla used by Hampshire and Isle of Wight Constabularly, parked in Portsmouth in 2025.

The chief constable is supported by a deputy chief constable and three assistant chief constables.

The force is overseen by an elected police and crime commissioner (PCC) on non-operational matters (i.e. budget and priorities). The current Hampshire and Isle of Wight PCC is Donna Jones, of the Conservative Party, who was re-elected in May 2024.

== Organisation and operations ==
Hampshire and Isle of Wight Constabulary is led by a chief constable, supported by a deputy chief constable, assistant chief constables and police staff chief officers. The force's operational leadership is organised around senior officer portfolios, including Local Policing, Crime and Criminal Justice, Joint Operations, and Public Service, Culture and Legitimacy.

The current structure supersedes the earlier 2016 "strands" model, under which the force described its operational functions as Intelligence, Tasking and Development, Prevention and Neighbourhoods, Response and Patrol, and Investigations. Current public force material instead describes the main senior leadership portfolios by function, including Local Policing, Crime and Criminal Justice, and Joint Operations.

=== Chief officer group ===
The constabulary is led by the chief constable, who is supported by a deputy chief constable, assistant chief constables and police staff chief officers. The senior leadership team includes officers and staff with responsibility for operational policing, crime and criminal justice, joint operations, public service and legitimacy, people, finance, information, strategy and corporate services.

The force states that its senior leadership team is responsible for leading policing services across Hampshire and the Isle of Wight, working with communities, partner agencies and regional and national criminal justice partners.

=== Local Policing ===
Local Policing is responsible for neighbourhood policing, local crime investigation and emergency response teams across Hampshire and the Isle of Wight. It is led at senior level by the assistant chief constable for Local Policing, who is also responsible for executive-level relationships with local authorities and other emergency services, the force's use of police powers, serious violence reduction and rural policing matters.

Local Policing is delivered through a layered geographical model. Force-wide local policing capabilities support priorities such as rural crime, serious violence and strategic area policing. Area-based teams operate across wider policing areas, while district-based teams provide neighbourhood policing, response and patrol, local investigation, offender targeting and partnership problem solving.

The constabulary is split into four local policing areas: Western, Eastern, Northern and the Isle of Wight. Within those areas, district teams provide local delivery. This includes District Policing Teams, District Neighbourhood Policing Teams, local CID, Priority Crime Teams, Neighbourhood Policing Teams and other local prevention and problem-solving functions.

==== Local policing areas ====
The constabulary's local policing structure is based around four areas: Western, Eastern, Northern and the Isle of Wight. Local commanders lead day-to-day policing activity in neighbourhoods across Hampshire and the Isle of Wight.

The Western, Northern and Eastern areas each have an area command structure consisting of an area commander, area superintendents, district commanders and reactive and proactive CID leadership. The Isle of Wight area has a smaller command structure, with an area commander, district commander and local CID leadership.

This area-based model replaced an earlier functional model. In 2023, the force moved volume crime investigation back into local policing, including response and neighbourhood teams, so that local officers had stronger ownership of investigations within their areas and districts.

==== Prevention and Neighbourhoods ====
Prevention and neighbourhood policing covers visible community policing, neighbourhood engagement, local priority-setting, partnership working, problem solving and the prevention of crime and anti-social behaviour.

Neighbourhood Policing Teams provide local community policing within districts and neighbourhoods. They work with communities and partners to identify local issues, gather intelligence, support public confidence and prevent crime and anti-social behaviour. The Local Bobbies scheme forms part of this approach, with named neighbourhood officers dedicated to local areas. Local Bobbies identify threat, harm and risk, tackle local issues, investigate local crimes, collect intelligence and work with partner agencies to identify problem-solving approaches.

Police community support officers and neighbourhood officers contribute to local visibility, community engagement and intelligence gathering. PCSOs are problem solvers and intelligence gatherers who support communities and warranted officers.

Prevention and neighbourhood policing also includes work with young people and partner agencies. The Office of the Police and Crime Commissioner operates a Youth Commission, which enables young people across Hampshire and the Isle of Wight to support, challenge and voice young people's opinions on crime and policing issues.

At district level, prevention and neighbourhood teams contribute to local problem solving, crime prevention, community engagement and local investigation activity, working alongside response teams, local CID and proactive policing teams.

==== Response and Patrol ====
Response and Patrol provides the frontline response to emergency and priority incidents across the force area. The Local Policing portfolio includes emergency response teams as part of its current senior leadership responsibilities.

Under the previous functional model (pre-2023), Response and Patrol was described as having two roles: responding to emergency incidents and being tasked by district commanders to proactively patrol problem issues. The same material linked this approach to maintaining strong 999 response capability while retaining local problem-solving and visible patrol activity.

Response and Patrol comprise the following teams that sit within it:

- District Policing Teams provide local frontline response. Response officers attend emergency and non-emergency incidents, progressing existing jobs and undertaking proactive work such as patrols, stop searches and warrants.
- District Neighbourhood Policing Teams support local response and investigation work. DNPT officers as work alongside District Policing Team colleagues, dealing with detainees in custody, conducting interviews, completing outstanding enquiries, managing remands and supporting DPT resourcing when required.

Response and Patrol teams are supported by Contact Management, which receives public contact and supports the deployment of officers and staff to incidents. Contact Management sits within the Joint Operations portfolio rather than within Local Policing.

==== Local Crime Investigation ====
District Criminal Investigation Departments sit within Local Policing. The force describes Local Policing as including local crime investigation as well as neighbourhood policing and emergency response teams.

In 2023, the force changed from a functional model to an area-based model, moving volume crime investigations out of central hubs and back into local policing, including response and neighbourhood teams. OPCC reporting stated that around 1,000 officers received uplift training in investigation skills, including early investigative enquiries, investigative mindset, reasonable and proportionate lines of enquiry, disclosure and case file preparation.

Local investigation work includes the investigation of crimes owned and progressed within districts and local policing areas. It is distinct from specialist crime, public protection, intelligence, custody and wider criminal justice functions, which sit within the Crime and Criminal Justice portfolio.

Detectives as work within teams investigating serious and complex crime, progressing investigations, requesting forensic analysis, preparing court material, liaising with witnesses and interviewing suspects.

==== Force-wide, area and district teams ====
Local Policing uses force-wide, area-based and district-based teams to tackle neighbourhood crime, repeat offenders and local harm. Neighbourhood crime is reviewed through district performance meetings and area performance processes, with district priorities being set where series, repeat victims, offenders or locations are identified.

- Area Crime Teams and Neighbourhood Enforcement Teams operate at area level, supporting districts where offending, harm or crime patterns cross local boundaries. Area Crime Teams respond to burglaries and target those responsible for series crime, while Neighbourhood Enforcement Teams support enforcement against prolific offenders and gather intelligence to support policing operations.
- Priority Crime Teams operate at district level and focus on local priority crime, repeat offenders and high-harm offending. Hampshire and Isle of Wight Constabulary has described Basingstoke Priority Crime Team as focusing on offenders and harm linked to drug-related harm, child sexual and criminal exploitation, domestic abuse and most serious violence.

Local enforcement activity may involve several local policing teams working together. In March 2024, Hampshire and Isle of Wight Constabulary said Portsmouth Area Crime Team worked with CID, neighbourhood officers, response officers, the Road Policing Unit's Proactive Team, the Licensing Team, Probation and Southampton City Council during Operation Blue Island, a day of intensified enforcement activity in Portsmouth.

==== Rural crime and serious violence ====
Rural policing and serious violence reduction sit within Local Policing at senior leadership level.

The constabulary operates the Country Watch Rural Crime Task Force to target serious and organised criminals affecting rural communities. The force and Police and Crime Commissioner announced in 2025 that the task force would focus on rural crime issues including machinery theft, hare coursing, poaching, fishing offences and fly-tipping.

The force also operates a Violent Crime Taskforce. Police and Crime Commissioner reporting states that the taskforce was created using GRIP funding, with an inspector, sergeant, ten constables and two analysts working across the force and alongside the Violence Reduction Unit. The reporting describes the taskforce as focusing on violent crime hotspots, repeat perpetrators and problem-solving approaches to victims, offenders and locations.

=== Crime and Criminal Justice ===
Crime and Criminal Justice is responsible for investigations, custody, intelligence, public protection and safeguarding, as well as the wider criminal justice system. The assistant chief constable for Crime and Criminal Justice is also responsible for relationships with regional and national criminal justice partners, including the Crown Prosecution Service, HM Prison Service, National Probation Service and the judiciary.

This portfolio is separate from Local Policing. Local Policing includes neighbourhood policing, local crime investigation and emergency response teams, while Crime and Criminal Justice covers specialist investigation, intelligence, public protection, custody, forensic services and criminal justice functions.

Detectives may later transfer into specialist departments including Amberstone, Major Crime, the Serious and Organised Crime Unit, Child Abuse, Financial Crime, Cyber Crime and Intelligence.

==== Specialist Crime Command ====
The Specialist Crime Command deals with serious, complex and specialist investigations that require dedicated investigative capability beyond routine local policing. Police staff investigator recruitment material places PIP level 2 specialist crime investigation roles within Specialist Crime Command.

Detective work can include serious and complex investigations, progressing existing investigations, requesting forensic analysis, preparing court material, liaising with witnesses and interviewing suspects. It lists offences investigated by detectives as including serious assaults, homicide, drug supply, serious sexual offences, sudden and unexpected deaths on behalf of the coroner, firearms offences and serious domestic abuse.

Specialist crime functions include investigation of high-harm and complex offences, support to major investigations, specialist victim-focused investigation and the development of investigative capability across the force. Some specialist crime areas operate across the wider force area rather than being limited to individual districts.

==== Major Crime & Amberstone ====
Major Crime provides capability for the investigation of the most serious offences, including homicide and other complex investigations. Major Crime is one of the specialist departments into which detectives may transfer.

The Major Crime Department (MCD) owns all confirmed murder cases within the constabulary, as well as other homicide investigations where specified conditions are met. Other homicides, such as manslaughter, may be investigated by CID with oversight from an accredited Senior Investigating Officer. The Major Crime Department is based from three areas - East, West and North. MCD maintains oversight of homicide data accuracy and uses a surge model, with a core group of trained staff supplemented by wider force resources to meet demand.

Amberstone is the force's rape and serious sexual offences investigation specialism. Officers in Amberstone work alongside the:

- Serious and Organised Crime Unit (SOCU)
- Child Abuse Investigation Team (CAIT)
- Financial Crime Unit (FCU)
- Cyber Crime Unit (CCU)
- Intelligence Directorate.

Specialist investigation functions support victims, gather evidence, manage complex enquiries, prepare case material and work with criminal justice partners. These functions are distinct from local crime investigation, which sits within Local Policing.=

==== Intelligence, Serious and Organised Crime Command ====
Intelligence, Serious and Organised Crime Command supports the identification, disruption and investigation of organised criminality, high-harm offenders and crime networks. The Crime and Criminal Justice portfolio includes responsibility for intelligence as well as investigations, public protection and safeguarding.

The command was referred to publicly in 2024 after HMICFRS found that the force needed to improve its response to serious and organised crime. The force stated that it had created a specialised Intelligence and Serious and Organised Crime Command and secured investment to enhance intelligence capability.

The Serious and Organised Crime Unit is one of the specialist departments identified in Hampshire and Isle of Wight Constabulary detective recruitment material. Intelligence functions support both specialist investigations and local policing by developing information about offenders, locations, crime patterns and threats.

Covert operations capability sits within Intelligence and Serious and Organised Crime. A Covert Operations Detective Inspector role profile places the role within Intelligence and Serious and Organised Crime and describes it as managing intelligence teams, providing oversight of covert capabilities and supervising the Hampshire Surveillance Unit, Complex Investigation Support Unit and Operational Security Advisor.

Hampshire and Isle of Wight Constabulary also works with regional and national partners on serious and organised crime, county lines and drug supply investigations, including joint operations with other forces and national agencies.

==== Public Protection and Safeguarding ====
Public protection and safeguarding sit within the Crime and Criminal Justice portfolio.

Public protection work includes safeguarding vulnerable people and investigating offences involving vulnerability, risk and harm. Historic Hampshire Constabulary public protection material described the department as investigating child abuse and vulnerable adult abuse, safeguarding vulnerable people, and working with partner agencies to manage offenders through multi-agency public protection arrangements.

Offender management forms part of the public protection environment, including work connected to multi-agency public protection arrangements. Public protection and safeguarding functions work with local policing, specialist investigation teams, criminal justice partners, local authorities and other agencies where risk, vulnerability or safeguarding concerns are identified.

Child abuse investigation and internet child abuse work form part of the force's specialist safeguarding and public protection capability. Detective recruitment material identifies Child Abuse as one of the specialist departments into which detectives may transfer.

Police and Crime Commissioner reporting states that Major Crime and the Child Abuse Investigation Team are co-located in the constabulary's three mainland bases, covering North, East and West. The reporting states that CAIT covers attendance at all child deaths 24/7, with homicide ownership passing to Major Crime where homicide is suspected beyond specified circumstances.

==== Cyber and economic crime ====
Cyber crime and financial crime are identified by Hampshire and Isle of Wight Constabulary as specialist detective departments.

Cyber crime capability supports investigations involving digital offending, online harm and technology-enabled criminality. Financial and economic crime capability supports investigations into fraud, money laundering, financial offending and other offences involving financial evidence or criminal benefit.

These functions support both specialist investigations and wider force activity, including local policing investigations where cyber, digital or financial evidence is relevant.

==== Criminal Justice and Custody ====
Criminal justice and custody functions sit within the Crime and Criminal Justice portfolio. The senior leadership page identifies custody and the wider criminal justice system as part of the Crime and Criminal Justice assistant chief constable's responsibilities.

Custody and criminal justice functions include the handling of detained persons, case progression, court files, charging processes and liaison with criminal justice partners. The portfolio maintains relationships with the Crown Prosecution Service, HM Prison Service, the National Probation Service and the judiciary.

Recruitment material for the Custody Investigation Team describes the role as dealing with early investigation, interviews of arrested persons, out-of-custody disposals, court files, charging decisions, bail and remand work.

A Criminal Justice Unit role profile published by the force places case administration and support roles within the Criminal Justice Unit.

==== Forensic Services ====
Forensic Services supports investigations through the recovery, examination, interpretation and reporting of forensic evidence. The force's Head of Forensic Services role profile places the Head of Forensic Services within Forensic Services and describes the post as responsible for leading forensic service delivery across the force.

Forensic services include biometrics and fingerprint examination. A Non-Reporting Fingerprint Examiner role profile places the Fingerprint Bureau within Forensic Services – Biometrics, Criminal Justice Command. The role involves analysing, comparing and evaluating finger, palm and foot impressions recovered from crime scenes or exhibits, using the national automated fingerprint identification system Ident1 and supporting investigations and criminal justice processes through evidential reporting.

Forensic Services also includes forensic imagery. A role profile for an Imaging Technician (Forensic Imagery) describes the role as reporting to an Imaging Unit Supervisor and undertaking the capture, processing and retrieval of imagery from different sources, including CCTV, image enhancement, 360 laser scanning, 3D body maps and electronic court presentations.

In 2023, the constabulary said its Imaging Unit created a digital model from CT scan data in a murder case, enabling a 3D-printed skull to be used as evidence in court. The force said the work was initiated by one of its Imaging Technicians and supported the presentation of complex medical and forensic evidence to the jury.

Forensic collision investigation is now part of the forensic services environment rather than the Joint Operations Unit. The Chief Constable's 2023/24 Statement of Accounts states that the Forensic Collision Investigation Unit was moved out of the JOU and into the Scientific Services Department due to accreditation requirements, and that the constabulary is part of the national Forensic Collision Investigation Network.

Historic Hampshire Constabulary material described Scientific Services as providing specialist forensic support across the force, including forensic crime scene examination, fingerprints, photographic and video services, chemical treatment, forensic resource management and imaging.

Forensic support is used by local policing teams and specialist investigators, but sits outside routine local policing delivery.

=== Joint Operations ===
Joint Operations is the portfolio responsible for all contact centres and the Joint Operations Unit. The senior leadership page states that the portfolio includes roads policing, armed response, public order, marine and mounted teams across Hampshire, the Isle of Wight and Thames Valley.

The Joint Operations portfolio includes both Contact Management and the collaborated Joint Operations Unit. Contact Management supports public contact and incident management, while the Joint Operations Unit provides specialist operational capability across the Hampshire, Isle of Wight and Thames Valley force areas.

==== Contact Management ====
Contact Management is responsible for public contact and incident management functions. It includes the force's contact centres and control room activity, supporting the assessment of calls, online reports and incidents before officers and staff are deployed.

Although Contact Management supports Local Policing, it sits within the Joint Operations portfolio rather than within Local Policing. Hampshire and Isle of Wight Constabulary's contact material states that online reports are reviewed by the same team that answers calls in the control room.

Contact Management functions include contact centre handling, triage of public reports and police control room activity. These functions support the deployment of local policing and specialist resources but are organisationally distinct from District Policing Teams.

==== Joint Operations Unit ====
The Joint Operations Unit is a collaborated specialist unit between Hampshire and Isle of Wight Constabulary and Thames Valley Police. Thames Valley Police states that the two forces have shared the JOU since 2011 and that it includes roads policing, firearms capability, operational support, dogs, mounted policing for Thames Valley and marine policing for Hampshire.

The unit provides specialist operational support across Hampshire, the Isle of Wight and Thames Valley. Its current public description includes roads policing, armed response, public order, marine and mounted teams.

The JOU is separate from regional collaborations such as Counter Terrorism Policing South East and the South East Regional Organised Crime Unit, which operate across wider regional force groupings.

A Volvo XC90 used by JOU Roads Policing, seen at Fawley Emergency Services Day in 2026.

==== JOU Roads Policing ====
Roads policing is delivered through the Joint Operations Unit. It provides specialist policing of the road network across Hampshire, the Isle of Wight and Thames Valley, supporting road safety, enforcement, emergency response on the roads and the disruption of criminal use of the road network.

Roads policing capability includes response to serious road incidents, proactive roads policing, tasking activity, commercial vehicle enforcement, motorcycle enforcement and road safety work. Earlier collaboration material described roads policing as one of the specialist functions delivered jointly across departmental and geographical boundaries by Hampshire and Thames Valley Police.

==== JOU Tactical Firearms ====
Armed response is delivered through the Joint Operations Unit. Firearms officers provide specialist capability for incidents involving firearms or other serious threats where armed deployment is required.

Thames Valley Police describes JOU Firearms as a jointly resourced unit from Hampshire Constabulary and Thames Valley Police, including Armed Response Vehicles and the Protection Group. It states that the Armed Response Vehicle Department provides capability to respond to spontaneous firearms incidents and planned operations across the two force areas.

Hampshire and Isle of Wight Constabulary recruitment material describes the primary role of armed response vehicles as providing a 24-hour spontaneous response to firearms incidents and other incidents where threat, harm or risk requires the deployment of armed assets.

The force also has hostage and crisis negotiator capability. Hampshire and Isle of Wight Constabulary recruitment material describes negotiators as assisting in incidents such as sieges, kidnaps, missing people, firearms incidents and people in crisis, working alongside specialist assets including firearms, public order and surveillance.

==== JOU Operations ====
JOU Operations is referred to in Hampshire and Isle of Wight Constabulary's response to HMICFRS's inspection of the police response to the public disorder in July and August 2024. The response stated that the force's response to Operation Navette was coordinated within the Joint Operations Unit, and later referred to regular engagement with internal colleagues in "JOU Operations" and external partners in the National Police Coordination Centre Strategic Intelligence Briefing team through 24/7 Intelligence and the Force Intelligence Bureau.

The Joint Operations Unit includes several named specialist units. The Police and Crime Plan states that the Roads Policing Unit, Dog Support Unit, Public Order Unit, Armed Response Unit and Marine Support Unit are part of the JOU with Thames Valley Police. Thames Valley Police also states that the shared JOU includes operational support, dogs, mounted policing for Thames Valley and marine policing for Hampshire.

The Marine Support Unit supports operations on and around coastal and inland waters, ports and maritime environments. The TVP Mounted Section supports public order, public safety, visibility and search-related activity where mounted officers provide an operational advantage.

The Dog Support Unit and Specialist Search Unit also supports officers across Hampshire, the Isle of Wight and Thames Valley. Hampshire and Isle of Wight Constabulary recruitment material describes the Dog Support Unit as providing a specialist resource to officers in Hampshire and Isle of Wight and Thames Valley, with dogs used to prevent and detect crime, find missing people and locate stolen or illegal property.

== Uniform, equipment and vehicles ==
Police officers wear operational and formal dress uniforms similar to other police forces in the United Kingdom.

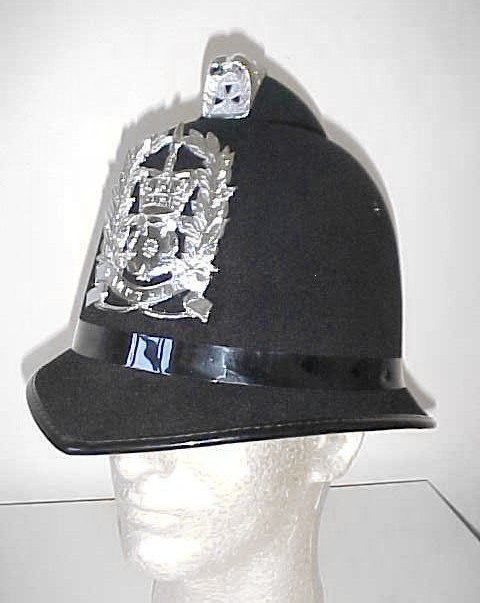
Helmet - Constable

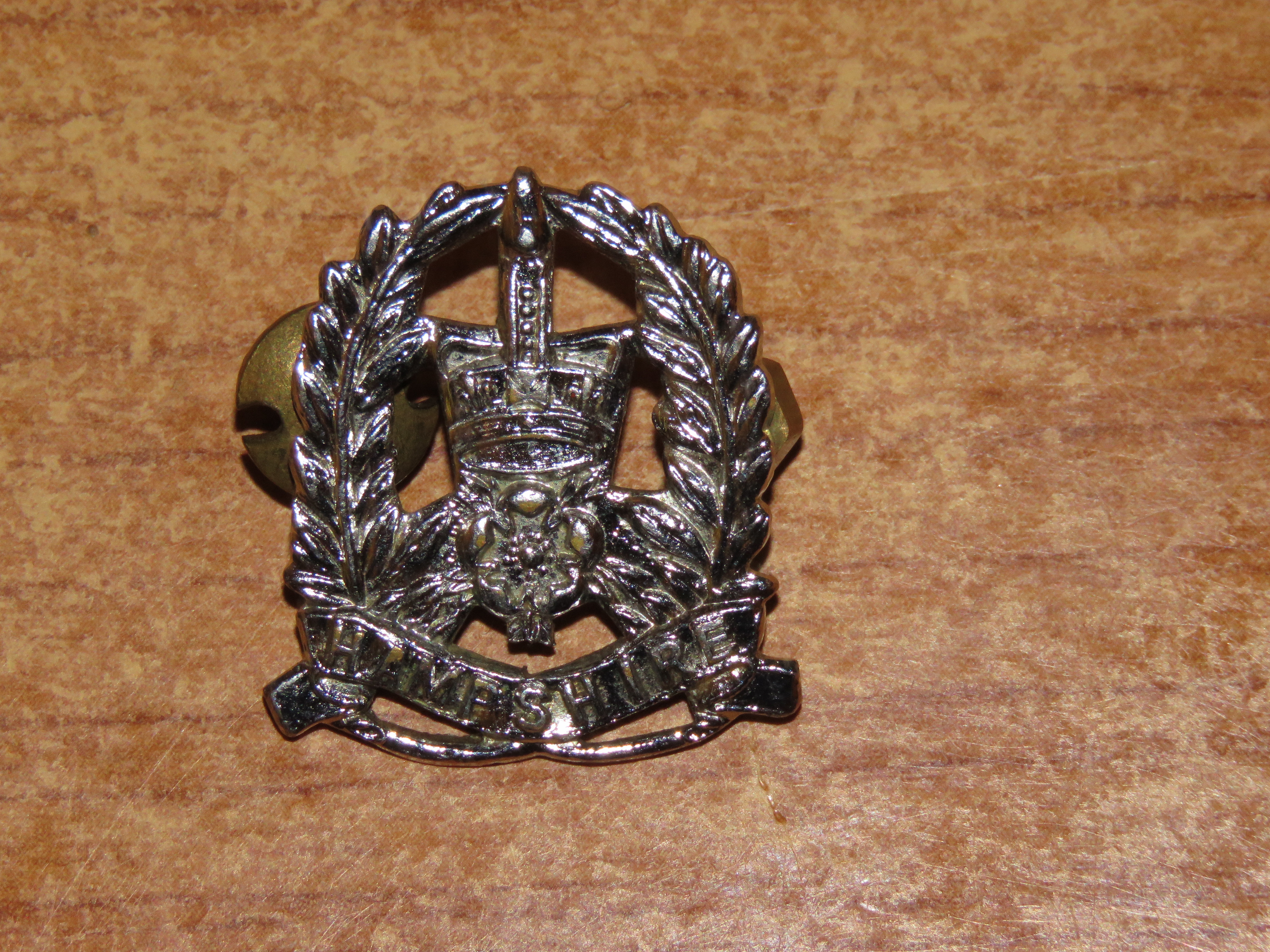
Hampshire Constabulary lapel badge (circa 1978). Detail of the Hampshire Rose and St Edward's Crown.

When on duty, frontline police officers wear a black, wicking T-shirt with the word 'Police' on the sleeves, and black uniform trousers. Hampshire officers no longer use the traditional police jumper, having favoured a black fleece with 'Police' written on the chest and back.

Officers are required to wear a stab vest whilst on patrol. In addition, officers carry TETRA digital radios, Body Worn Video, rigid handcuffs, incapacitant spray, the ASP 21" collapsible baton, leg restraints, a resuscitation mask and a basic first aid kit.

=== Vehicles and livery ===
Hampshire and Isle of Wight Constabulary uses a wide selection of vehicles for their individual capabilities and the requirements of the roles for which they are employed.

In 1965, the constabulary purchased four Volvo 121 Amazon estates. This provoked controversy from the public and the government, as until then, all forces had used domestic cars (Austin, Jaguar, MG, Rover, Wolseley).

Škoda Octavia used by Hampshire and Isle of Wight Constabulary, parked outside Ryde Police Station in 2025

Historically, the force had used a distinctive vehicle paint scheme of retro-reflective red and white diagonal stripes above a retro-reflective chequered blue and white band. Since 2005, the standard yellow and blue retro-reflective battenberg markings, together with the force crest on the bonnet, on all marked, operational vehicles.

=== Aircraft ===
Aviation support is provided by the National Police Air Service established in 2012.

Hampshire Constabulary's former air support unit initially operated an Edgley Optica, G-KATY, as an observation platform in the mid-1980s. On 15 May 1985, the aircraft crashed, killing the pilot and police observer. Subsequently, Hampshire operated a fixed wing Britten-Norman BN-2 Islander from the former Royal Naval Air Station at Lee-on-the-Solent. In March 2001, the Islander was replaced by a Britten-Norman Defender 4000. In 2010, the Air Support Unit was disbanded following a decision to establish a joint South East Air Support Unit with Sussex Police and Surrey Police operating two helicopters.

== Strength and recruitment ==
As of March 2017, Hampshire and Isle of Wight Constabulary has 2,896 police officers, 364 special constables, 304 designated officers, 385 police community support officers and 1,421 police staff. By comparison, in 2010, the force had 3,748 police officers, 337 PCSOs and 2,424 police staff. The force has reduced its workforce by 23% since 2010, compared to the national average of 15%. This has led to some criticism from various sources around central government funding for the force.

== Performance ==
=== Her Majesty's Inspectorate of Constabulary ===
Previous results of inspections by Her Majesty's Inspectorate of Constabulary (HMIC) are published below:

PEEL category	Report date	Topic	Rating
Effectiveness	22 March 2018	Overall	Good
Effectiveness	22 March 2018	Investigating crime	Good
Effectiveness	22 March 2018	Preventing crime	Good
Effectiveness	22 March 2018	Protecting vulnerable people	Good
Effectiveness	22 March 2018	Tackling serious/organised crime	Good
Effectiveness	22 March 2018	Specialist capabilities	not rated
Efficiency	9 November 2017	Overall	Good
Efficiency	9 November 2017	Forecasting demand	Good
Efficiency	9 November 2017	Use of resources	Good
Efficiency	9 November 2017	Planning for future demand	Good
Legitimacy	12 December 2017	Overall	Good
Legitimacy	12 December 2017	Fairness towards the public	Good
Legitimacy	12 December 2017	Maintaining ethical behaviour	Good
Legitimacy	12 December 2017	Fairness towards employees	Good

In November 2014, a HMIC report on crime recording found Hampshire Constabulary failed to record, as crime, 40% of incidents, one of the three worst force performances in the country. A subsequent inspection by HMIC in 2018, showed that the overall crime recording rate had significantly increased to 91.3% of reported crimes being recorded as such.

=== Independent Office for Police Conduct ===
The Professional Standards department of the force investigate the majority of complaints made against police. However, details of complaints received are notified to the Independent Office for Police Conduct (IOPC) which is a non-departmental public body responsible for overseeing the system for handling complaints made against police forces throughout England and Wales. The IOPC may choose to manage or supervise investigations conducted into complaints and may conduct the investigations themselves in the most serious cases. The IOPC sets the standards of the investigation of complaints against police and also acts as the appeals body in cases where members of the public are dissatisfied with the way in which a police force has handled their complaint.

In the period April 2011 to December 2011, complaints and allegations made against officers of Hampshire Constabulary had decreased from the previous year (previous years figures in brackets). Hampshire's overall complaints rate of 181 (206) per 1,000 employees is slightly above the national average of 172 (159) per 1,000 employees. In that period Hampshire were above national average for complaints concerning 'Neglect or Failure in duty' and 'Oppressive Conduct or Harassment'. Of all complaints received during the period 0% (1%) were discontinued - national average 1% - some 5% (3%) were dispensed - national average 7% - and 6% (5%) were withdrawn - national average 10%). Of the total, 13% (11%) of complaints were found to have 'substantiated finding', 3% lower than the national average.

=== Stonewall Workplace Equality Index ===
The Stonewall Workplace Equality Index is an annual index of UK employers completed by the LGBT (Lesbian Gay Bisexual Transgender) rights charity Stonewall. Through their submissions to Stonewall, Hampshire Constabulary were consistently high performers on the index from 2006 to 2013, scoring no lower than 15th place overall. In 2009 and 2010 the Constabulary were 2nd place in Top Employer category. In 2017 the Constabulary were still in the top 100 at 65th (Leicestershire was the top police employer). From 2020 the Constabulary no longer featured in the Stonewall Workplace Equality Index.

== In popular culture ==
The crime fiction writer Graham Hurley draws on his knowledge of Hampshire Constabulary, and in particular Portsmouth CID, for his series of police procedural novels. Set in Portsmouth and revolving around the fictional Detective Inspector Joe Faraday they portray a gritty picture of the city and its crime.

Ruth Rendell's series of crime novels are set in the fictional town of Kingsmarkham. In the books the town is described as being in Sussex, however when the books were televised, Romsey was chosen as the setting for the location filming. Inspector Wexford is often seen wearing a Hampshire Constabulary tie and warrant card badge. Hampshire Constabulary authorised the use of the force logo and have provided props and material for the series.

A retired Hampshire detective anonymously published Welcome to the Farce; in 2018, recounting his service in the years leading up to his retirement. He used the pen name Detective Miggins and called the Constabulary 'Bullshire'.

The day-to-day work of Hampshire Constabulary featured in some 69 episodes, spanning three series, of the popular BBC One observational documentary, Real Rescues. This series first aired on BBC One in October 2007

The three-part, Channel 4 documentary, The Force followed the work of Hampshire detectives during the investigation of three serious crimes in the county. The first episode followed the progress of an enquiry into the murder of a woman whose body had been found in a field near Basingstoke whilst the second revealed the work of Hampshire's dedicated rape unit during a live investigation in Portsmouth. The last programme featured a re-investigation of the arson of a block of flats in Portsmouth as a result of which a young man died.

== Controversies ==
=== Social media arrest ===
In July 2022, the force was criticised when officers arrested a man for tweeting an image of a swastika, composed of four progress flags. Campaigner Harry Miller was arrested at the same time. The force's own police and crime commissioner publicly questioned the proportionality and necessity of the arrest. One week later, it was announced that the force was scrapping its hate-crime awareness courses.

=== Arrest of Henry Nowak ===
In May and June 2026, the force faced widespread criticism following the murder trial of 18-year-old student Henry Nowak, who was fatally stabbed in Southampton in December 2025 by Vickrum Digwa. Body-worn camera footage shown during the trial revealed that when officers arrived at the scene, Digwa falsely claimed that Nowak had racially abused him. Officers subsequently arrested and handcuffed Nowak as he lay dying, despite his recorded pleas of "I've been stabbed" and "I can't breathe." Nowak collapsed shortly afterward and died at the scene.

Following Digwa's conviction, Nowak's family described the police response as "inhumane and degrading." The Hampshire and Isle of Wight Police and Crime Commissioner, Donna Jones, publicly stated that the incident raised "serious concerns about police impartiality, fairness and judgement," while confirming that the force had apologised to the family. The incident prompted Prime Minister Keir Starmer to call for an expedited investigation by the Independent Office for Police Conduct (IOPC) into the officers' actions.

== See also ==
- Law enforcement in the United Kingdom
- List of law enforcement agencies in the United Kingdom, Crown Dependencies and British Overseas Territories

== Sources ==
- Dixon, B. (2006). A very special force: 175th Anniversary of Hampshire Special Constabulary. Hampshire Constabulary publication.
- Lee, J., Peake, C., Stevens, D and Williams, C (2001). Policing Hampshire and the Isle of Wight. Chichester, Phillimore. ISBN 1-86077-196-3
- Miggins, Detective (2018). Welcome to the Farce. Leicestershire, Matador. ISBN 978-1789014-914
- Syms, Diana (2019). Policing Petersfield 1840-2016. Petersfield Museum. ISBN 978-0-9934528-2-6
- Watt, I. A. (1967). A history of the Hampshire & Isle of Wight Constabulary 1839–1966. Winchester, Hampshire & Isle of Wight Constabulary.
- Williams, C (2012) 111 years policing Winchester Hampshire Constabulary History Society . ISBN 978-0-9568508-0-5
- Williams, C (2016) Women policing Hampshire and the Isle of Wight 1915-2016 Hampshire Constabulary History Society. ISBN 978-0-9568508-1-2
