= John Hoddinott =

British police officer

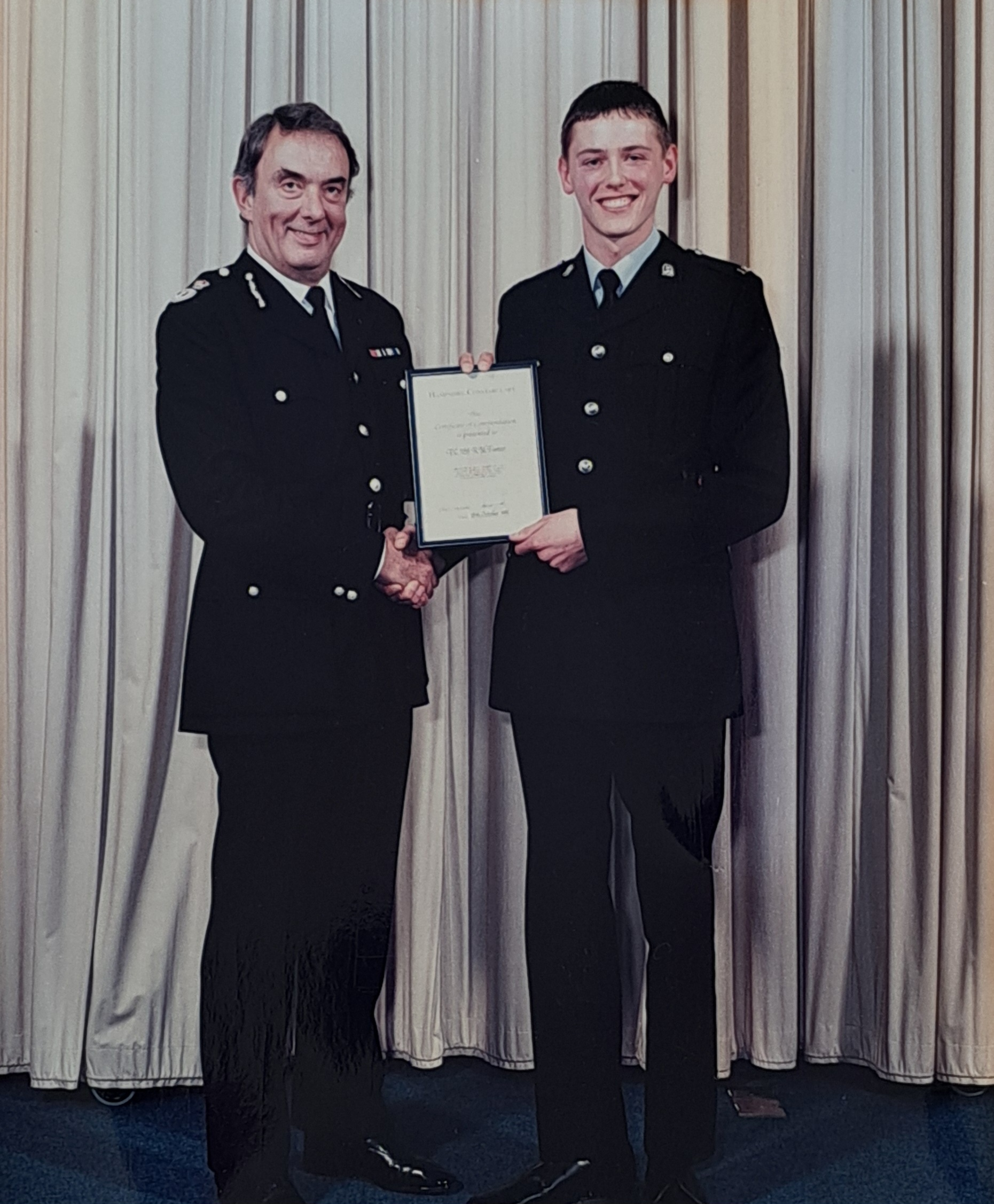
John Hoddinott presenting a Police Commendation to PC Richard FOSTER, both from Hampshire Constabulary.

Sir John Charles Hoddinott (21 September 1944 – 13 August 2001) was a senior British police officer who rose through the ranks to become Chief Constable of Hampshire Constabulary.

He was born in Winchester, Hampshire and educated at Barton Peveril Grammar School in Eastleigh. Both his father and grandfather had served in the Hampshire Constabulary.

Hoddinott however joined the Metropolitan Police as a cadet in 1961, becoming a constable in 1963, a sergeant in 1967 and an Inspector in 1969. In the latter year he attended Trinity College, Cambridge, and was awarded a degree in Law and Economics in 1972. After returning to duty with the Metropolitan Police he was transferred to the Obscene Publications squad as a Chief Inspector and then to the Drugs Squad as a Detective Superintendent. In 1981 he was put in charge of the CID at West End Central and promoted to Chief Superintendent.

In June 1981 he transferred to the Surrey Police as Assistant Chief Constable before becoming Deputy Chief Constable of Hampshire Police in 1983. He finally became Chief Constable of Hampshire Police on 1 September 1988. He retired in 1999.

He served as President of Association of Chief Police Officers (ACPO) in 1994–95 and as a Deputy Lieutenant of Hampshire.

== Private life ==
Hoddinott married Avril Petheram in 1967. The couple had two daughters.

== Death ==
Hoddinott died of a suspected heart attack at the age of 56 in Middlesbrough on 13 August 2001. At the time, he was leading a review of the Operation Lancet inquiry into alleged malpractice in the Cleveland Police.
