= Portsmouth City Police =

Defunct police force

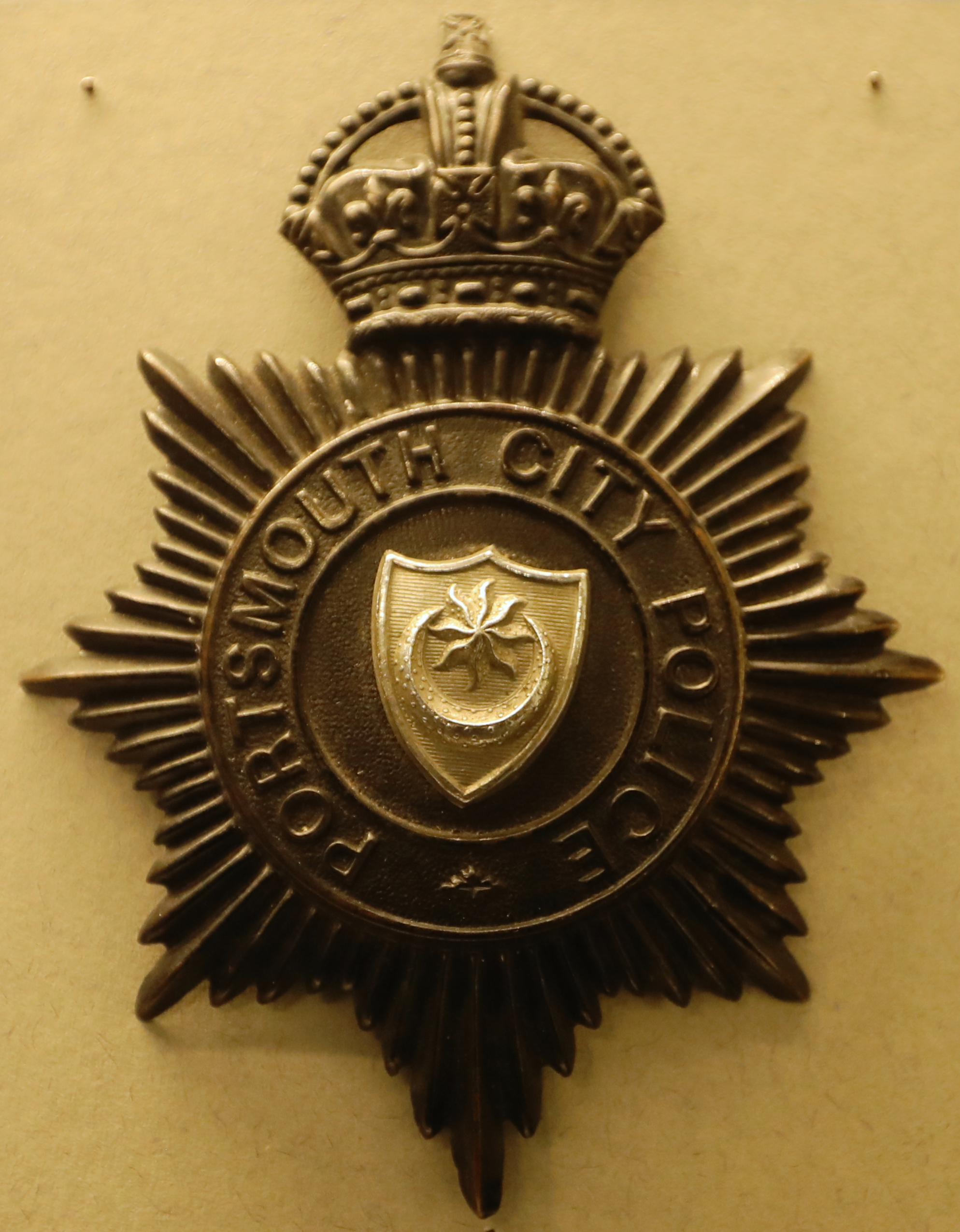
Portsmouth City Police helmet plate

Portsmouth City Police was the city force for Portsmouth, Hampshire from 1836 to 1967.

== Antecedents ==
The history of crime prevention in Portsmouth dates back to the 13th Century. Parish constables are again recorded in 1435, 1531 and 1621. By the early 18th century the city had 155 public houses, a number that was to grow steadily as the Royal Navy presence in the town grew ever larger.

== Formation of the discrete force ==
At a meeting on 25 January 1836 a committee was formed to decide on the size of the city's own police service. The first officers were sworn in on 18 March that year. The initial strength was 40 men.

== Notable events ==
- 1850: in August there was a three-day riot in Portsea between soldiers of the 50th Regiment of Foot and seamen of HMS Fox.
- 1861: in March a massive fire broke out at a travelling circus in the early hours. As well as rescuing nearly all the animals and dousing the flames, the police had to hold back an ever growing crowd!
- 1874: in August The Southsea Pier Company, having barred the way to the rival, Southsea Baths & Rooms, comes under sustained attack from irate bathers.
- 1903: in July the police demonstrate their new fire tender to the curious public. It skids in Park Road and crashes into an oncoming tram.
- 1914: in June a lady addressing a Suffragette rally is chased into a taxi. A group of men lift the taxi bodily into the air before the police arrive to restore order.
- 1932: in April a bank clerk and messenger were assaulted in Edinburgh Road and £23,477 stolen. The men were caught and sentenced to imprisonment plus "the cat".
- 1941: in January Portsmouth Guildhall is blitzed and the force's headquarters are re-located to a former girls' school in Southsea.

== Employment of women ==
Portsmouth decided to appoint 1919 its first women police in 1919 when three were hired. In 1922 it changed course return to being an all male force. Portsmouth would again begin employing women police in 1947. The first women sergeant was promoted to that position in 1952 and the first to reach inspector rank was promoted in 1963.

== Becomes part of the new Hampshire constabulary ==
On 31 March 1967 the force ceased to exist and was amalgamated into the newly formed Hampshire Constabulary. The final strength was 550 people.

== Head of service ==
Name	Rank	Years served
Captain Robert Elliott (82nd Regiment of Foot)	Superintendent	1839 to 1848
William Leggatt	Superintendent	1848 to 1859
Thomas Hayter Chase	Chief Officer	1859 to 1860
Richard Barber	Chief Officer	1860 to 1875
James Jervis	Chief Constable	1875 to 1880
Alfred William Cosser	Chief Constable	1880 to 1893
John Messier	Chief Constable	1893 to 1898
Arthur Prickett	Chief Constable	1898 to 1907
Thomas Davies	Chief Constable	1907 to 1940
Arthur Charles West	Chief Constable	1940 to 1958
William Newick Wilson	Chief Constable	1958 to 1964
Owen Flynn	Chief Constable	1964 to 1967
