= Southampton City Police =

Defunct police force

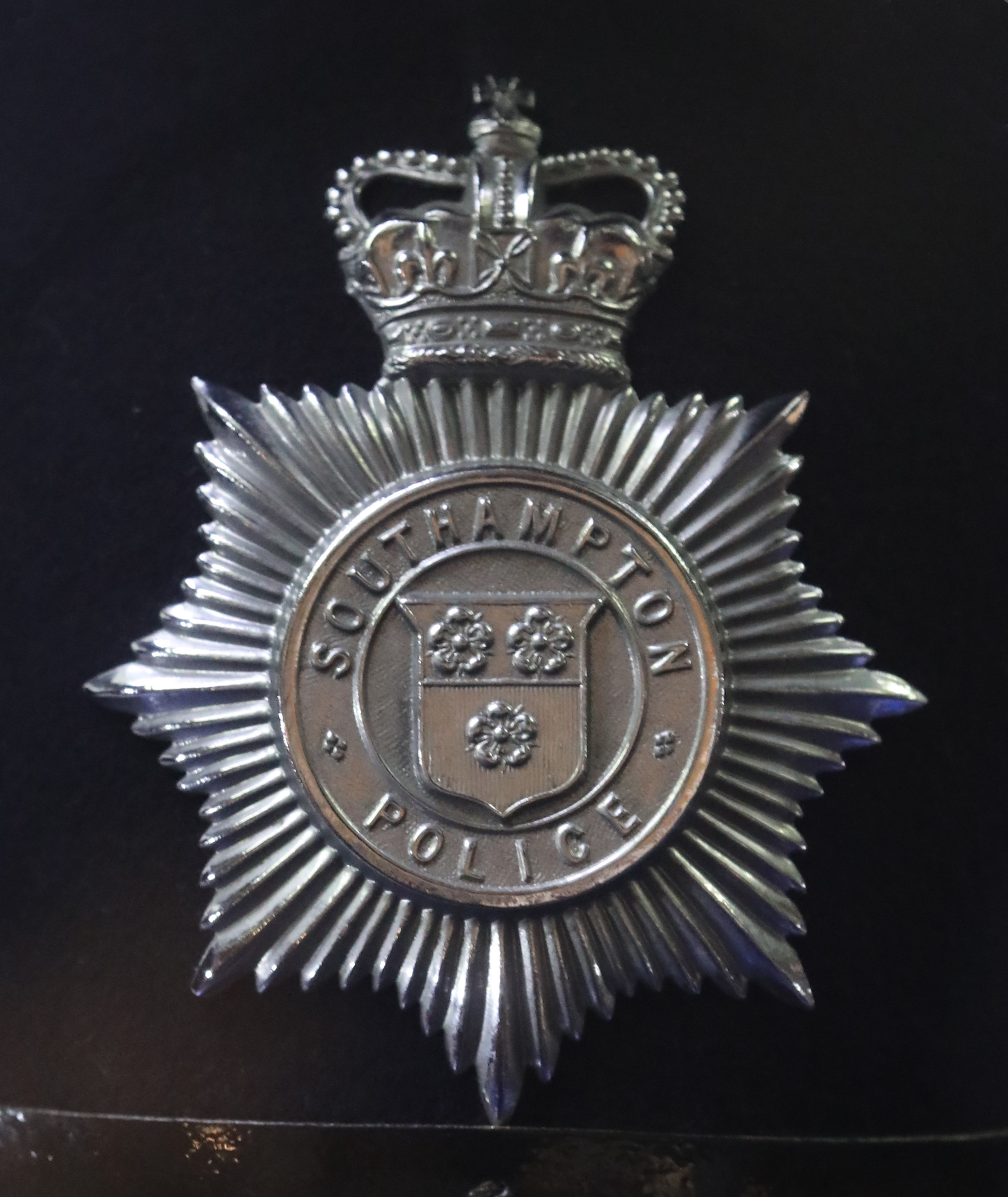
Southampton police helmet plate

Southampton city police were a police force that operated between 7 March 1836 and 1967 when they were merged into Hampshire Constabulary.

== History ==
=== Predecessors ===
Prior to the formation of the police force the then town of Southampton had a town watch consisting of 12 night watchmen and two day watchmen. It was supervised by the Commissioners for Paving, Watching and Lighting.

=== Formation ===
In 1835 parliament passed the Municipal Corporation Act， which along with broader reorganizations of local government required that the town set up a Watch committee which would recruit a sufficient number of fit men to police the town. The committee decided that a force of 22 constables 2 sergeants and 1 Inspector. The positions of First Sergeant and Second Sergeant were given to the previous heads of the watch while the position of Inspector was given to John Thomas Enright who had been recruited from the metropolitan police. The members of the existing watch were offered positions as constables with 8 of them declining or leaving prior to the swearing in of the new force.

=== Early years ===
In the first year, turnover was high with 14 mean leaving the force largely due to resignations. After this first year, turnover fell, averaging 28% up to 1840.

A series of robberies in 1851 led the town to request advice from the Metropolitan police.Following this advice, the Southampton force ceased rotating constables between beats every few days and instead assigned them to the same beat for periods of several months.

By August 1857, the police had a force of 30 constables and 7 sergeants. 21 of these constables and 5 of the sergeants covered the night shift, while the remainder covered the day shift.

=== 20th century ===
In June 1915, Southampton appointed its first woman police officer. In 1919, the number of policewomen on the Southampton force reached six. After the war, Southampton reduced the number of policewomen it employed to around two, a pattern that continued until the Second World War. None of the women were formally attested. Policewomen numbers again increased with the Second World War, and the first regular policewomen were attested in 1942.
