= List of police stations in the West Midlands =

Most police stations in the West Midlands county of England are now operated by the West Midlands Police, created on 1 April 1974, but many were built for its predecessors, and some of those closed before its creation. A number of the stations are listed buildings and others are locally listed by the relevant local authority. A few are operated by the British Transport Police.

This list also includes administrative buildings which do not have facilities for the visiting public.

== Birmingham ==
Prior to 1974, the majority of police stations in the city were operated by Birmingham City Police. However, as Birmingham's borders expanded over the twentieth century, it absorbed neighbouring territory from Staffordshire and Worcestershire, incorporating the existing local police stations and personnel into the city's infrastructure before all forces were unified under West Midlands Police.

=== Active stations ===
| Name | Location | Completed | Geo-coordinates | Notes | Designation | Image | Ref. |
|---|---|---|---|---|---|---|---|
| Acocks Green police station | 21 Yardley Road, Acocks Green | 1909 | 52°27′02″N 1°49′09″W | Built for Yardley Rural District Council, when Acocks Green was in Worcestershire. Decorated with a "three pears" motif from the Worcestershire coat of arms. The station maybe sold off | Locally listed at 'Grade B'. Nationally, Grade II listed. | Acocks Green police station | |
| Aston police station | Queen's Road, Aston | | 52°30′22″N 1°52′36″W | Firearms Base | | Aston police station | |
| Birmingham Central police station & HQ (Lloyd House) | Colmore Circus Queensway, Birmingham City Centre | 1964 | 52°29′02″N 1°53′50″W | Functions as the primary force headquarters for West Midlands Police. Following the permanent closure of the nearby Steelhouse Lane station in early 2017, the building was extensively refurbished to fully accommodate Birmingham Central police station operations. | | Birmingham Central police station & HQ (Lloyd House) More images | |
| Bournville police station | Bournville Lane, Bournville | | 52°25′46″N 1°56′59″W | Near the Bristol Road South between Selly Oak and Northfield | | Bournville police station | |
| Digbeth police station | High Street, Digbeth | | 52°28′35″N 1°53′25″W | Built by the Birmingham firm T. Elvins and Sons. The public contact office was closed for 10 years from 2015 before reopening in December 2025. | Locally listed at 'Grade A' | Digbeth police station More images | |
| Erdington police station | Sutton New Road and Wilton Road, Erdington | | 52°31′34″N 1°50′21″W | | | Erdington police station | |
| Handsworth West police station | Holyhead Road, Handsworth | | 52°30′21″N 1°56′50″W | | | Upload Photo | |
| King Heath police station | 1 High Street, Kings Heath | | 52°26′17″N 1°53′36″W | | | King Heath police station | |
| Moseley police station | Woodbridge Road, Moseley | | 52°26′54″N 1°53′13″W | Officers will relocate from Balsall Heath and Sparkhill, now that Moseley is refurbished | | Moseley police station | |
| Nechells police station | Fowler Street, Nechells | | 52°29′41″N 1°52′13″W | | | Upload Photo | |
| Newtown police station | 204 Bridge Street West, Newtown | | 52°29′37″N 1°53′58″W | | Locally listed at 'Grade B' | Upload Photo | |
| Quinton police station | 300 Quinton Road, Quinton | | 52°27′13″N 1°59′48″W | Closed 2019 - Reopened and refurbished 2024 | | Upload Photo | |
| Stechford police station | 338 Station Road, Stechford | | 52°28′42″N 1°48′26″W | The future of this station has been secured as of November 2025. | | Stechford police station | |
| Summerfield police station | Icknield Port Road, Summerfield | | 52°29′10″N 1°56′12″W | The station moved from its old building on Dudley Road, near Summerfield Park | | Upload Photo | |
| Sutton Coldfield police station | Lichfield Road, Sutton Coldfield | | 52°34′05″N 1°49′25″W | A new police station opened in July 2025 when service transferred to another part of the existing site. | | Sutton Coldfield police station | |
| West Midlands Police - Learning & Development Centre | Pershore Road, Edgbaston | | 52°27′15″N 1°54′26″W | Also known as Tally Ho Police Training | | West Midlands Police - Learning & Development Centre More images | |

=== Closed or demolished stations ===
| Name | Location | Completed | Geo-coordinates | Notes | Designation | Image | Ref. |
|---|---|---|---|---|---|---|---|
| Balsall Heath police station | Edward Road, Balsall Heath | 1869 | 52°27′25″N 1°53′18″W | Built originally for the Worcestershire Quarter Sessions Police Committee before boundary changes. Decommissioned and closed as an active asset, with all local neighbourhood teams completely relocated to the refurbished Moseley hub. | | Balsall Heath police station | |
| Billesley police station | Yardley Wood Road, Billesley | | 52°25′54″N 1°52′10″W | Demolished in 2024. A housing development called The Canopies was built here from 2025 to 2026. With a pair of cul-de-sacs called Theresa Way and Stewart Close after Theresa Stewart former leader of Birmingham City Council. | | Billesley police station | |
| Bordesley Green police station | 282 Bordesley Green | | 52°28′39″N 1°51′03″W | This is now Heartland Hostel. The police station closed down by 2010. | | Bordesley Green police station | |
| Canterbury Road police station | Canterbury Road, Perry Barr | 1904 | 52°30′45″N 1°54′05″W | Built when the area was still part of Staffordshire, featuring an exterior Staffordshire Knot emblem. It housed specialized police units but had no public front desk. Decommissioned and sold at auction, with planning permission later approved for conversion into 14 residential apartments. | Locally listed at 'Grade A' | Canterbury Road police station More images | |
| Castle Vale police station | 44 High Street, Castle Vale | | 52°31′17″N 1°47′01″W | This former police station was up for auction in October 2016 | | Castle Vale police station | |
| Dudley Road police station | Summerfield Park, Summerfield | | 52°29′10″N 1°56′16″W | Disused; at risk | | Dudley Road police station More images | |
| Edgbaston police station | Belgrave Middleway, Edgbaston | | 52°27′59″N 1°53′57″W | Permanently closed | | Edgbaston police station | |
| Hall Green police station | Robin Hood Lane, Hall Green | | 52°25′19″N 1°50′14″W | Following its closure, the building was converted into a succession of restaurants. It originally operated as the Blue Lamp, followed by the China Garden (closed 2022), Paradiso Pizzeria (2023), and In Chi (2024–2026). It reopened as Hojra Restaurant in August 2026. | | Hall Green police station | |
| Handsworth police station | Thornhill Road, Handsworth | 1878 | 52°30′13″N 1°55′42″W | Built at the same time as the nearby library and town hall. Originally in Staffordshire; includes a courthouse. The front counter to the general public in 2016. It permanently closed down by October 2023. | Locally listed at 'Grade B' | Upload Photo | |
| Harborne police station | Rose Road, Harborne | | 52°27′43″N 1°56′54″W | As of 2025, are plans to demolish Harborne Police Station, and build townhouses and apartments here. | | Harborne police station More images | |
| Hay Mills police station | Coventry Road, Yardley | | 52°27′46″N 1°49′26″W | Now a pub, 'The Old Bill and Bull'. | | Hay Mills police station More images | |
| Jewellery Quarter police station | Golden Square, Warstone Lane, Hockley | | 52°29′15″N 1°54′40″W | Located in what is now Golden Square. Closed by 2017. Replaced by the Diamond Factory. | | Jewellery Quarter police station | |
| Kenyon Street police station | Kenyon Street, Hockley | | 52°29′15″N 1°54′40″W | Closed 1972; demolished. | | Upload Photo | |
| Kingstanding police station | Kingstanding Road, Kingstanding | | 52°32′44″N 1°53′03″W | Closed in 2019 after being declared surplus to requirements by the force. The commercial building was sold off and subsequent planning applications were submitted to convert the premises into a mixture of four residential flats and a retail takeaway. | | Kingstanding police station More images | |
| Kings Norton police station | High Meadow Road, Kings Norton | | 52°24′26″N 1°55′35″W | Was demolished by January 2022. As of 2025 it was replaced by St. Nicholas Lodge from Churchill Living. Flats for the over 60's. | | Kings Norton police station More images | |
| Ladywood police station | Ladywood Middleway, Ladywood | | 52°28′34″N 1°55′30″W | Replaced an earlier station, nearby. Sold to developers in 2024. | | Ladywood police station | |
| Longbridge police station | Bristol Road South, Northfield | | 52°24′17″N 1°58′43″W | The former police station was sold at auction and was converted into offices on the ground floor and apartments above. | | Longbridge police station | |
| Perry Barr police station | 394 Walsall Road, Perry Barr | | 52°31′45″N 1°54′40″W | Sold September 2017 to the Great Barr Muslim Foundation, for conversion to a community centre. | | Perry Barr police station More images | |
| Shard End police station | 161 Packington Avenue, Shard End | | 52°29′33″N 1°46′36″W | Decommissioned as a local neighborhood base. While the final property disposal was temporarily back-logged to support teams during the Stechford station refurbishment, a formal housing planning application was filed in February 2026 to build three 5-bedroom homes on the site's car park. | | Shard End police station | |
| Sheldon police station | Sheldon Heath Road, Sheldon | | 52°28′14″N 1°47′04″W | It is in Garretts Green. It closed down in late 2017. | | Sheldon police station | |
| Sparkbrook Police Outpost | Stratford Road, Sparkbrook | | 52°27′45″N 1°52′31″W | Was at the site from at least 2009 to 2012. Replaced by an estate agent, barber shop and now a 24 hour convenience store. | | Upload Photo | |
| Sparkhill police station | Stratford Road, Sparkhill | 1897 | 52°27′02″N 1°51′53″W | Formerly housed the West Midlands Police Museum (it has been relocated to Steelhouse Lane). Relocated to Moseley to form a hub as Birmingham East. Closed in 2016, sold in 2023 to the Bosnian community. Now a community centre with café, religious and educational training spaces and a caretaker's flat called Bosnia House. | Locally listed at 'Grade B' | Sparkhill police station More images | |
| Steelhouse Lane police station | Steelhouse Lane, Birmingham | 1933 | 52°29′03″N 1°53′36″W | AKA Birmingham Central police station. The cell block is an older, Victorian building. The station closed permanently on Sunday 15 January 2017. | | Steelhouse Lane police station More images | |

== Coventry ==
Prior to 1969, policing in the city was administered by Coventry City Police. In 1969, the city force amalgamated with Warwickshire Constabulary to form the short-lived Warwickshire and Coventry Constabulary. This arrangement lasted until 1974, when Coventry was officially absorbed into the new West Midlands metropolitan county, passing its staff and operational stations over to West Midlands Police.

=== Active stations ===
| Name | Location | Completed | Geo-coordinates | Notes | Designation | Image | Ref. |
|---|---|---|---|---|---|---|---|
| Canley police station (Bow Court) | Bow Court, Fletchworth Gate, Canley | 2025 | 52°24′01″N 1°32′37″W | Opened in early 2025 as a modern, 24/7 non-public-facing deployment base for local response teams, replacing the old Fletchamstead Highway facility. | | Upload Photo | |
| Coventry Central police station | Little Park Street, Coventry | | 52°24′17″N 1°30′30″W | | | Coventry Central police station More images | |
| Willenhall police station | Chace Avenue, Willenhall | | 52°23′12″N 1°28′19″W | Reopened, after being closed for 10 years, in 2025. | | Willenhall police station | |

=== Closed or demolished stations ===
| Name | Location | Completed | Geo-coordinates | Notes | Designation | Image | Ref. |
|---|---|---|---|---|---|---|---|
| Canley police station | Fletchamstead Highway, Canley | | 52°23′36″N 1°33′06″W | Permanently closed by West Midlands Police after being deemed no longer fit for purpose. A prior layout listed it on Sir Henry Parkes Road. A demolition plan was officially submitted in October 2025 ahead of redevelopment. | | Upload Photo | |
| Foleshill police station | Stoney Stanton Road, Foleshill | | 52°25′33″N 1°29′41″W | Public front counter was shut in February 2015. The entire base was later closed completely and decommissioned as part of West Midlands Police cost-cutting measures. | | Upload Photo | |

== Dudley ==
Dudley's stations were originally operated by Dudley Borough Police, then from 1 April 1966 until 31 March 1974, by West Midlands Constabulary. Following the local government reorganisations of 1974, all local stations and personnel were absorbed into the modern West Midlands Police.

=== Active stations ===
| Name | Location | Completed | Geo-coordinates | Notes | Designation | Image | Ref. |
|---|---|---|---|---|---|---|---|
| Dudley Police Station (2025 - present) | Castlegate Way, Dudley | 2025 | 52°30′52″N 2°04′23″W | Opened from 17th November 2025 on the site of a former insurance call centre. | | Upload Photo | |

=== Closed or demolished stations ===
| Name | Location | Completed | Geo-coordinates | Notes | Designation | Image | Ref. |
|---|---|---|---|---|---|---|---|
| Brierley Hill Police Station | Bank Street, Brierley Hill | | 52°29′02″N 2°07′21″W | Part of Civic Hall complex, Closing end of 2025 | | Brierley Hill Police Station More images | |
| Dudley Police Station (closed by 2019) | New Street, Dudley | | 52°30′43″N 2°04′59″W | Now closed and sold (between 2017 and 2019). | | Dudley Police Station (closed by 2019) More images | |
| Historic Netherton police station | Northfield Road, Netherton | | 52°29′25″N 2°04′59″W | An older, historic police station building located adjacent to the Netherton Arts Centre. The premises were later decommissioned from police use and subsequently converted into a café. | | Historic Netherton police station | |
| Netherton police station | Church Road, Netherton | | 52°29′29″N 2°05′02″W | Permanently closed on 31 January 2016 as part of a cost-saving restructuring strategy by West Midlands Police. | | Upload Photo | |
| Sedgley police station | Vicar Street, Sedgley | 1864 | 52°32′25″N 2°07′25″W | Originally built as a village workhouse in 1734 and converted into a police station and court in the 1860s. Operational policing ceased in October 2020 when staff relocated to Dudley Fire Station. The landmark building has since been converted into a nine-apartment residential complex named All Saints View, retaining its original cell doors and courtroom features. | | Sedgley police station More images | |
| Stourbridge police station | New Road, Stourbridge | 1885 | 52°27′17″N 2°08′42″W | Built as the County Police station, it replaced an earlier court and jail on the site. Now closed and being developed into luxury apartments. | | Stourbridge police station More images | |

== Sandwell ==
Before 1974, police stations in Sandwell were operated by Staffordshire Police (with some areas falling under the jurisdiction of West Midlands Constabulary following the 1966 Black Country boundary changes). In 1974, the county boroughs of Warley and West Bromwich merged to form Sandwell, with policing control transferring entirely to West Midlands Police.

=== Active stations ===
| Name | Location | Completed | Geo-coordinates | Notes | Designation | Image | Ref. |
|---|---|---|---|---|---|---|---|
| Smethwick police station | Piddock Road, Smethwick | 1907 | 52°29′38″N 1°58′02″W | Also known as South Sandwell Police Station. Saved from total closure after a plan was approved to split the site; the former courthouse section was sold for residential development, while the station building was retained as an active, non-public operational base for neighbourhood officers. | | Upload Photo | |
| Tipton police station | Lower Church Lane, Tipton | | 52°31′33″N 2°04′24″W | Saved from scheduled closure following a successful community campaign. Reopened as a 999 emergency response hub hosting local neighbourhood officers. | | Upload Photo | |
| West Bromwich Police Station | Oak Road and Price Street, West Bromwich | 2011 | 52°31′02″N 1°59′54″W | | | West Bromwich Police Station | |

=== Closed or demolished stations ===
| Name | Location | Completed | Geo-coordinates | Notes | Designation | Image | Ref. |
|---|---|---|---|---|---|---|---|
| Court of Requests | Church Street, Oldbury | 1816 | 52°30′17″N 2°00′57″W | former police station & court; now J D Wetherspoon pub, "Court of Requests" | Grade II listed | Court of Requests | |
| Oldbury police station | Stone Street (off Oldbury Ringway), Oldbury | | 52°30′08″N 2°00′45″W | Permanently closed by West Midlands Police. Planning permission was granted by Sandwell Council in May 2026 to convert the vacant building into six residential flats. | | Oldbury police station | |
| Wednesbury police station | Holyhead Road, Wednesbury | 1977 | 52°33′14″N 2°01′24″W | Permanently closed and decommissioned as part of the West Midlands Police estates consolidation program. | | Wednesbury police station More images | |
| Windmill House (Police Training Centre) | 160 Windmill Lane, Smethwick | 1970s | 52°29′24″N 1°57′24″W | Not a public police station, but a West Midlands Police training centre and accommodation hostel. Closed by the force and subsequently subject to a January 2026 planning application for conversion into a 76-bed residential HMO supporting local healthcare staff. | | Windmill House (Police Training Centre) | |

== Solihull ==
Before the creation of the West Midlands metropolitan county in 1974, the town of Solihull and its surrounding rural districts were part of the historic county of Warwickshire. Policing and local stations in the area—including newer developments like Chelmsley Wood—were originally constructed and operated by Warwickshire Constabulary before being transferred over to West Midlands Police.

=== Active stations ===
| Name | Location | Completed | Geo-coordinates | Notes | Designation | Image | Ref. |
|---|---|---|---|---|---|---|---|
| Solihull police station | Homer Road, Solihull | | 52°24′44″N 1°46′51″W | As of 2026 is still open. | | Solihull police station | |
| Chelmsley Wood police station - The Walk-in Centre | Ceolmund Crescent, Chelmsley Wood | | 52°28′52″N 1°44′29″W | Still open as of 2026. | | Chelmsley Wood police station - The Walk-in Centre More images | |

=== Closed or demolished stations ===
| Name | Location | Completed | Geo-coordinates | Notes | Designation | Image | Ref. |
|---|---|---|---|---|---|---|---|
| Shirley police station | Stratford Road, Shirley | | 52°24′33″N 1°49′31″W | Closed down in 2015, was for sale in 2017. Demolished in 2018. Replaced by Sir Robert Peel Court. | | Shirley police station | |

== Walsall ==
Walsall's stations were originally operated by Walsall Borough Police, then from 1 April 1966 until 31 March 1974, by West Midlands Constabulary. Operation of these buildings passed over to West Midlands Police upon its formation on 1 April 1974.

=== Active stations ===
| Name | Location | Completed | Geo-coordinates | Notes | Designation | Image | Ref. |
|---|---|---|---|---|---|---|---|
| Brownhills police station | 25 Chester Road North, Brownhills | | 52°38′59″N 1°56′16″W | | | Brownhills police station | |
| Bloxwich police station | 1 Station Street, Bloxwich | | 52°36′52″N 2°00′20″W | | | Upload Photo | |

=== Closed or demolished stations ===
| Name | Location | Completed | Geo-coordinates | Notes | Designation | Image | Ref. |
|---|---|---|---|---|---|---|---|
| Aldridge police station | Anchor Road, Aldridge | | 52°36′14″N 1°55′05″W | Ceased operating as a public counter station in 2014. The building was officially sold off in June 2025, with the neighbourhood policing team co-locating to Aldridge Fire Station on Northgate. | | Upload Photo | |
| Darlaston police station | Crescent Road, Darlaston | | 52°34′06″N 2°02′00″W | Sold 2019. Plans to convert to residential flats; retaining frontage. | Grade II listed. | Darlaston police station | |
| Walsall police station (from 1866) | Goodall Street, Walsall | 1866 | 52°35′00″N 1°58′43″W | It's now Sofia's Restaurant | | Walsall police station (from 1866) | |
| Leamore Police Outpost | Stephenson Avenue, Leamore | | 52°36′06″N 2°00′27″W | Was next to the BCHA centre. Closed down by 2017. | | Leamore Police Outpost | |
| Walsall police station (until 2016) | Green Lane, Walsall | | 52°35′20″N 1°59′12″W | Closed down in 2016 | | Upload Photo | |
| Willenhall police station | John Street, Willenhall | 1939 | 52°35′02″N 2°03′12″W | Closed by 2024. Reopening as of April 2026 as The Old Station House as apartments. | | Willenhall police station | |

== Wolverhampton ==
Wolverhampton's stations were originally operated by Wolverhampton Borough Police, then from 1 April 1966 until 31 March 1974, by West Midlands Constabulary. Control of the city's stations and policing infrastructure transferred to West Midlands Police in 1974.

=== Active stations ===
| Name | Location | Completed | Geo-coordinates | Notes | Designation | Image | Ref. |
|---|---|---|---|---|---|---|---|
| Low Hill Police Base | 147 Fifth Avenue, Low Hill | | 52°36′28″N 2°07′01″W | | | Upload Photo | |
| Tettenhall police station | 30 High Street, Tettenhall | | 52°35′51″N 2°10′06″W | | | Tettenhall police station | |
| Wednesfield police station | Alfred Squire Road, Wednesfield | | 52°35′56″N 2°04′51″W | May close and be sold off | | Wednesfield police station | |
| Wolverhampton Central police station | Metro One Campus, Bilston Street, Wolverhampton | | 52°35′04″N 2°07′28″W | As of 2025 the future of this station has been secured and it will be renovated over a 16 month period. | | Wolverhampton Central police station More images | |

=== Closed or demolished stations ===
| Name | Location | Completed | Geo-coordinates | Notes | Designation | Image | Ref. |
|---|---|---|---|---|---|---|---|
| Bilston police station | Mount Pleasant, Bilston | | 52°34′02″N 2°04′26″W | Closed down | | Bilston police station More images | |
