= West Midlands Constabulary =

Agency overview
- Formed: 1 April 1966
- Preceding agencies: Dudley Borough Police; Walsall Borough Police; Wolverhampton Borough Police; Staffordshire Constabulary (part); Worcestershire Constabulary (part)
- Dissolved: 31 March 1974
- Superseding agency: West Midlands Police

Jurisdictional structure
- Operations jurisdiction: England, UK
- Legal jurisdiction: England & Wales
- Constituting instrument: Police Act 1964
- General nature: Local civilian police

Operational structure
- Agency executives: Norman W. Goodchild, Chief constable; Edwin Solomon, Chief constable
- Parent agency: Home Office

The West Midlands Constabulary was a police force in the West Midlands of England.

It was created on 1 April 1966 under the Police Act 1964, with the re-organisation of the Black Country area as the five contiguous county boroughs of Dudley, Walsall, Warley, West Bromwich and Wolverhampton. Dudley Borough Police, Walsall Borough Police and Wolverhampton Borough Police were incorporated wholly into the new force. It also took in parts of the Staffordshire Constabulary and Worcestershire Constabulary.

The force was initially headed by Chief Constable Norman W. Goodchild, former Chief Constable of Wolverhampton Borough Police, until 1967, when he was replaced by Edwin Solomon, former Chief Constable of Walsall Borough Police.

On 1 April 1974 it amalgamated with the Birmingham City Police and parts of Staffordshire County and Stoke-on-Trent Constabulary, Warwickshire and Coventry Constabulary and West Mercia Constabulary to form the West Midlands Police, because of the Local Government Act 1972 which created the new West Midlands metropolitan county, which covered the West Midlands constabulary area along with Birmingham and Coventry and a few other surrounding towns.

== See also ==
- Law enforcement in the United Kingdom
- List of law enforcement agencies in the United Kingdom, Crown Dependencies and British Overseas Territories
