= Walsall Borough Police =

Agency overview
- Formed: 1832
- Preceding agency: none
- Dissolved: 31 March 1966
- Superseding agency: West Midlands Constabulary

Jurisdictional structure
- Operations jurisdiction: England

Walsall Borough Police was a police force in the Borough of Walsall, then in Staffordshire, in England, from 1832–1966.

== History ==
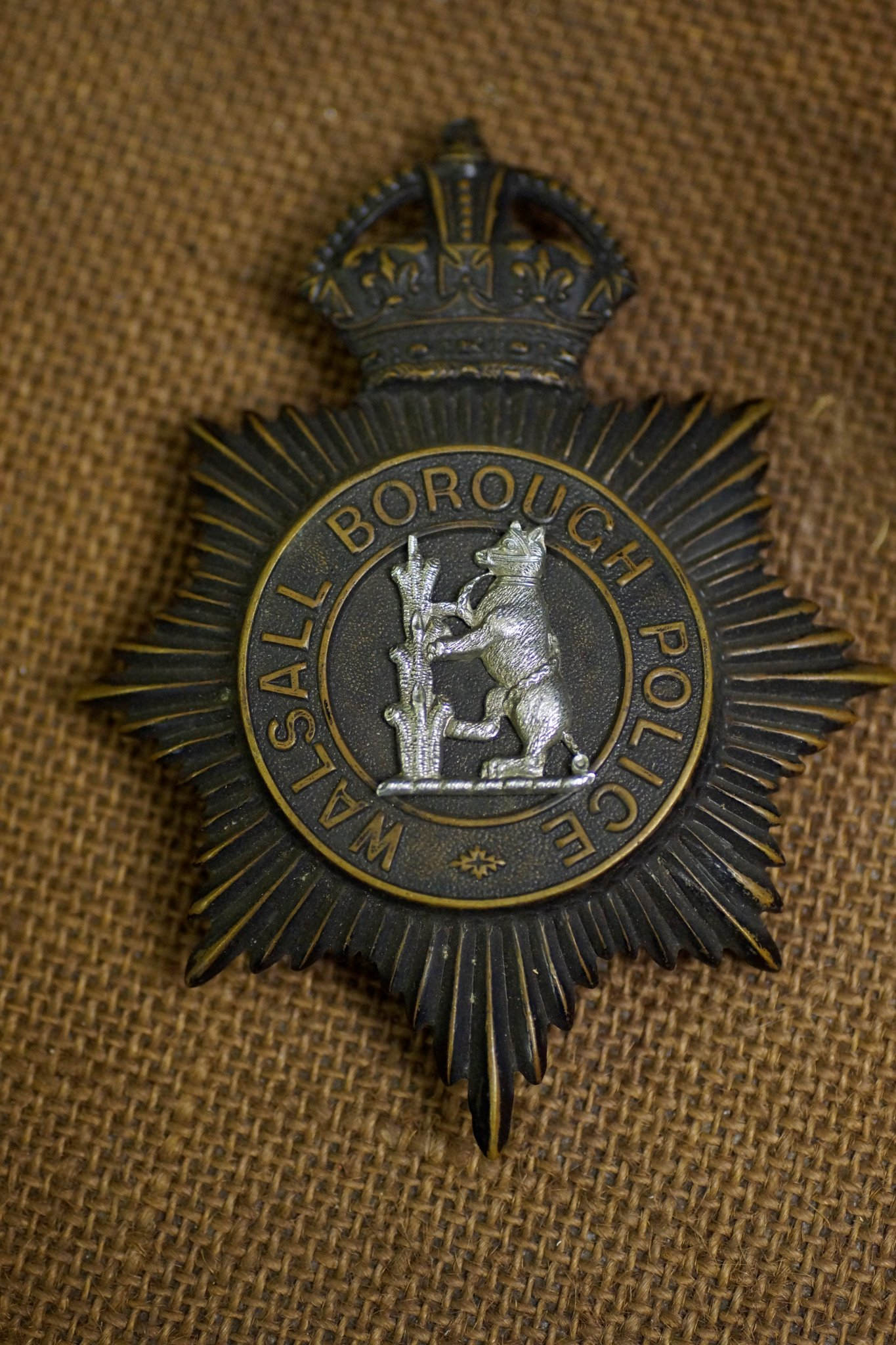
WMP museum – Walsall Borough Police helmet badge in the West Midlands Police Museum

The force was created on 6 July 1832 with one superintendent and three constables. Following the Municipal Corporations Act 1835, the force came under the control of Walsall Corporation, via a watch committee. From 1857, the force had a superintendent, four sergeants and 19 constables. Two plainclothes detectives were appointed in 1858. At the start of the 20th century the force had 78 men. The first two women constables were appointed in 1918.

Following the recommendations of the 1960 Royal Commission on the Police, the force was merged, with Wolverhampton Borough Police and Dudley Borough Police, and parts of the Staffordshire Constabulary and Worcestershire Constabulary, into the West Midlands Constabulary from 1 April 1966. Since a further merger in 1974, Walsall has been served by the West Midlands Police.

== Chief officers ==
Until 1885, the officer leading the force was accorded the rank of Superintendent. After that date, they were Chief Constables. They were:

=== Superintendents ===
- 1832–1835: Frederick H West
- 1836–1840: Jonathan Ryder
- 1840–1841: John Raymond
- 1841–1850: John Rofe
- 1850–1850: Joshua Burton
- 1850–1853: John Armishaw
- 1853–1855: Edmund Bilson
- 1855–1885: John Wyatt Cater

=== Chief Constables ===
- 1885–1887: George Tewsley
- 1887–1900: Christopher Taylor
- 1900–1901: Nicholson R. Gardiner
- 1902–1921: Alexander Thompson
- 1921–1932: G. H. Ballance
- 1932–1952: T. Mark Watson
- 1953–1958: Donald Lockett
- 1958–1964: Kenneth Mortimer Wherly
- 1964–1966: Edwin Solomon
