= Wolverhampton Borough Police =

English police force

Agency overview
- Formed: 1837
- Preceding agency: none
- Dissolved: 1966
- Superseding agency: West Midlands Constabulary

Jurisdictional structure
- Operations jurisdiction: England

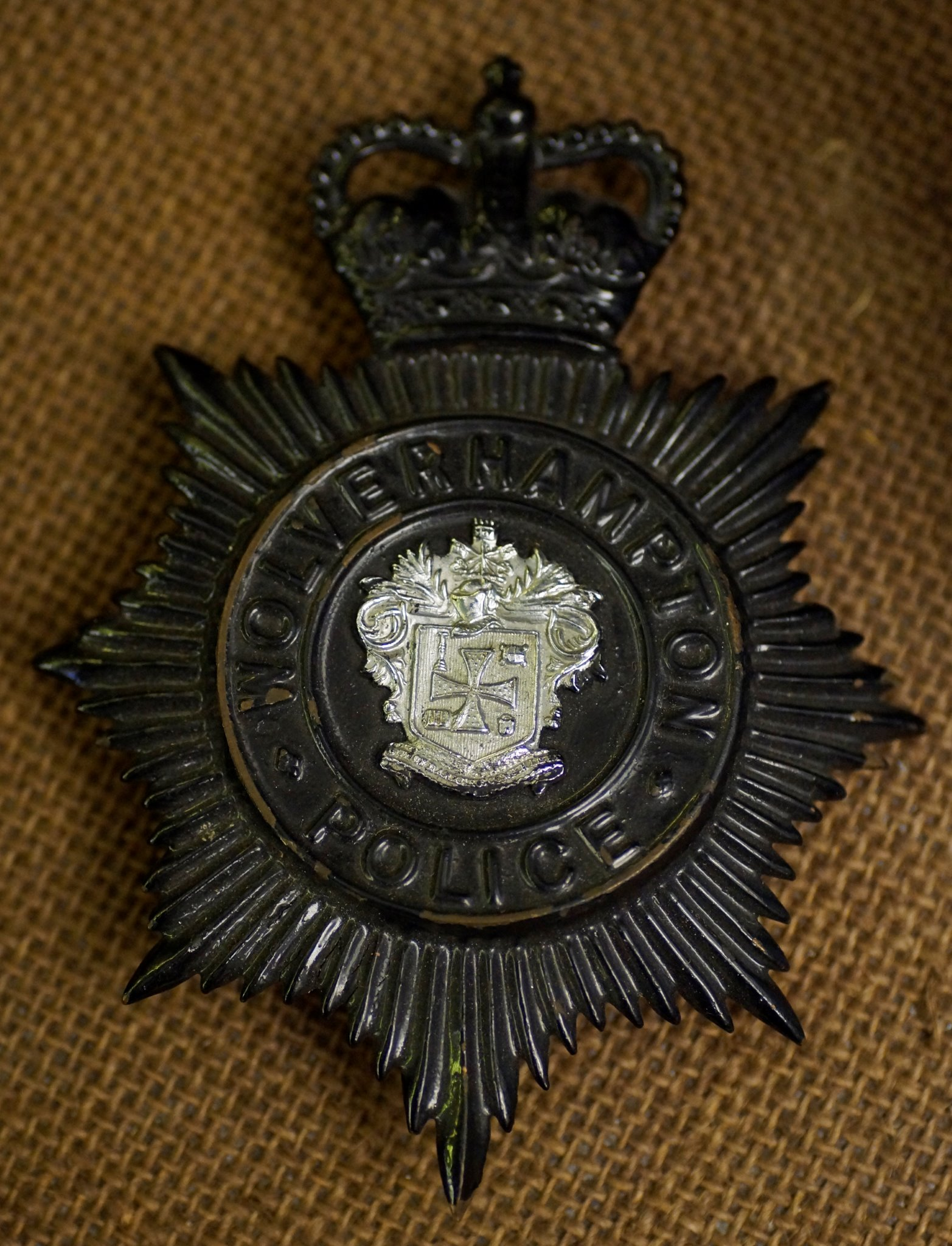
Wolverhapton Borough Police badge in the West Midlands Police Museum

Wolverhampton Borough Police was a police service in the Borough of Wolverhampton from 1837 to 1966, when it was merged into the West Midlands Constabulary.

The town's commissioners approved the formation of the police force on 3 August 1837. The original Superintendent was Richard Castle, who was appointed with the assistance of the Metropolitan Police, with a salary of five shillings and six pence per day. The force originally consisted of one sergeant and five police constables and was based in the old Town Hall, Garrick Street.

By the early 1900s officer numbers had increased to 109 men. The first female officers were employed in 1937 and were immediately attached to the Criminal Investigation Department. Numbers were increased once more following World War II, with 215 men and 8 women being in post to meet the increased demand for policing.

The force continued to grow in size, with more than 300 police officers employed by the 1960s. Following a Royal Commission on the police in 1960, it was merged with Dudley Borough Police and Walsall Borough Police, and parts of the Staffordshire Constabulary and Worcestershire Constabulary, to become the West Midlands Constabulary from 1 April 1966. Since a further merger in 1974, Wolverhampton has been served by the West Midlands Police.

== Chief Constables ==
- 1837–1842 - Richard Castle
- 1848–1857 - Lt. Col. Gilbert Hogg
- 1857–1878 - Capt. Henry Sergrave
- 1878–1891 - Major Robert David Dewar Hay
- 1891–1916 - Capt. Lindsay Robert Burnett
- 1916–1929 - David Webster
- 1930–1943 - Edwin Tilley
- 1944–1966 - Norman W. Goodchild
