= Dudley Borough Police =

Defunct police force

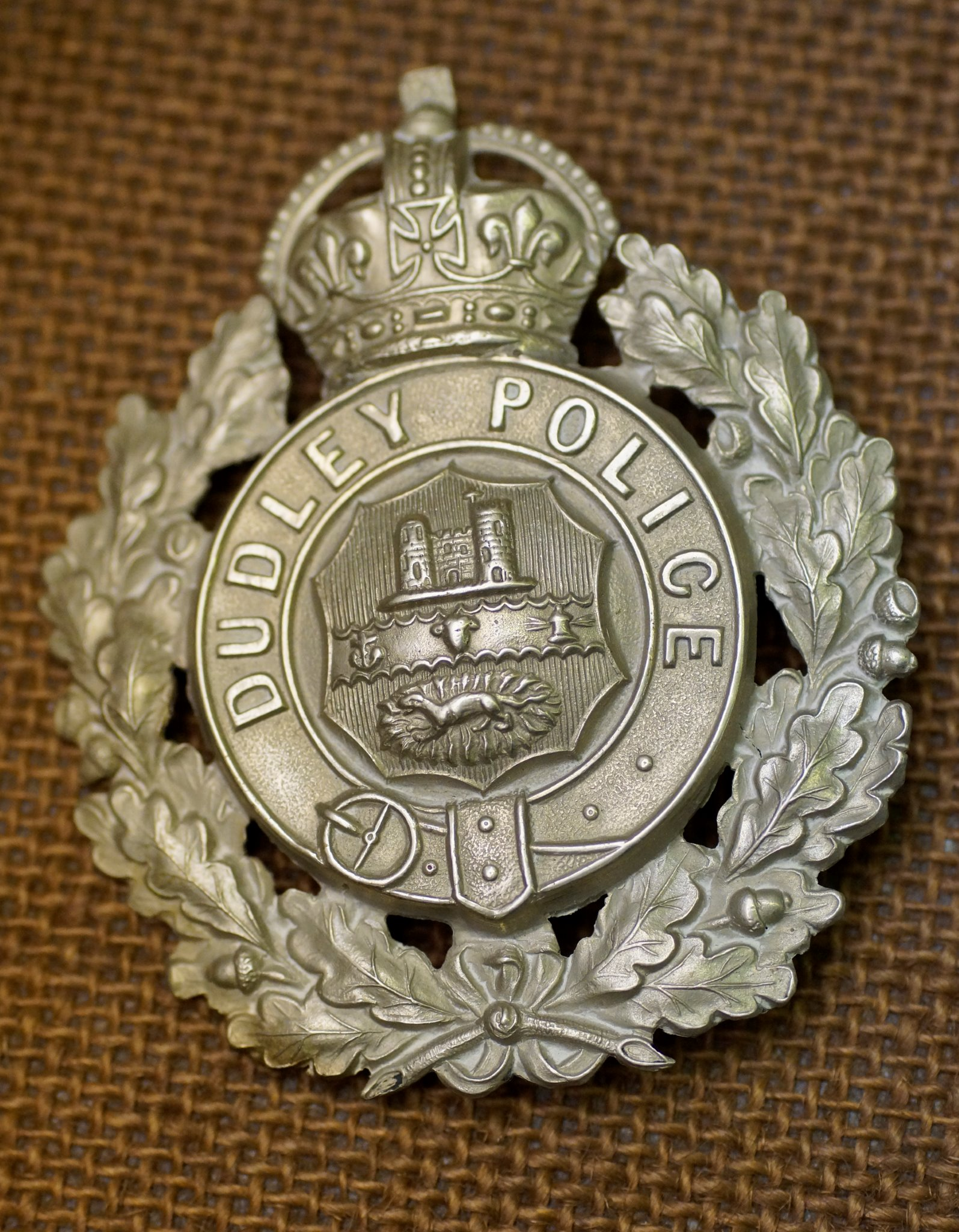
Dudley Borough Police cap badge, in the West Midlands Police Museum

Dudley Borough Police was a police force in the Borough of Dudley, then an exclave of Worcestershire, in England, from 1920–1966.

== History ==
From 1845 until 1920, Dudley was policed by the Dudley Division of the Worcestershire Constabulary. Unusually, while the Worcestershire Standing Joint Committee had control over the administration and discipline of Dudley's police, the Dudley's local watch committee was responsible for financial matters and recruitment. This caused many tensions. As a consequence, Dudley Borough Police was created, with effect from 1 April 1920.

Following the recommendations of the 1960 Royal Commission on the Police, the force was merged, with Walsall Borough Police and Wolverhampton Borough Police, and parts of the Staffordshire Constabulary and Worcestershire Constabulary, into the West Midlands Constabulary from 1 April 1966. Since a further merger in 1974, Dudley has been served by the West Midlands Police.

== Chief constables ==
- 1 April 1920 – 1946: James Niven Campbell
- 1946 – 31 March 1966: Charles William Johnson
