= Steelhouse Lane police station =

Former police station in Birmingham, England

Coordinates: 52.4843°N 1.8934°W

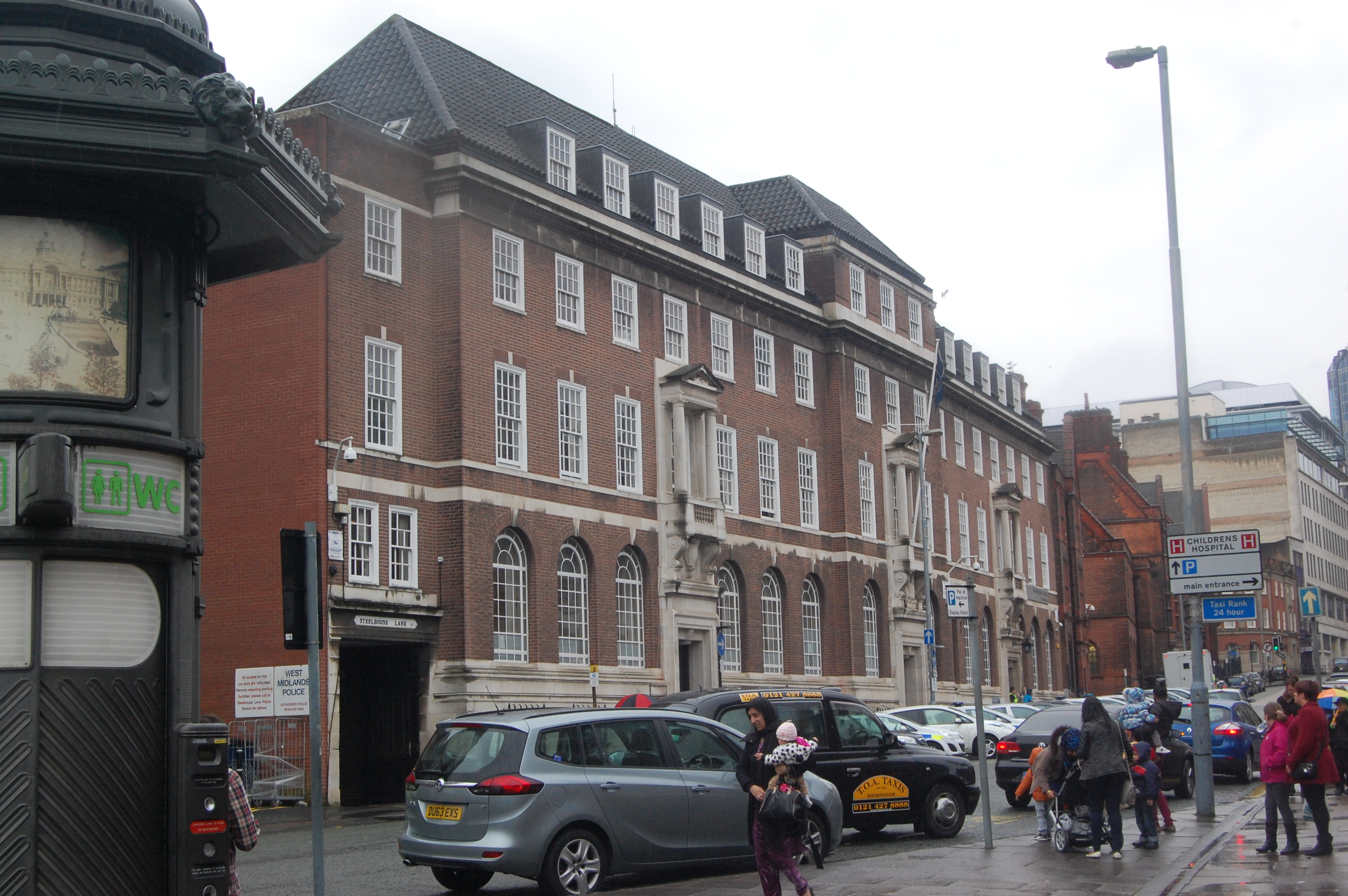
The station in March 2014, with cell block at far end

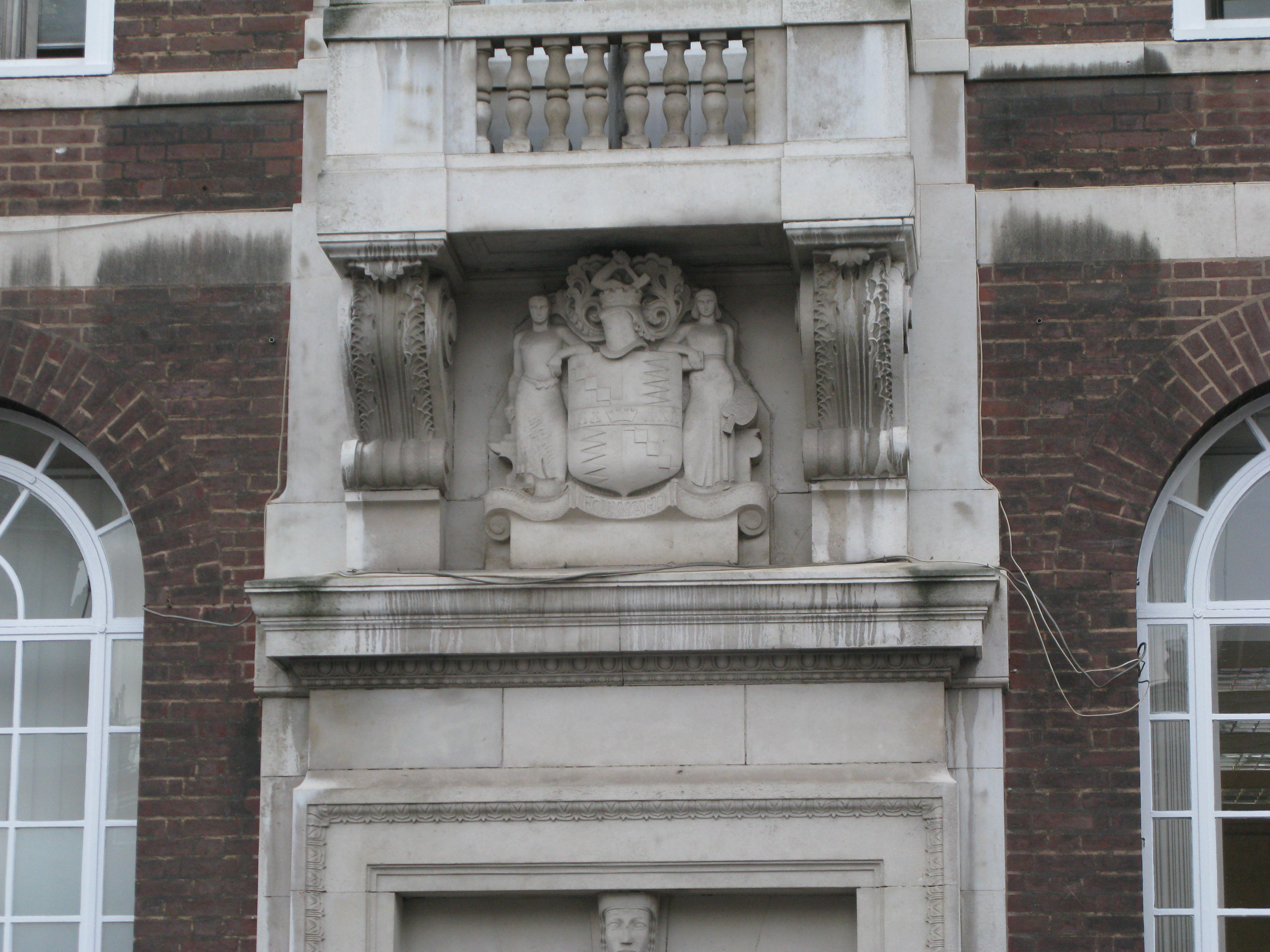
Keystone Head over the central doorway, by William Bloye, showing the Coat of arms of Birmingham

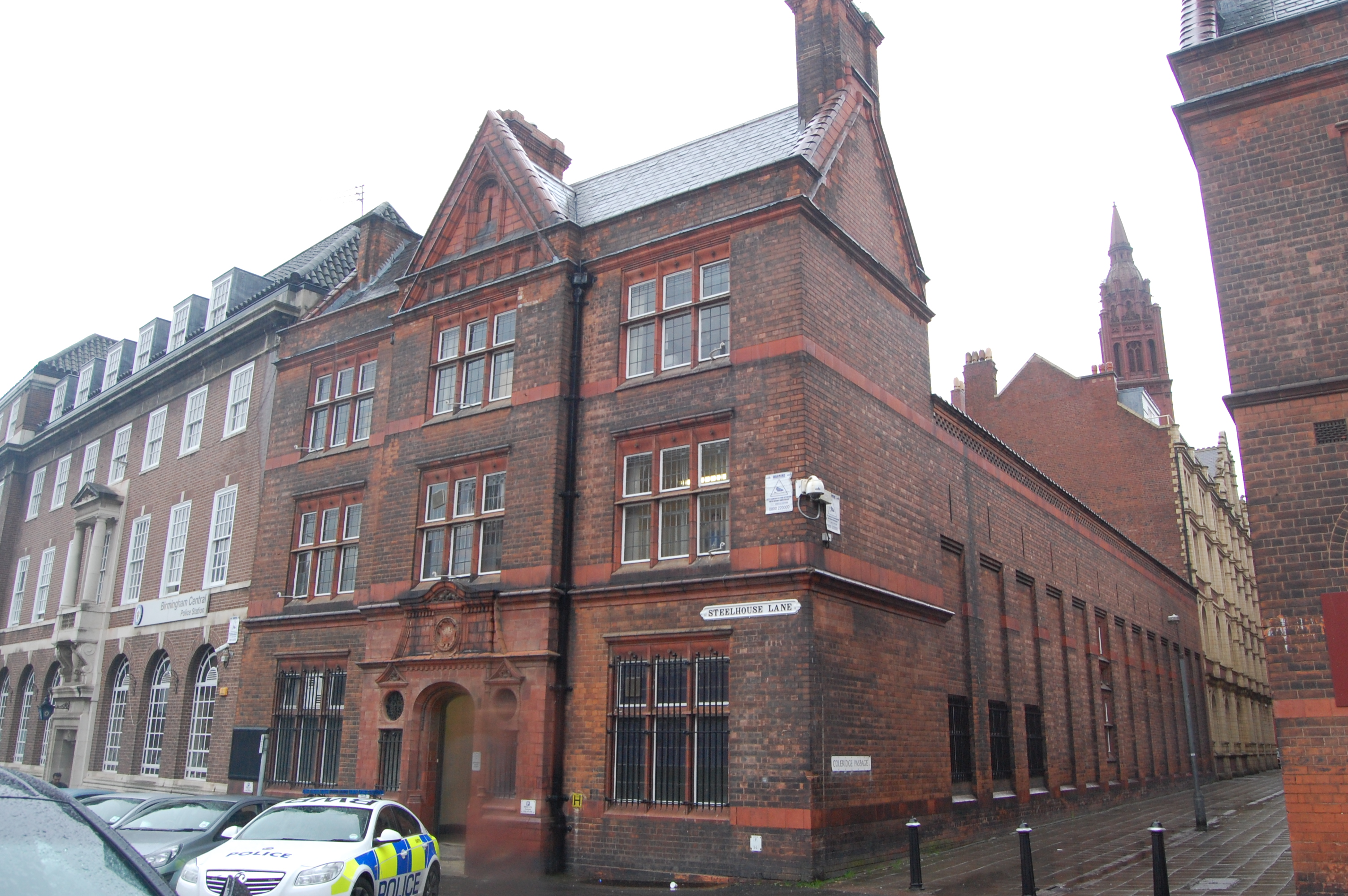
The Victorian cell block.

Steelhouse Lane police station is a former police station in central Birmingham, England. It was built for the Birmingham City Police and opened in 1933 as their Central Police Station, replacing a Victorian station on the same site. It was used by their successor, the West Midlands Police, until 2017 where they transferred to Lloyd House, also the force's HQ. The carvings over the entrances, including the coat of arms of Birmingham, are by the local sculptor William Bloye.

The station sits on a plot of land at the rear of the former Victoria Law Courts (now a magistrates' court), which was originally acquired for the extension of the court building. It faces Birmingham Children's Hospital.

The building sits in Birmingham City Council's Steelhouse Lane conservation area, which was designated in October 1993. The 1933 station itself, in neo-Georgian style is not a listed building, but the adjacent, late-nineteenth century cell block on the corner of Coleridge Passage was given Grade II protection on 8 July 1982 for its special architectural interest: the three-story building has a brick and terra cotta facade with many ornaments, and it has a slate roof. A tunnel links the cell block to the courts.

The City of Birmingham Orchestra, (later renamed the City of Birmingham Symphony Orchestra) held its first rehearsal in the band room at the old station, at 9.30am on 4 September 1920. For around sixty years, until closed in 2005, the station housed a private bar, allowing officers to drink when not on duty.

The police station closed for the final time on Sunday 15 January 2017.

The West Midlands Police Museum relocated to the listed cell block in 2022.
