= Shropshire Constabulary =

Defunct police force

Shropshire Constabulary was the territorial police force responsible for policing rural Shropshire in central England from 1840 until 1967, when it became part of West Mercia Constabulary.

== History ==
The Shropshire Constabulary was formed along with borough forces in the towns of Shrewsbury, Bridgnorth, Ludlow, Much Wenlock and Oswestry. In the early years they were known as ‘Paddy Mayne’s grasshoppers’ and rabbits because the first Chief Constable was Irish and the constables wore green uniforms. The headquarters were at 27, Swan Hill, Shrewsbury.

In 1947 the Shropshire Constabulary absorbed Shrewsbury Borough Constabulary. On 1 October 1967 the Shropshire Constabulary was amalgamated with the Worcestershire Constabulary, Herefordshire Constabulary and Worcester City Police to form the West Mercia Constabulary, later the West Mercia Police.

== Chief Constables ==
- 1840–1859 : John Dawson Mayne (first Chief Constable of Shropshire)
- 1859–1864 : Captain Philip Henry Crampton
- 1864–1866 : Colonel Edward B. Cureton
- 1866-1889 : Colonel R. J. Edgell
- 1890–1905 : Captain George Williams Freeman
- 1905–1908 : Major Llewellyn William Atcherley (later Sir Llewellyn Acherley)
- 1908–1914 : Captain Gerard Lysley Derriman (killed in action, World War I, 1915)
- 1916–1918 : A. Wood-Acton
- 1918–1935 : Major Jack Becke
- 1935–1946 : Lt Colonel Harold A. Golden
  - 5 February 1946–6 February 1946 : Anthony Tew
- 1946–1962 : Douglas Osmond (later Sir Douglas Osmond)
- 1962–1967 : Robert George Fenwick
- 1967 : Merged with other forces to form West Mercia Constabulary
