= Gerard Lysley Derriman =

British army officer and animal welfare campaigner

- Born: January 1870; London
- Died: 7 August 1915 (aged 45); Western Front
- Occupation: British Army Officer

Captain Gerard Lysley Derriman (January 1870 – 7 August 1915) was a British Army officer in the Grenadier Guards and chief constable of Shropshire Constabulary. He was an animal welfare campaigner known for his advocacy of humane slaughter.

== Biography ==
Derriman was born in 1870. He was the eldest son of Admiral C. H. Derriman. He married Ruth Margaret in 1907. He joined the Grenadier Guards as a second lieutenant in November 1889 after graduating from the Royal Military College, Sandhurst, and became lieutenant in December 1893. He served in the South African War as staff captain for Imperial Yeomanry and the joined the Reserve of Officers in 1904. He was promoted to captain in August 1904and was active in operations in Cape Colony, Orange River Colony and the Transvaal. He received the King's and Queen's medals with five clasps. Derriman was appointed the chief constable of Shropshire Constabulary on 2 September 1908. He re-joined his regiment in 1914 and was wounded in July, 1915.

He died on 7 August 1915 from shrapnel wounds on the Western Front. Derriman is buried at the Le Treport Military Cemetery. He is commemorated upon the Shrewsbury Police Great War Memorial at their headquarters on Monkmoor Road.

== Animal welfare ==
Derriman was secretary of the RSPCA from 1905 to 1908. In 1906, Derriman invented a "humane killer" for cattle. Derriman patented the RSPCA Humane Killer in 1908. It was a 0.450 calibre free bullet firearm with a wire running down the shaft of the weapon as a trigger. From an animal welfare perspective it was seen as an improvement over other humane killers and afforded the operator a safer distance from the animal. Derriman came up with the idea of the instrument through his experiences in the South African War as he realised the urgent need of an instrument to secure painless slaughter of horses that were incurably wounded in battle.

The RSPCA advertised Derriman's "Humane Cattle Killer" to butchers as a humane option to the poleaxe. A report on trials of the instrument held in London corporation abattoirs in 1907 by the London County Council and Metropolitan Cattle Markets concluded that "for producing unconsciousness in the ordinary animals used for food we consider it the most efficient, simple and safe appliance we have seen for the use in a slaughter-house". During 1907–1908, the RSPCA gave demonstrations of the instrument at slaughterhouses and were selling it for 40 shillings. The RSPCA stated that they did not aim to make profit out the instrument, the object was to create a weapon which would make the killing process as painless as possible.
