= Charles Rafter =

British police officer (1860–1935)

Sir Charles Rafter KBE OStJ KPM
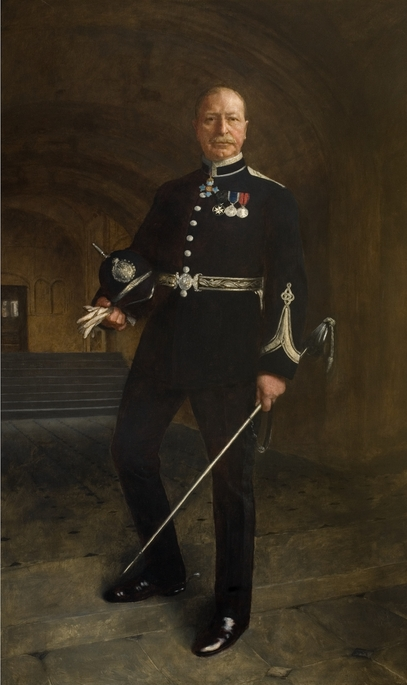
- Oil portrait, 1923, artist unknown. Now in the collection of the West Midlands Police Museum.

Chief Constable of Birmingham City Police
- In office 1899 – 23 August 1935

Personal details
- Born: Charles Haughton Rafter; 1860 Belfast, Ireland
- Died: 23 August 1935 (Age 75) Dennison Hall, Galway, Ireland
- Education: Royal Belfast Academical Institution; Queen's University of Ireland; University of London
- Occupation: Police officer

Sir Charles Haughton Rafter KBE OStJ KPM (1860 – 23 August 1935) was a British police officer who served as Chief Constable of the Birmingham City Police from 1899 until his death in 1935.

== Early life and education ==
Rafter was born in Belfast, the son of William Pearse Rafter (died 1892), a linen merchant, and his wife Elizabeth (née Manning). In September 1870 Rafter entered the Royal Belfast Academical Institution. He later studied at the Queen's University of Ireland and the University of London.

== Royal Irish Constabulary ==
He came top of the entrance examinations for the Royal Irish Constabulary, which he joined as a gentleman cadet in 1882. His first duty was to patrol Phoenix Park, Dublin, nightly, shortly after the murders of Lord Frederick Cavendish, the chief secretary of Ireland, and his under-secretary, Thomas Henry Burke, by Irish republican nationalists. He was later promoted to district inspector, and served for sixteen years, being quartered at various times in Woodford, County Galway, Ballinrobe, County Mayo, Tipperary Town, County Tipperary, and Boyle, County Roscommon. On 13 January 1885, he married Olivia Lucinda (1853–1914), daughter of Arthur Nugent JP, of Crannagh, County Galway.

== Appointment as Chief Constable of Birmingham ==
In July 1899, Rafter was one of fifty candidates who applied to succeed Joseph Farndale as chief constable of Birmingham. Of the eight short-listed candidates for interview, only Rafter appeared in uniform. This impressed the city's watch committee, which unanimously decided to appoint him with a salary of £800. His age was given as forty-two.

Rafter was recommended to the Birmingham watch committee as "skilled in the preservation or restoration of peace in troubled districts where party feeling runs high". This ability was tested early in his time at Birmingham, when the radical Welsh MP David Lloyd George visited the city on 18 December 1901, at the invitation of the Birmingham Liberal Association, to deliver a speech at the town hall critical of the government's conduct during the South African War. Birmingham was the Liberal Unionist stronghold of Joseph Chamberlain, the colonial secretary associated with the war policy, and Rafter anticipated trouble. He ordered 400 officers on duty within the town hall and neighbourhood. A large crowd, armed with stones, brick-ends, and other missiles, stormed the town hall and smashed windows and street lamps in Victoria Square; Rafter personally escorted Lloyd George from the platform to a secure room underneath, from which he enabled the future prime minister to get away safely, disguised, according to some reports, as a police officer. During the melee, a young man, Harold Ernest Curtin, was killed after being struck on the head with a police baton; the coroner's jury returned a verdict of manslaughter by an unknown police constable. A watch committee inquiry absolved Rafter of any blame in the affair.

== Expansion of the force ==
When Rafter was appointed, there were 700 members of the Birmingham force, or one officer for every 654 people, manning fourteen police stations. The annual report of the inspectorate of constabulary that year criticised the Birmingham force for being under strength by 200 officers. In February 1901, Rafter convinced the watch committee to immediately recruit an additional 100 men with an additional annual incremental rise of 20 men for the ensuing six years. Upon his death the force numbered 1,587, or one officer for every 632 people, manning more than 64 stations.

Rafter managed the Birmingham police force during a period of transition. The city's boundaries were extended in 1911 to incorporate the outlying suburbs of Aston Manor, Erdington, Handsworth, Acocks Green, Yardley, King's Norton, and Northfield. The creation of Greater Birmingham, as it was known, trebled the city's acreage to 43,000 acres and increased its population from 523,000 to 840,000, creating new challenges for policing such a large urban area. Rafter formed a large branch of mounted officers attached to several of the outlying districts. Members of county police forces in these districts (214 men) were amalgamated with the Birmingham police. New police stations were built in Nechells, Bordesley Green, and Digbeth, among other districts; existing stations were substantially enlarged to accommodate the new intake of policemen; and the force invested heavily in subsidised housing for its officers. Upon Rafter's death, the gross capital debt on police stations and housing in the city was almost £400,000, a large proportion of which had been borrowed in 1924 to buy land in Steelhouse Lane for the development of a new central station, which was officially opened in December 1933. A citywide network of pillar-post telephones was also installed to facilitate greater communication between the police and members of the public. This was later augmented by a motor patrol fleet and a network of police boxes. In addition to its patrol duties the force's transport department in Duke Street was also responsible for the city's ambulances, prison vans, and mortuary.

== Modernisation of education and training ==
Rafter was a noted moderniser of the service. One of his first acts was to introduce educational classes for the rank-and-file. At first, only Birmingham police officers were eligible to attend, but Rafter soon opened the school to visiting officers, offering a combination of physical and mental education to prepare probationary constables for the rigours of police work. The curriculum included criminal law and procedure, police duties, arithmetic, English composition, dictation, gymnastics, swimming, drill, first aid, and practical tips for dealing with the public. Only with sustained training could officers perform their principal duty, which, as he liked to remind people, was 'the prevention of crime'. Potential recruits were introduced to this educational regime the moment they arrived for interview: all of the 5000 candidates personally interviewed by Rafter between 1899 and 1928 heard his lecture 'Advice to police officers'. As he noted in his evidence to the Royal Commission on Police Powers and Procedure in 1928, the selection of "proper candidates for the Police Service...is a duty that cannot be adequately discharged by subordinates". The Digbeth Police Training School, as it became known from 1913, was the leading educational institution for police officers in the country, and, when Rafter advocated establishing a national police school in 1918, he confidently urged the Home Office to use his school as a model of good practice. From 1918, he used his influence on the Chief Constables' Association to press for greater uniformity and professionalism in police training. With Rafter's encouragement, the rugby-playing assistant chief constable who was his heir apparent from 1918, Cecil Moriarty, wrote and revised a set of model instructions for police, which became a national standard, albeit an unofficial one.

== Women police ==
Rafter was also one of the first chief constables to employ women in the service, first (and conventionally) as police matrons to look after female prisoners and juveniles, before recruiting female volunteers to patrol the city's parks and public spaces during the First World War. A women's police department was formed in June 1917 to deal with cases of indecent exposure, sexual assault, carnal knowledge, attempted suicide, obscene language, and shoplifting. A hostel for young women was opened on Newton Street in the following year with Rafter's sanction. In 1929 the Royal Commission on Police Powers and Procedure praised the force for pioneering the appointment of women police constables. In his evidence to the commission, Rafter had outlined the preventative work of the women police and also noted that they protected male officers from the sort of complaints "readily and glibly made" by "the class of women who usually come into Police custody". By 1935, the women's police department consisted of seventeen female officers, including uniformed and plain-clothes women constables and a woman enquiry officer attached to the detective department, and had its own office in Steelhouse Lane, adjoining the new central station.

== Personal life ==
Although Rafter was a strict disciplinarian, summarily dismissing 107 striking policemen after the national police strike in 1919, he was equally interested in police welfare. A long-distance runner in his youth, he encouraged his men to pursue all forms of rational leisure, including sport, reading, and music. He started an annual police sports' day, which was open to public spectators, and initiated inter-divisional competitions to encourage healthy rivalry among his men. He also started an annual police children's party, at which he could be seen dressed as Father Christmas. Rafter was a lover of music, and was keenly interested in the city police band (which was conducted for a time by Sir Adrian Boult) and the Municipal Officers' Guild Choir. Apparently he kept a flute in his office drawer, which he would sometimes pull out to entertain visitors. He was also a keen horticulturalist and spent much of his later leisure time cultivating hothouse plants and flowers at his Birmingham home, Elmley Lodge, Old Church Road, Harborne. After the death of his first wife, he married, on 21 September 1916 in Plymouth, Catherine (born 1882/3), daughter of Denis Griffin, a naval pensioner.

== Honours and awards ==
Rafter's accomplishments were first recognised in July 1910 with the conferment of the King's Police Medal (KPM), presented by the King at Marlborough House on 2 July, for "a specially distinguished record of administrative service, success in organising his police force, and for special services in dealing with widespread outbreaks of public disorder". He was the first city or borough chief constable to receive the award. He was appointed Commander of the Order of the British Empire (CBE) in the 1920 civilian war honours and Knight Commander of the Order of the British Empire (KBE) in the 1927 Birthday Honours. He was appointed an officer of the Order of St. John of Jerusalem in 1931.

A 1931 portrait photograph, by Walter Stoneman is on the collection of the National Portrait Gallery, London.

== Later career and death ==
When he had completed twenty-five years' service as chief constable, his men presented him with a life-size portrait of himself. Latterly there were moves to force his retirement, and questions were raised both about his age and mental and physical capacity. His appointment had pre-dated legislation on police pensions in 1921 and he was unaffected by its provisions for compulsory retirement. The Birmingham watch committee and the home secretary permitted him to continue in office until his death.

Rafter died at his holiday home, Dennison Hall in Galway, on 23 August 1935, aged 75. One of the longest serving chief constables in the United Kingdom, Rafter was in the police service for almost fifty-three years. His memorial service at St Martin's parish church in Birmingham's Bull Ring attracted a large congregation of prominent citizens and police officers. On the journey to St Peter's Church, Harborne, where his body was interred, the streets were lined by between 800 and 1,000 regular and special constables, the line of blue uniforms being described as "the most impressive guard-of-honour that has ever been seen in Birmingham".

== Family ==
Rafter's two sons, Charles Rafter and William Pearce Haughton 'Robin' Rafter, were both officers with the Royal Air Force. Charles was a pilot officer with 214 Squadron, flying Wellington bombers, and was killed after crashing into a hangar on take-of at RAF Stradishall on 11 October 1940. He was buried next to his father. Robin had volunteered to fly fighter aircraft in the Battle of Britain, having previously flown army co-operation aircraft. He was wounded in action while flying for the first time with 603 Squadron against German fighters on 5 September 1940. After convalescence and attending the funeral of his brother he returned to service, on his next flight he crashed while returning to RAF Hornchurch on 29 November 1940. He was buried next to his father and brother. He also had an elder daughter, Elizabeth.
