= Herefordshire Constabulary =

Defunct police force

Herefordshire Constabulary was the Home Office police force for the county of Herefordshire, England, from 1857 until 1967.

The force was formed in 1857. Following the Police Act 1946 the Hereford Borough Police merged with the Herefordshire force. In 1946 the constabulary bought a large house called Brockington at 35 Hafod Road, Hereford to serve as its headquarters. In 1965, the county force had an establishment of 257 and an actual strength of 221, making it the second smallest county police force in England after West Suffolk Constabulary.

On 1 October 1967, the force amalgamated with Worcestershire Constabulary, Shropshire Constabulary and Worcester City Police to form West Mercia Constabulary.

== Chief Constables ==
- 1857–1895: Captain James Drummond Telfer
- 1895–1923: Captain The Hon. Evelyn Theodore Scudamore-Stanhope
- 1923–1929: Captain Horace Frederick Moncrieff Munro, OBE
- 1929–1958: Freeman Newton, O.B.E. (also Chief Constable of Hereford City)
- 1958–1967: Robert McCartney
