= Birmingham City Police =

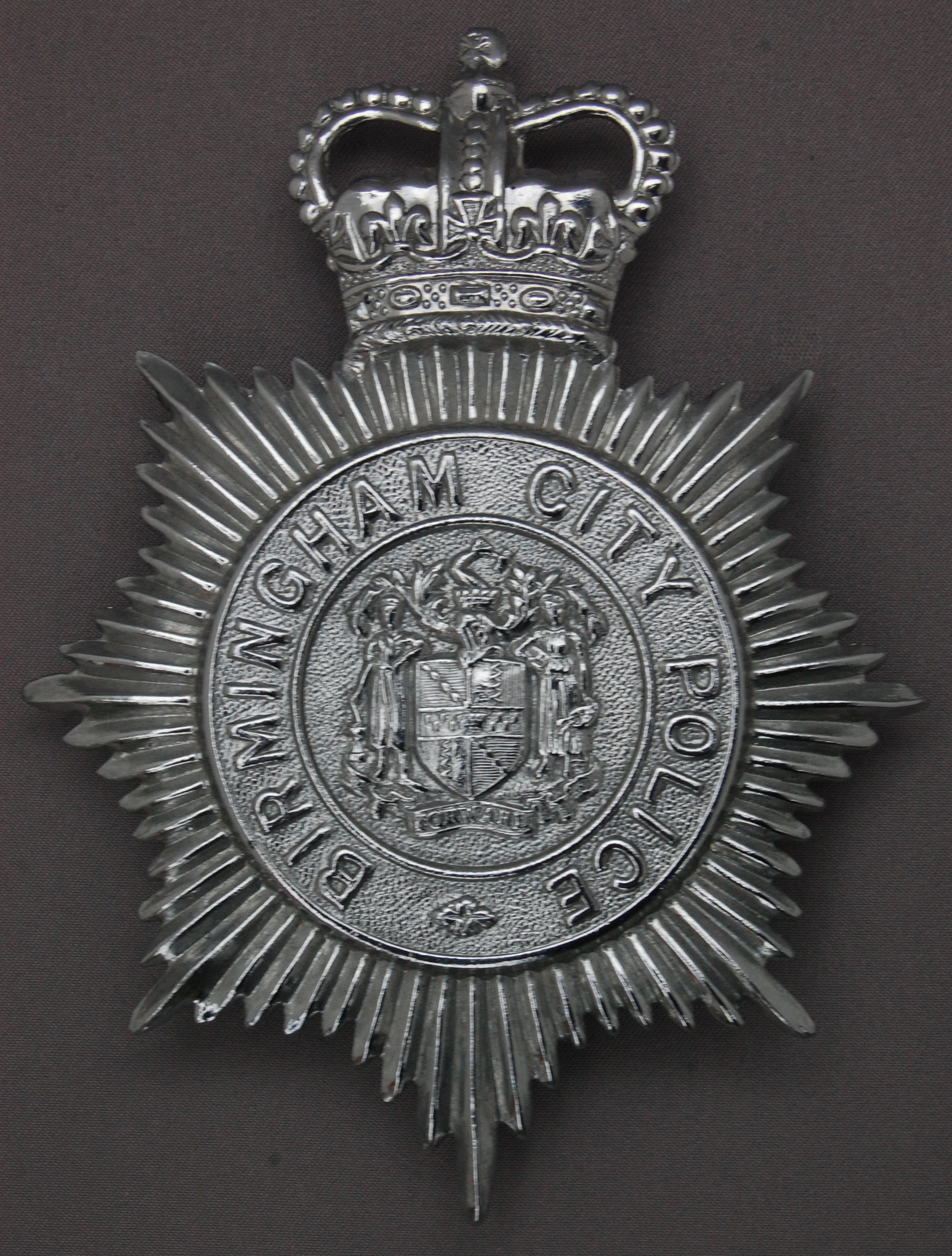
- Hat badge of the type in use on the last day of the service

Agency overview
- Formed: 20 November 1839
- Dissolved: 31 March 1974
- Superseding agency: West Midlands Police

Jurisdictional structure
- Operations jurisdiction: Birmingham, England, UK
- Legal jurisdiction: England & Wales
- General nature: Local civilian police

Operational structure
- Parent agency: Home Office

Birmingham City Police was the police service responsible for general policing in the city of Birmingham from 1839 to 1974. The force was established by a special Act of Parliament in 1839, and was amalgamated as of 1 April 1974 with the West Midlands Constabulary and parts of other forces to form the West Midlands Police by the Local Government Act 1972.

== History ==
=== Early history ===
As early as 1786, watchmen were paid to patrol the streets at night, although this seems to have lapsed on occasion. Special constables were sworn in when required.

In 1800, James Bisset wrote:

In 1789, the Author had the honor, in conjunction with George Simcox, Esq. (now one of our worthy Magistrates), and several Gentlemen in the neighbourhood of St. Paul's, of forming the first Committee, and establishing a Nightly Patrole in that district, for preserving the peace, and securing the property of the inhabitants. The laws and regulations were approved of and soon after adopted throughout the town, which was afterwards divided into 13 districts, each governed by a Committee of their own. The utility and advantages resulting from these Institutions, and the good order and regularity which has since prevailed, in such districts where the Patrole is continued, has fully evinced their beneficial effects; and as one of the Committee always attends the Patrole, in their nocturnal perambulation's, every Member of the Society cheerfully obeys the summons of the Night Constable, whenever it comes to his turn.

In 1812, Joseph Chirm was the "Head Borough Constable".

=== Birmingham Town Police ===
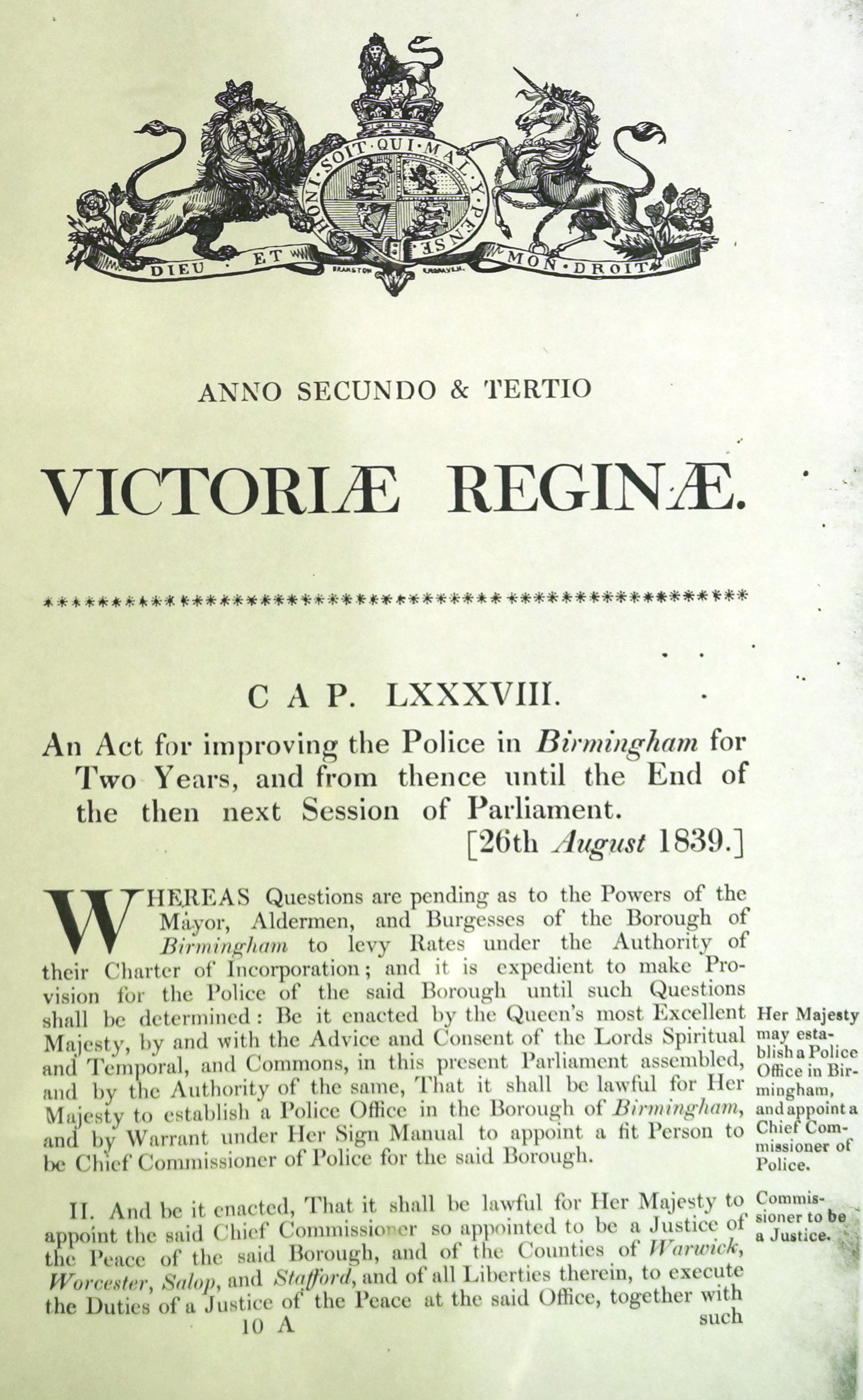
Birmingham Police Act 1839

Birmingham Police Act 1839
- Act of Parliament
- Parliament of the United Kingdom
- Long title: An Act for improving the Police in Birmingham for Two Years, and from thence until the End of the then next Session of Parliament.
- Citation: 2 & 3 Vict. c. 88
- Territorial extent: United Kingdom

Dates
- Royal assent: 26 August 1839
- Commencement: 26 August 1839 (Note: The Acts of Parliament (Commencement) Act 1793.)
- Repealed: 7 August 1874
Other legislation
Repealed by	Statute Law Revision Act 1874 (No. 2)

Status: Repealed

Text of statute as originally enacted

Following Chartist rioting in 1839, when one hundred police had to be brought from London, an Act of Parliament was passed on 26 August 1839 "for improving the Police in Birmingham". Birmingham was required to have at least 250 constables and 50 officers, funded by a rate imposed on the town of Birmingham, but serving all of Warwickshire, Worcestershire and Staffordshire. A commissioner was to be appointed by the Home Secretary and report to him. The Birmingham force came into being on 20 November 1839 with 260 men. Francis Burgess, a local barrister, was appointed as the first police commissioner for Birmingham. On 12 August 1842 a new Police Act transferred responsibility to the Birmingham Town Council and another removed doubts as to the authority of the council. Burgess was succeeded by Richard Stephens, as the first Superintendent of the Birmingham Borough Police.

=== Birmingham City Police ===
When Birmingham became a city in 1889 the town police became the Birmingham City Police.

==== World War I ====
Five hundred and seventy one officers from Birmingham City Police served in the military during World War I, of whom 50 were killed. All 571 are named on a memorial which is located in Lloyd House, the headquarters of the BCP's successor, the West Midlands Police, and on an accompanying website.

== Band ==
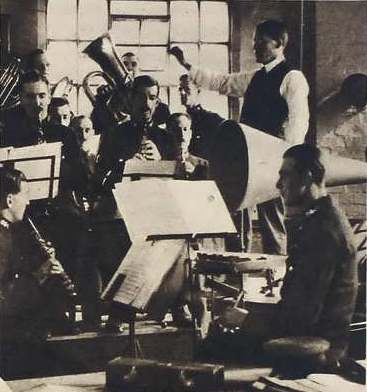
Appleby Matthews conducting a Birmingham Police Band recording session in 1921

The Birmingham City Police Band was, at one period, conducted by Appleby Matthews, organist of the city's St. Philip's Cathedral and the first conductor of the City of Birmingham Orchestra (later the City of Birmingham Symphony Orchestra). Members of the band would sometimes supplement the orchestra's numbers. Subsequently The band was conducted by Richard Wassell, with whom they performed a number of BBC Radio broadcasts.

The City of Birmingham Orchestra held its first-ever rehearsal at 9.30am on 4 September 1920, in the band room at the Birmingham City Police's Steelhouse Lane station.

== Chief Constables ==
Chief Constables of Birmingham City Police (some under other titles) included:

- 1839–1842: Captain Francis Burgess (as "Police Commissioner")
- 1842–1860: Richard Stephens (as "Superintendent")
- 1860–1876: George Glossop
- 1876–1881: Major Edwin Bond
- 1882–1899: Joseph Farndale
- 1899–1935: Sir Charles Haughton Rafter KBE KPM
- 1935–1941: Cecil Charles Hudson Moriarty CBE CStJ
- 1941–1945: Sir William Johnson
- 1945–1963: Edward Dodd, CBE
- 1963–1974: Sir William Derrick Capper
