= West Mercia Police =

English territorial police force

Agency overview
- Formed: 1 October 1967; 59 years ago
- Preceding agencies: Worcestershire Constabulary; Herefordshire Constabulary; Shropshire Constabulary; Worcester City Police
- Employees: 4,195
- Volunteers: 288
- Annual budget: £302 million

Jurisdictional structure
- Operations jurisdiction: Herefordshire, Shropshire, Telford and Wrekin and Worcestershire, England, United Kingdom
- Map of police area
- Area: 7,428 km²/2,868 sqmi
- Population: 1.19 million
- Legal jurisdiction: England and Wales
- Constituting instrument: Police Act 1996
- General nature: Local civilian police

Operational structure
- Overseen by: His Majesty's Inspectorate of Constabulary and Fire & Rescue Services; Independent Office for Police Conduct
- Headquarters: Hindlip Hall, Worcestershire
- PCs: 2,507 (plus 87 special constables)
- PCSOs: 184
- PCC responsible: John Paul Campion (Conservative)
- Agency executive: Richard Cooper, Chief Constable

Facilities
- Police Stations: 48
- Cars: 609
- Vans: 140
- Motorbikes: 37
- Dogs: 40

Website
- www.westmercia.police.uk

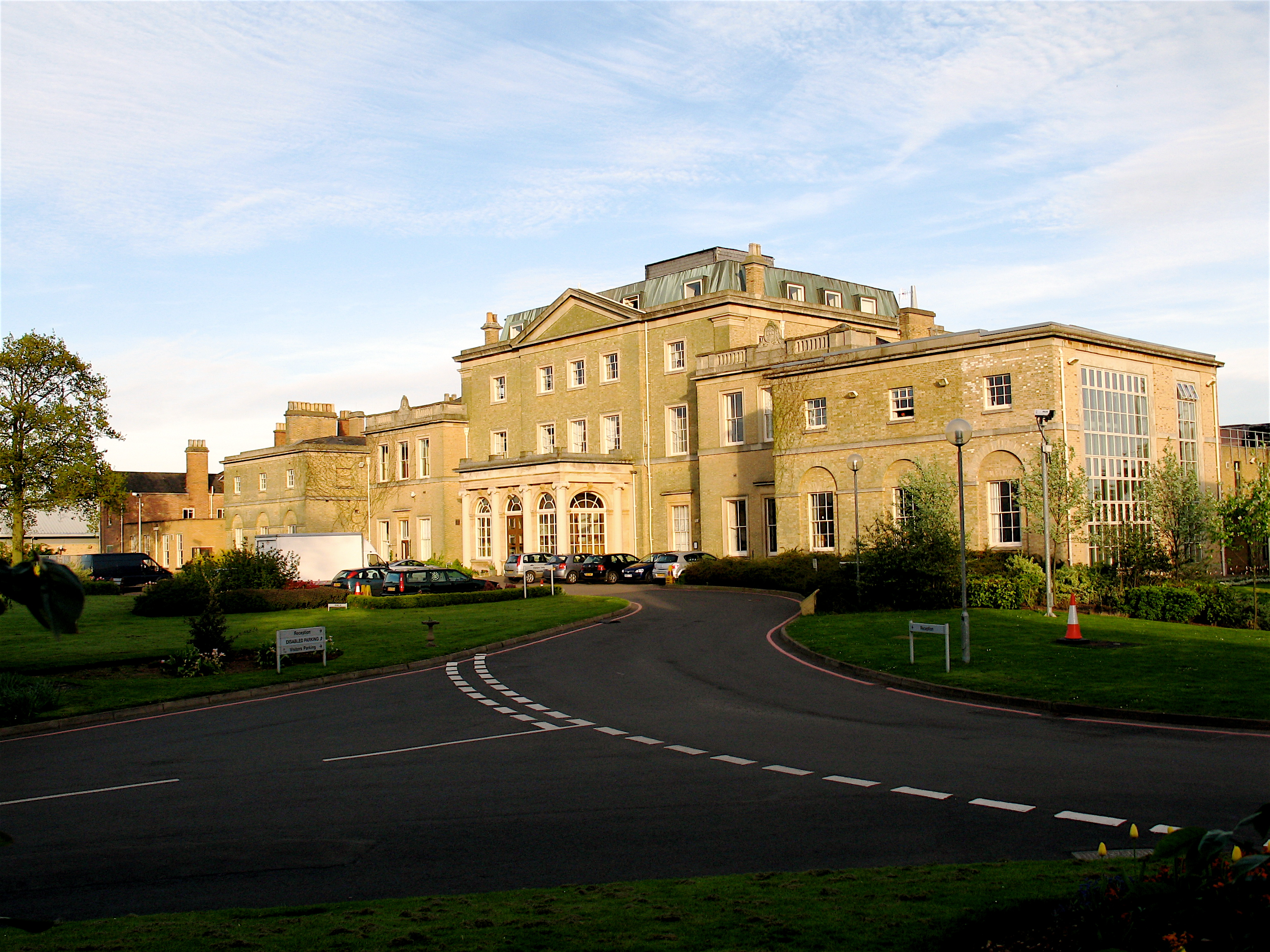
West Mercia Police & Hereford and Worcester fire headquarters at Hindlip Hall

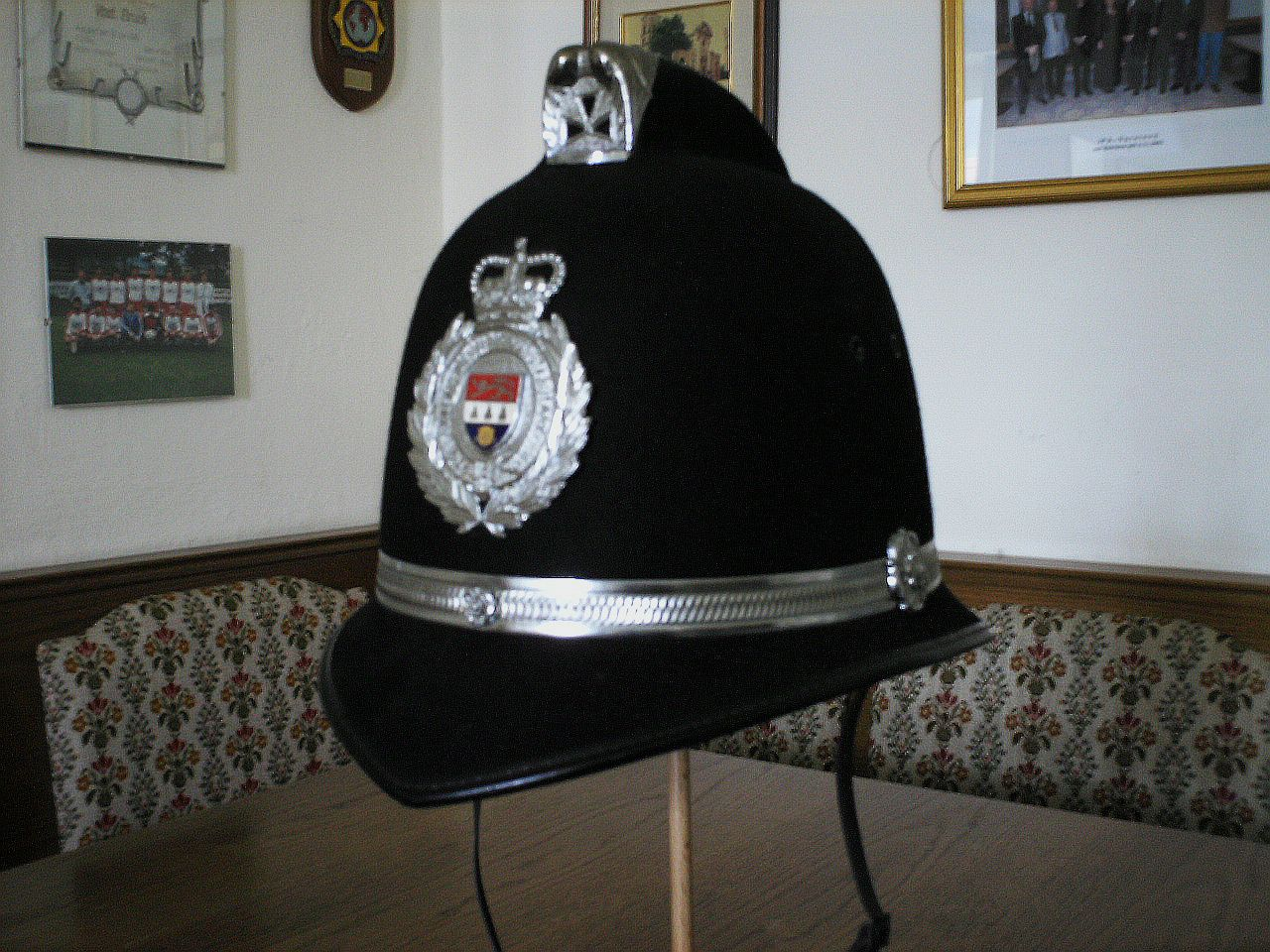
West Mercia Police Helmet

West Mercia Police (/ˈmɜːrsiə/), formerly the West Mercia Constabulary, is the territorial police force responsible for policing the ceremonial counties of Herefordshire, Shropshire and Worcestershire in England. The force area covers 2,868 square miles (7,430 km^{2}) making it the fourth largest by area in England and Wales. The resident population of the area is 1.19 million. Its name comes from the ancient kingdom of Mercia.

The force covers a diverse range of policing environments from densely populated urban areas on the edge of Birmingham, as well as Telford, Shrewsbury, and Worcester, to sparsely populated rural areas, including Herefordshire.

As of December 2025, the force has a workforce of 2,507 police officers, 184 police community support officers, 1,650 police staff and 87 members of the special constabulary.

The force has its headquarters in the historical manor house and grounds of Hindlip Hall on the outskirts of Worcester. Its badge combines the heraldry of Worcestershire, Herefordshire and Shropshire.

== History ==
The force was formed on 1 October 1967, by the merger of the Worcestershire Constabulary, Herefordshire Constabulary, Shropshire Constabulary and Worcester City Police. It lost territory to West Midlands Police when that was constituted on 1 April 1974. It changed its name from "West Mercia Constabulary" to "West Mercia Police" on 5 May 2009.

=== Merger plans ===
In November 2005, the government announced major reforms of policing in England and Wales, including the possibility of mergers. Under final proposals made by the Home Secretary on 6 February 2006, it would merge with Staffordshire Police, Warwickshire Constabulary and West Midlands Police to form a single strategic force for the West Midlands region. The proposals were unpopular with many of the local authorities in the West Mercia area, but was criticised especially strongly by West Mercia Constabulary itself, especially as at the time it was rated the best force in the country. When John Reid became Home Secretary in 2006, he put all merger plans on hold. Subsequent governments have not made any indication of re-introducing such plans.

=== Chief constables ===
- 1967–1975: Sir John Willison
- 1975–1981: Alex Rennie
- 1981–1985: Bob Cozens
- 1985–1991: Anthony Mullett
- 1991–1999: David Cecil Blakey
- 1999–2003: Peter Hampson
- 2003–2011: Paul West
- 2011–2016: David Shaw
- 2016–2021: Anthony Bangham
- 2021–2023: Pippa Mills
- 2023–2024: Alex Murray (temporary)
- 2024–present: Richard Cooper (temporary 2024–2025)

== Organisation ==
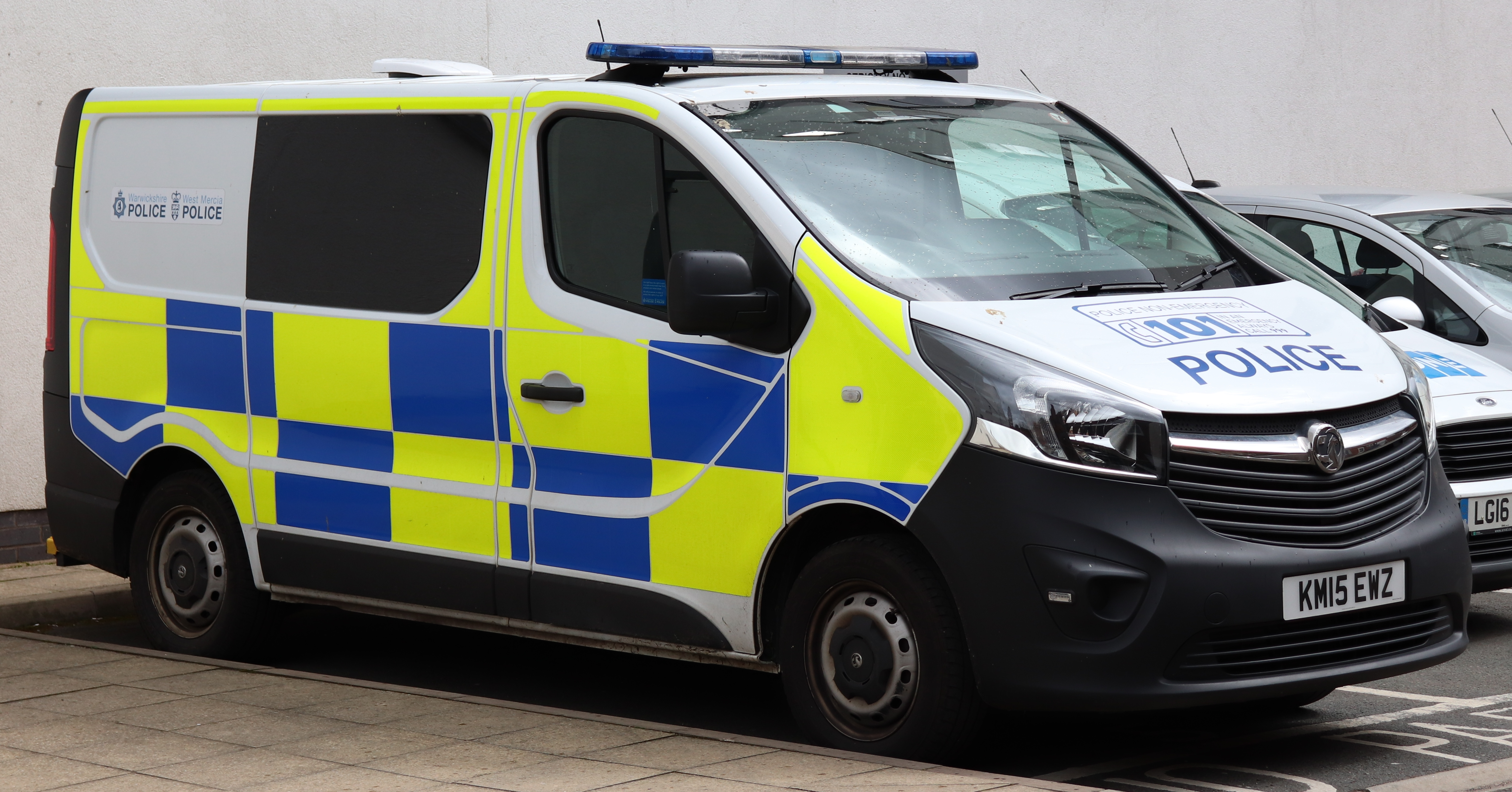
A West Mercia police van with the previous joint West Mercia & Warwickshire livery

West Mercia Police is overseen by an elected West Mercia Police and Crime Commissioner, which replaced the West Mercia Police Authority in 2012.

The force is organised into five Local Policing Units (LPAs), which are alphabetically coded (C, D, E, F, G) by geographical areas. Operating across three counties, West Mercia Police maintains many stations, with each LPA having an HQ Police station. The LPAs are further divided into 82 Safer Neighbourhood Teams (SNT).

== PEEL inspection ==
Her Majesty's Inspectorate of Constabulary and Fire & Rescue Services (HMICFRS) conducts a periodic police effectiveness, efficiency and legitimacy (PEEL) inspection of each police service's performance. In its latest PEEL inspection report (2022), West Mercia Police was rated as follows:

	Outstanding	Good	Adequate	Requires Improvement	Inadequate
2021/22 rating		Preventing crime	Treatment of the public; Protecting vulnerable people; Managing offenders; Developing a positive workplace	Investigating crime; Responding to the public; Good use of resources	

== Volunteer police cadets scheme ==
A volunteer cadet scheme had existed in the Telford division since the early 1990s and in September 2013, the scheme was expanded force-wide, creating a new detachment of police cadets in each Territorial Policing Unit area. Each detachment is headquartered in the respective TPU HQ, except the South Worcestershire detachment, which is based at Tudor Grange Academy.

In 2010, the Telford Cadets Detachment was awarded The Queen's Award for Voluntary Service.

According to West Mercia Police's website, "The scheme is aimed at young people who wish to engage in a program that offers them an opportunity to gain a practical understanding of policing, develop their spirit of adventure and good citizenship, while supporting their local policing priorities through volunteering, working with partner agencies and positive participation in their communities."

A new intake of approximately 15 new cadets per detachment occurs annually. New recruits must be aged 16 or over and have finished secondary education. Young people can remain as cadets for up to two years. Cadets can then consider joining the force at age 18, becoming a cadet leader in their detachment, or leaving the scheme altogether.

Each detachment is led by several cadet leaders who are police officers, PCSOs and police volunteers from the force.

== Alliances ==
West Mercia was a partner, alongside three other forces, in the Central Motorway Police Group (CMPG). On 8 April 2018, West Mercia withdrew from the CMPG, with the 25 West Mercia police officers attached to the group returning to the in-force roads policing service.

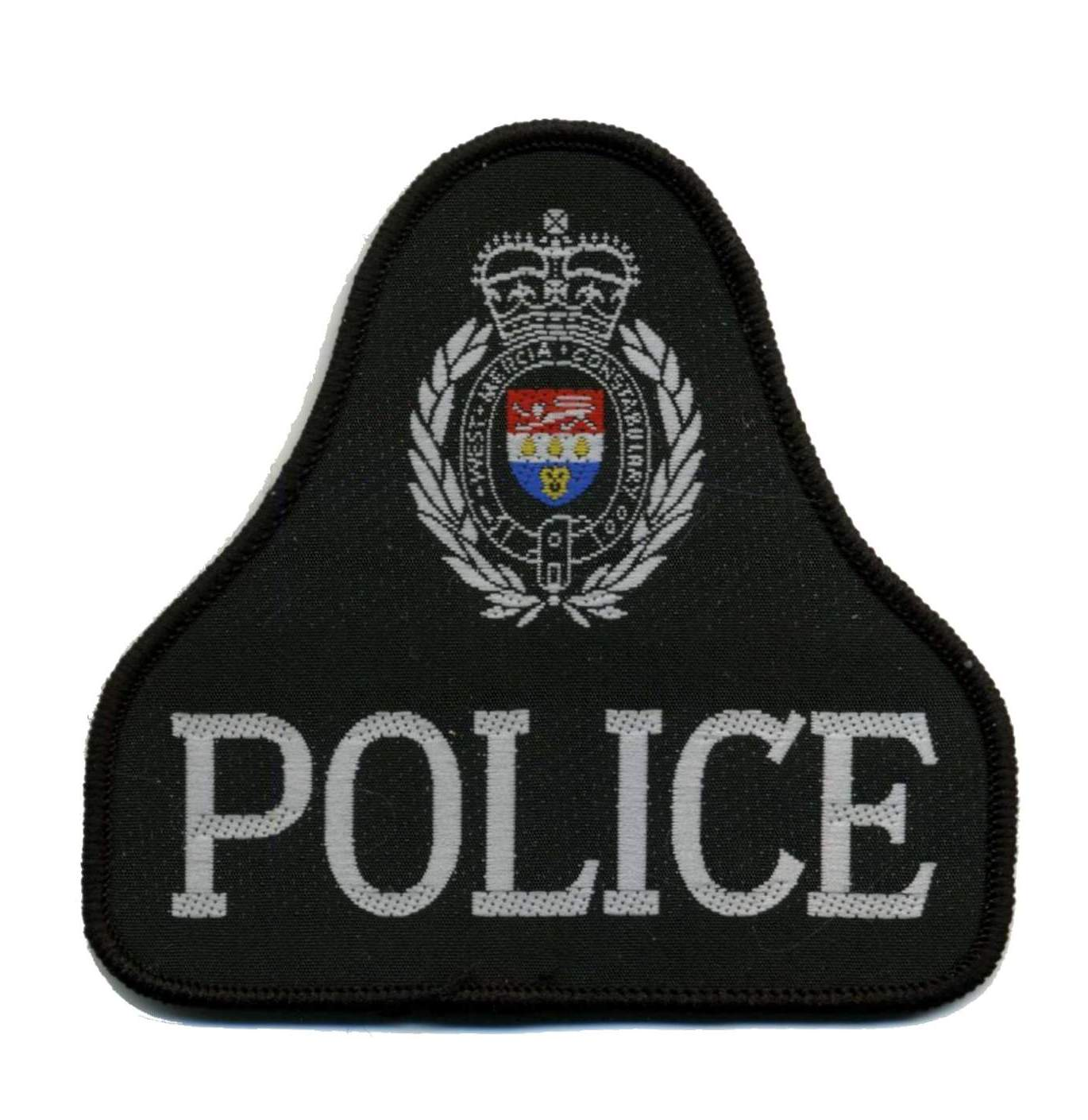
West Mercia Police Patch

In 2013, West Mercia Police and Warwickshire Police formed an alliance, sharing certain administrative functions in order to save both forces money. In October 2018, West Mercia announced its intention to withdraw from the alliance.

== Controversies ==
=== Telford exploitation scandal ===
A 2022 inquiry into the Telford child sexual exploitation scandal – in which all those who were convicted were British Pakistanis – found that "in some cases the decisions of West Mercia Police officers about whether or not to investigate a particular piece of intelligence or complaint were influenced by assumptions about race. Whether because of ideas of difficulties investigating what was seen as a closed and hostile community, because of fear of complaint, or because of concern about the impact an investigation might have had on racial tensions, I cannot determine". The inquiry, chaired by Tom Crowther QC, found that authorities were hesitant to investigate due to concerns about race, and teachers and youth workers were discouraged from reporting Child sexual abuse. This led to a lack of "hard evidence" and allowed offenders to operate with impunity. Despite Operation Chalice in 2013, which resulted in the conviction of seven men for child prostitution offenses, police and council scaled back specialist child sexual exploitation teams. The inquiry echoed findings from national reports on Child sexual abuse in the United Kingdom, highlighting the downplaying of the issue and the tendency to blame children for their abuse.

== See also ==
- List of law enforcement agencies in the United Kingdom, Crown Dependencies and British Overseas Territories
- Law enforcement in the United Kingdom
- Road Policing Unit
- Police cadets in the United Kingdom

== Bibliography ==
- Policing Shropshire 1836–1967 by Douglas J. Elliott. Contains black and white plates, including illustration of badges as a frontispiece.
