= Lloyd House, Birmingham =

Lloyd House
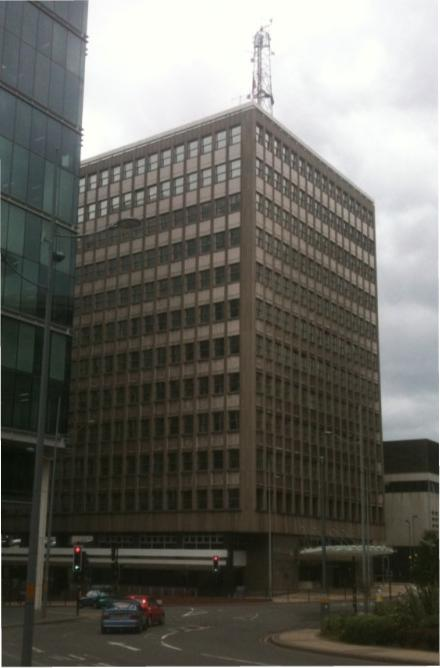
- Interactive map of the Lloyd House area
- Alternative names: Birmingham Central police station

General information
- Type: Tower block
- Location: Snow Hill Queensway, Birmingham, England B4 6NQ, Birmingham, England
- Coordinates: 52.4839°N 1.8975°W
- Construction started: 1960
- Completed: 1964
- Client: Stewarts & Lloyds

Height
- Height: 48.7 metres (160 ft)

Design and construction
- Architects: Kelly and Surman

Lloyd House is the headquarters of the West Midlands Police, the territorial police force responsible for policing the West Midlands metropolitan county in the United Kingdom. The building also houses the office of the West Midlands Police and Crime Commissioner. Since 2017, it has also been the location of Birmingham Central Police Station.

The building sits on Snow Hill Queensway, at the junction with Colmore Circus Queensway and Weaman Street, in Birmingham city centre.

== History ==
Lloyd House was originally constructed between 1960 and 1964 in Birmingham, England, for the steel company Stewarts & Lloyds. The architects were Kelly and Surman. The 13-storey building has roof height of 48.7 metres. Its L-shaped floorplan is 70×30m on its largest sides.

When West Midlands Police was established in 1974, this created the need for a large headquarters. It was agreed that the force would rent the building for this purpose.

On 4 June 2020 Lloyd House was the target of Black Lives Matter protests following the murder of George Floyd in the United States. The protests were peaceful and there were no arrest or reports of disorder.

=== Refurbishment ===
By 2014, Lloyd House was in need of refurbishment, both internally and externally. The work began on 8 September 2014 and lasted until late 2016.
