= West Midlands Police Museum =

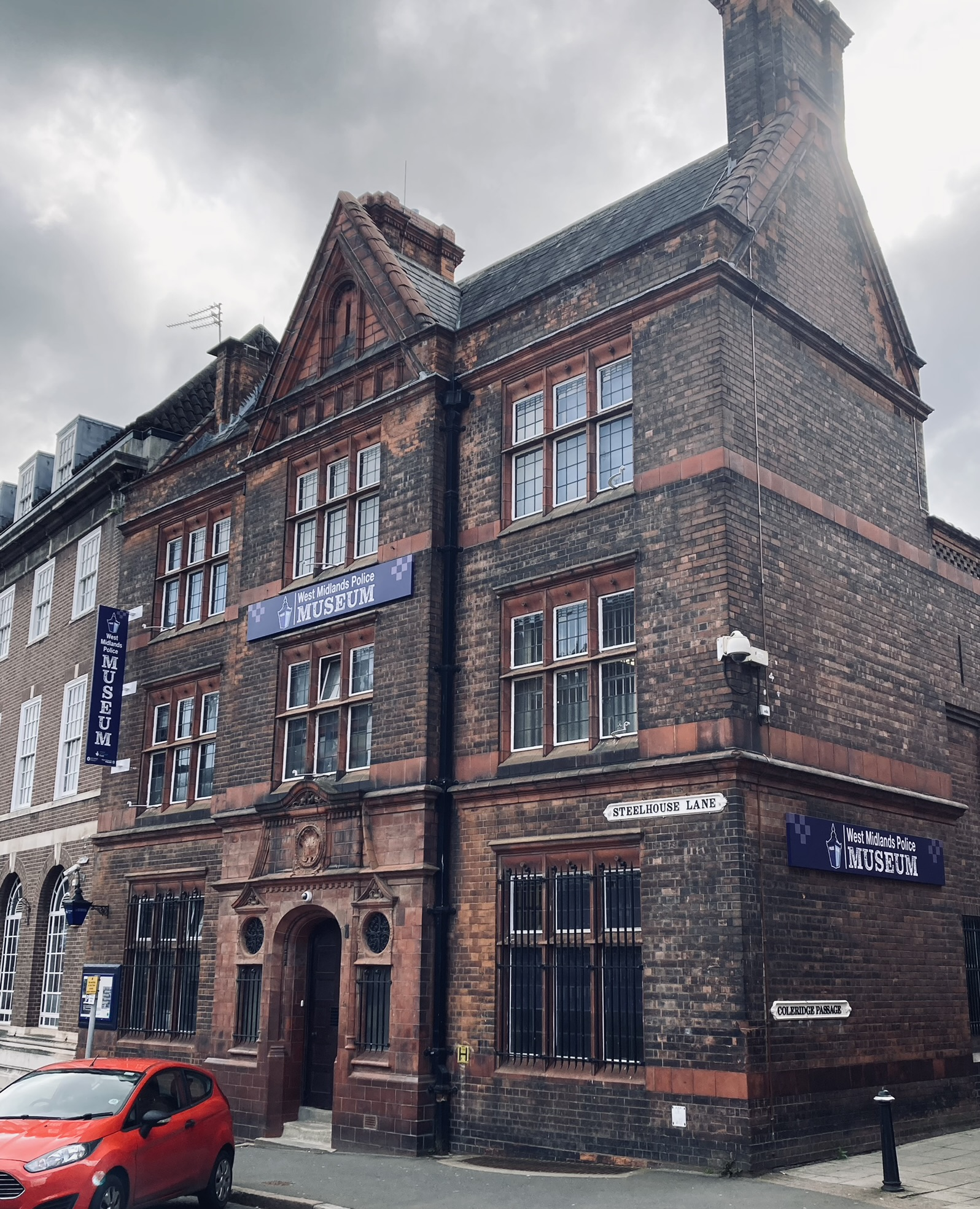
- Location: The Lock-up, Steelhouse Lane, Birmingham, England
- Coordinates: 52.484218°N 1.893699°W
- Type: Police museum
- Collections: Personnel records; Victorian mugshots
- Owner: West Midlands Police
- Website: museum.west-midlands.police.uk

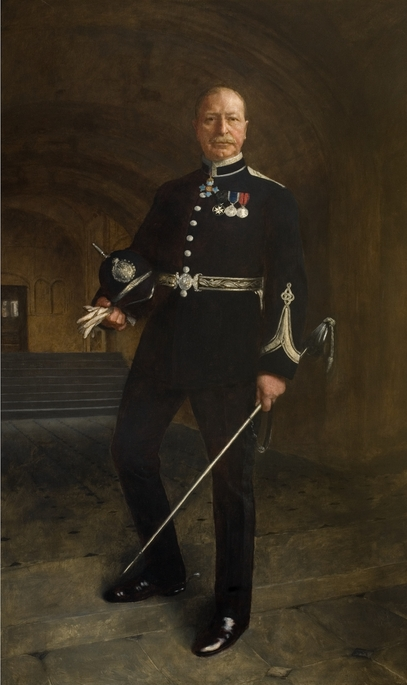
The museum's oil portrait of Sir Charles Horton Rafter, 1923, artist unknown

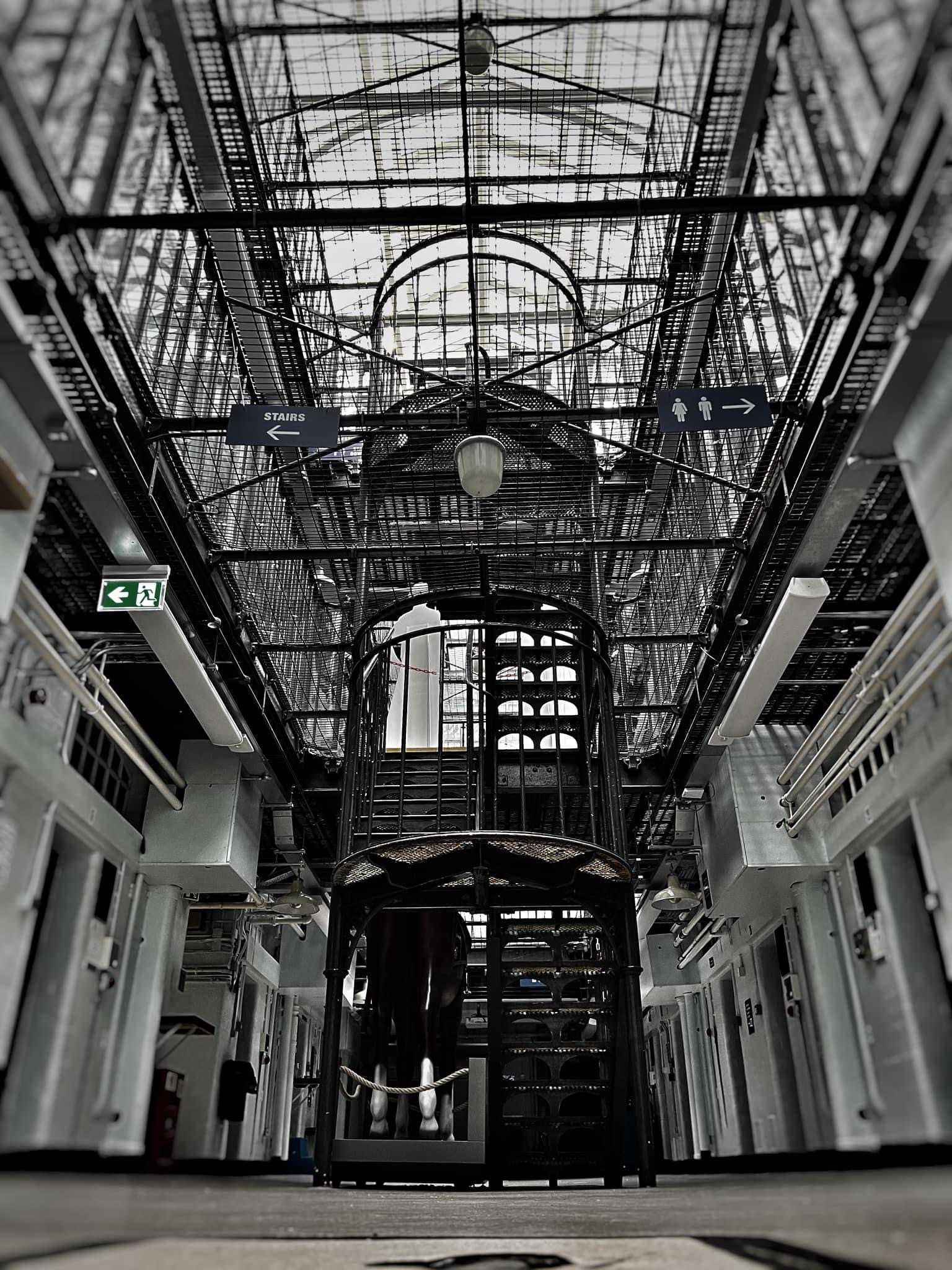
Inside The Lock-up

The West Midlands Police Museum is located in a Victorian cell block on Steelhouse Lane, Birmingham, England, which was operational from 1891 until 2016.

The museum houses artifacts and archives of the West Midlands Police and its predecessors dating back to before the formation of Birmingham City Police in 1839, as well as a small collection of paintings, including a portrait of Sir Charles Haughton Rafter, the longest-serving Chief Constable of Birmingham. The archives contain many records of police officers who served in the area of the present West Midlands Police.

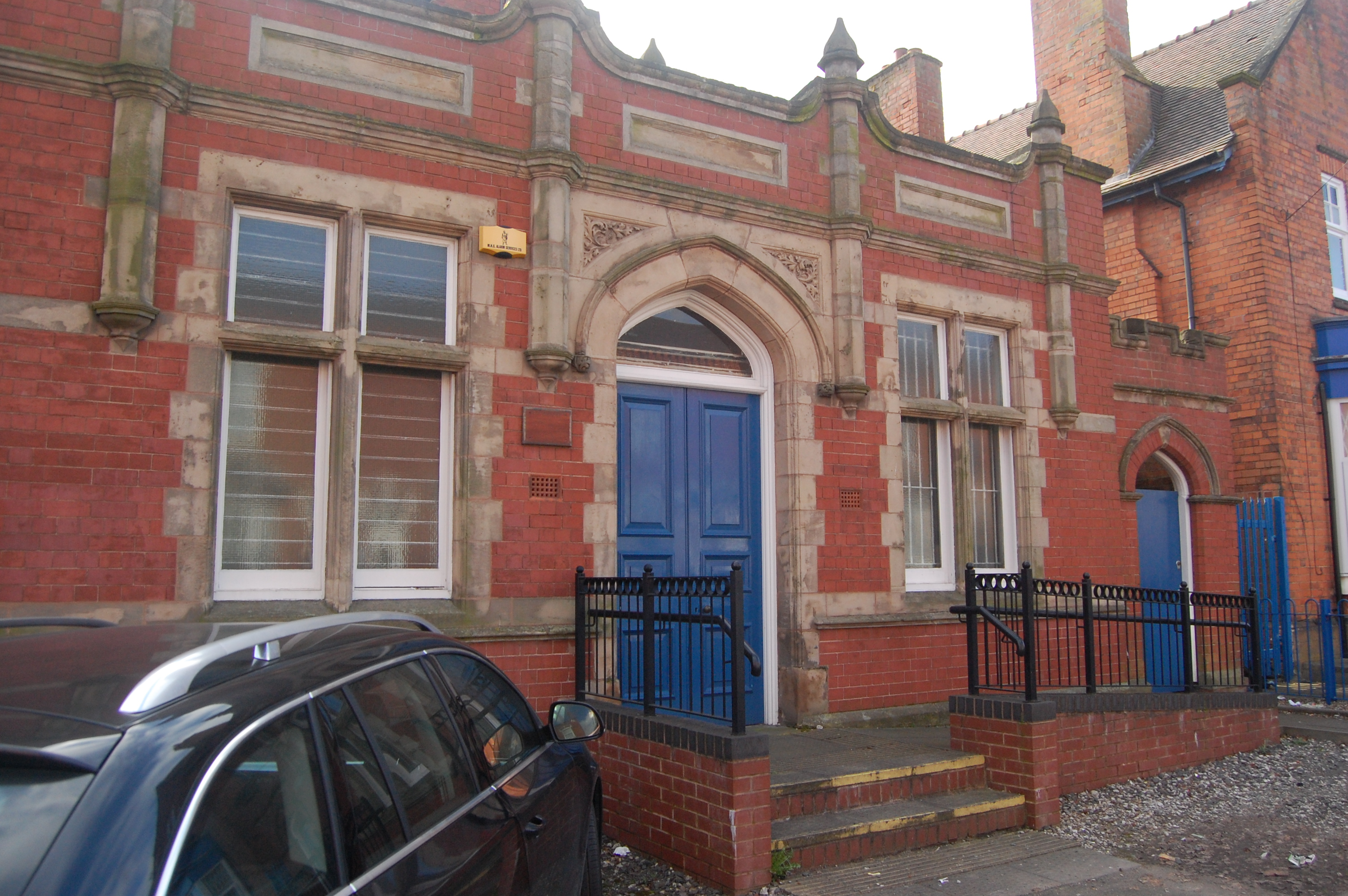
The museum's former location, in Court Road, Sparkhill, Birmingham

The museum re-opened in April 2022 in the Grade II listed Victorian cell block at the former Steelhouse Lane police station following a heritage lottery-funded refurbishment. The collection was previously displayed in a wing of Sparkhill police station, which was formerly a courtroom.

It is one of two museums operated by the West Midlands Police, the other being in Coventry.
