= Worcestershire Constabulary =

Defunct police force

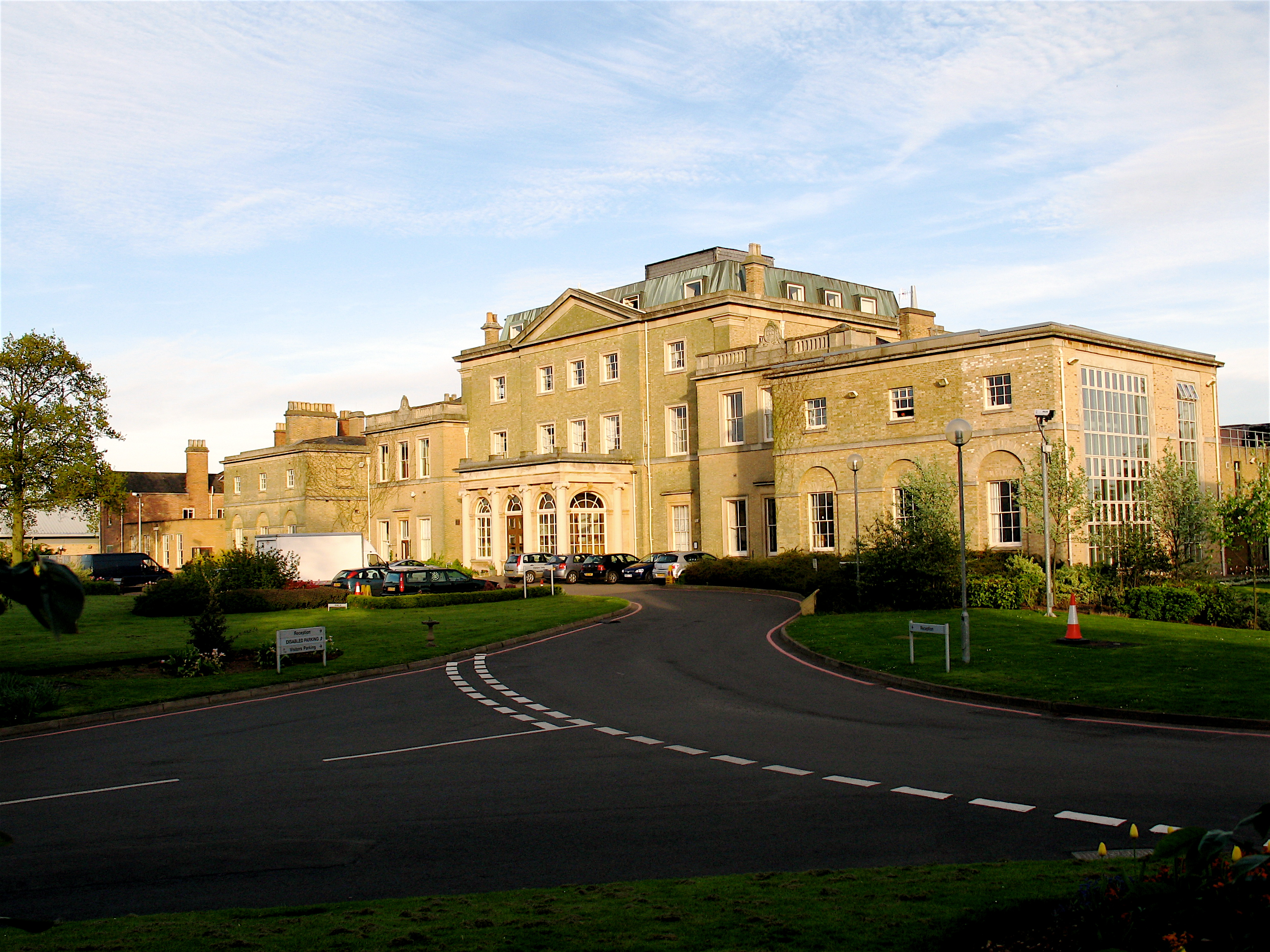
Hindlip Hall- Headquarters of Worcestershire Constabulary from 1946

Worcestershire Constabulary was the territorial police force responsible for policing rural Worcestershire in central England from 1839 until 1967, when it became part of West Mercia Constabulary.

== History ==
The Worcestershire Constabulary was formed in 1839. Other borough forces in the towns of Worcester, Evesham, Kidderminster, Dudley, Bewdley and Droitwich, were already in existence. The first headquarters was a three storey house at 15 Britannia Square, Worcester. In September,1947 they moved into Hindlip Hall.

In 1947 the Worcester Constabulary absorbed Kidderminster Borough Constabulary. On 1 October 1967 the Worcestershire Constabulary was amalgamated with the Shropshire Constabulary, Herefordshire Constabulary and Worcester City Police to form the West Mercia Constabulary, later the West Mercia Police.

== Chief Constables ==
- 1839–1871: Richard Reader Harris
- 1871-1903: Lt.Col. George Lynedoch Carmichael
- 1903–1931: Lt.Col. Herbert Sutherland Walker
- 1931–1958: James Evans Lloyd-Wilson (previously Chief Constable of Montgomeryshire)
- 1958–1967: John Alexander Willison (previously Chief Constable of Berwick, Roxburgh and Selkirk Constabulary) Became first Chief Constable of West Mercia Constabulary.

== See also ==
- List of defunct law enforcement agencies in the United Kingdom
