= John Smith (police officer) =

British police officer (born 1938)

Sir John Alfred Smith QPM (born 21 September 1938) is a retired British police officer with the London Metropolitan Police.

Smith was educated at St Olave's and St Saviour's Grammar School in Orpington, Kent. He served with the Irish Guards from 1959 to 1962 and then joined the Metropolitan Police as a constable. In 1973 he was in charge of the Obscene Publications Squad and by 1979 he was a Detective Chief Superintendent and head of the Drugs Squad at Scotland Yard. In 1980 he was promoted to Commander and took over "P" District in Bromley and Lewisham. In 1981 he transferred to Surrey Constabulary as Deputy Chief Constable, but in 1984, along with David O'Dowd and Wyn Jones, he was one of a trio of young provincial rising stars who were appointed to the rank of deputy assistant commissioner in the Metropolitan Police as part of Commissioner Sir Kenneth Newman's drive for modernisation, being put in charge of the Complaints Investigation Bureau.

In 1985, he joined the Force Inspectorate and Force Reorganisation Team. In August 1987 he was appointed Assistant Commissioner Management Support (ACMS). In 1989, he was shortlisted for the post of Chief Constable of the Royal Ulster Constabulary, but lost out to his colleague Hugh Annesley, and, in March 1990, he was shortlisted for the post of Chief Constable of West Midlands Police, but again lost out to Ronald Hadfield.

In 1989, he did succeed Annesley as Assistant Commissioner Specialist Operations (ACSO). In August 1990 he became HM Inspector of Constabulary for South East England, but in April 1991 returned to the Metropolitan Police once more as Deputy Commissioner, a post he held until his retirement in 1995. As Deputy Commissioner, he introduced a number of reforms, attempting to change police culture by making officers look on themselves as a "service" rather than a "force". He was widely expected to succeed Sir Peter Imbert as Commissioner on his retirement in 1993, but the job went instead to Paul Condon. Smith also served as president of the Association of Chief Police Officers (ACPO) in 1993–1994.

He was awarded the Queen's Police Medal (QPM) in the 1986 New Year Honours and was knighted in the 1994 New Year Honours, unusually while his superior, Commissioner Paul Condon, was not yet a knight (Condon was knighted in the 1994 Birthday Honours). The only other time this has happened was when Deputy Commissioner Colin Woods was knighted in the 1977 Birthday Honours and Commissioner David McNee in the 1978 New Year Honours.

== Footnotes ==
Police appointments
| Preceded by Unknown | Commander ("P" District), Metropolitan Police; 1980–1981 | Succeeded by Unknown |
| Preceded by Unknown | Deputy Chief Constable of Surrey; 1981–1984 | Succeeded by Unknown |
| Preceded by Unknown | Deputy Assistant Commissioner (Complaints Investigation Bureau), Metropolitan Police; 1984–1985 | Succeeded by Unknown |
| Preceded by Unknown | Deputy Assistant Commissioner (Force Inspectorate), Metropolitan Police; 1985–1987 | Succeeded by Unknown |
| Preceded by Colin Sutton | Assistant Commissioner Management Support, Metropolitan Police; 1987–1989 | Succeeded by Peter Winship |
| Preceded by Hugh Annesley | Assistant Commissioner Specialist Operations, Metropolitan Police; 1989–1990 | Succeeded by William Taylor |
| Preceded by Unknown | HM Inspector of Constabulary for SE England; 1990–1991 | Succeeded by Brian Hayes |
| Preceded by Sir John Dellow | Deputy Commissioner of Police of the Metropolis; 1991–1995 | Succeeded by Brian Hayes |
