= Chief police officer =

Most senior officer in a UK police force

In the United Kingdom, a chief police officer is the most senior police officer in a police force. The chief police officers are the 53 Chief Constables, the Commissioner of the City of London Police and the Commissioner of the Metropolitan Police. They are members of the National Police Chiefs' Council.

Through legislation, chief police officers are given powers such as to permit public processions or grant firearms licenses. Some such activities can be delegated to any constable.

== Chief officer rank ==
Officers holding the ranks of assistant chief constable, deputy chief constable, chief constable, and those holding the following ranks in either the Metropolitan Police Service or City of London Police: commander, deputy assistant commissioner, assistant commissioner, the deputy commissioner and the commissioner are also members of the NPCC. These ranks are usually referred to as the "chief officer" ranks, although only the commissioners and chief constables are actual chiefs of a police force.

Each territorial police force outside of London is required to have one or more deputy chief constables and assistant chief constables. These roles are appointed by the chief constable after consulting with their police and crime commissioner. They may exercise the powers of the chief constable when the chief constable when the chief constable gives permission or is unable to exercise their functions.

The Metropolitan Police is required to have one deputy commissioner, which is appointed by the monarch on the recommendation of the home secretary. It must also have one or more assistant commissioners, deputy assistant commissioners, and commanders who are appointed by the commissioner after consulting the Mayor's Office for Policing and Crime.

== See also ==
- Chief of police, a North American title
- Law enforcement in the United Kingdom
- List of law enforcement agencies in the United Kingdom, Crown Dependencies and British Overseas Territories
