= Helen King (police officer) =

British academic administrator and retired police officer

Helen King QPM

Principal of St Anne's College, Oxford
- Incumbent
- Assumed office 24 April 2017
- Preceded by: Tim Gardam

Assistant Commissioner (Professionalism) Metropolitan Police Service
- In office April 2016 – December 2016
- Preceded by: Martin Hewitt
- Succeeded by: Fiona Taylor

Assistant Commissioner (Territorial Policing) Metropolitan Police Service
- In office June 2014 – April 2016
- Preceded by: Simon Byrne
- Succeeded by: Martin Hewitt

Personal details
- Born: 26 April 1965 (age 60) Bishop's Stortford, Hertfordshire, England
- Children: 2
- Education: The Hertfordshire and Essex High School; Perse School for Girls
- Alma mater: St Anne's College, Oxford; University of Manchester; University of Cambridge

Helen Mary King QPM (born 26 April 1965) is a British academic administrator and retired police officer. Since April 2017, she has been Principal of St Anne's College, Oxford. Her previous career was as a police officer, serving with the Cheshire Constabulary, the Merseyside Police, and the Metropolitan Police Service. She retired from the police in 2017, having reached the rank of Assistant Commissioner.

== Early life and education ==
King was born on 26 April 1965 in Bishop's Stortford, Hertfordshire, England. She is the daughter of Robert King, a senior civil servant, and Mary King (née Rowell). She was educated at The Hertfordshire and Essex High School, then an all-girls comprehensive school in Bishop's Stortford, and at the Perse School for Girls, a private school in Cambridge, Cambridgeshire. In 1983, she matriculated into St Anne's College, Oxford, to study Philosophy, Politics and Economics (PPE). She graduated from the University of Oxford in 1986 with a lower second class (2:2) Bachelor of Arts (BA) degree.

King continued her studies in later life. In 1994, she completed a Master of Arts degree at the University of Manchester. In 2003, she completed a postgraduate diploma at the University of Cambridge.

== Career ==
=== Police career ===
In 1986, King joined Cheshire Constabulary as part of the Graduate Entry Scheme. Over her time serving with Cheshire, she rose from the most junior rank of constable to chief superintendent, and worked as both a uniformed officer and as a detective with the Criminal Investigation Department (CID).

In 2005, King was appointed an assistant chief constable of Merseyside Police, thereby becoming a chief officer. From 2007 to 2012, she was additionally the Association of Chief Police Officers (ACPO) lead for "cash and valuables in transit attacks". She took over the operations portfolio of Merseyside Police in 2009 and as such became responsible for Merseyside's six policing areas.

In April 2012, King moved back to Cheshire Constabulary, having been appointed its deputy chief constable, and as such was "responsible for performance management, governance, standards and communications". From 2012 to 2014, she was additionally the national policing lead for horizon scanning; GOV.UK states "Horizon scanning helps government to analyse whether it is adequately prepared for potential opportunities and threat".

In June 2014, King joined the Metropolitan Police Service as assistant commissioner for territorial policing. As such, she had "oversight of policing in London's 32 Boroughs". In April 2016, she was appointed assistant commissioner for professionalism and as such oversaw training and professional standards. In October 2016, it was announced that she would be retiring from the police to take up a position at the University of Oxford in 2017. She stepped down as assistant commissioner for professionalism in December 2016.

=== Academic career ===
In October 2016, it was announced that King had been elected the next Principal of St Anne's College, Oxford; she is the first police officer to head an Oxbridge college. She took up the appointment on 24 April 2017.

== Personal life ==
King was previously married but is now divorced. She has two daughters.

== Honours ==
In the 2011 New Year Honours, King was awarded the Queen's Police Medal (QPM) in recognition of her service as an Assistant Chief Constable of Merseyside Police.

Ribbon	Description	Notes
	Queen's Police Medal (QPM)	2011 New Year Honours.
	Queen Elizabeth II Golden Jubilee Medal	2002; UK Version of this Medal
	Queen Elizabeth II Diamond Jubilee Medal	2012; UK Version of this Medal
	Police Long Service and Good Conduct Medal	
