= Assistant Commissioner of Police of the Metropolis =

Senior English law-enforcement rôle

Met Assistant Commissioner Epaulette

Assistant Commissioner of Police of the Metropolis, usually just Assistant Commissioner (AC), is the third highest rank in London's Metropolitan Police, ranking below Deputy Commissioner and above Deputy Assistant Commissioner. There have usually been four officers in the rank; however, at times there have been five to seven. As of June 2026, there are seven owing to the continuing secondments of Sir Stephen Kavanagh to Interpol, and Pippa Mills and Louisa Rolfe to the National Police Chiefs' Council.

From 1 September 2016, the salary is £198,823 (plus £2,373 allowance). This does not include the use of a private car and pension contributions. This makes them the equal fifth highest paid police officers in the United Kingdom, behind the commissioner, the deputy commissioner, the chief constable of Police Scotland and the chief constable of the Police Service of Northern Ireland, and alongside the chief constables of West Midlands and Greater Manchester.

== 19th century ==
The rank of assistant commissioner was introduced by the Police Act 1856, which abolished the two joint commissioners and established a single Commissioner (Sir Richard Mayne) assisted by two assistant commissioners. The Assistant Commissioner (Administrative) was in charge of administration and discipline. The Assistant Commissioner (Executive) was in charge of executive business, supplies and buildings. The first two men to fill these posts were Lieutenant-Colonel Douglas Labalmondière and Captain William C. Harris, respectively. A third was added by the Metropolitan Police Act 1884.

Like the Commissioner, the assistant commissioners were sworn as justices of the peace, although they could not try criminal cases. This continued until 1973. Like the Commissioner, the assistant commissioners were mainly appointed from outside the police until well into the 20th century, although career police officers could and sometimes did rise to the rank.

In 1878, Howard Vincent was appointed Director of Criminal Intelligence, a post that had equal rank to the assistant commissioners, but not the title. On his resignation in 1884, his post was replaced by a third assistant commissioner, the Assistant Commissioner (Crime).

== Lettered departments ==
Realising that the assistant commissioners' workload was becoming too great, Commissioner Sir Edward Henry was allowed by the Police Act 1909 to add a fourth assistant commissioner, who took over some of the duties of the Assistant Commissioner (Executive). The four became known as Assistant Commissioners "A", "B", "C" and "L", heading departments with the same letter designations. Assistant Commissioner "A" in effect acted as Deputy Commissioner until 1931, when a separate Deputy Commissioner was appointed. From 1922 to 1931, Assistant Commissioner "A" was generally known as the Deputy Commissioner.

After World War I, Assistant Commissioner "B" became responsible solely for traffic and lost property, with his other former duties divided between Assistant Commissioners "A" and "L". Assistant Commissioner "L" was responsible for "L" (Legal) Department until its reorganisation in 1931. After 1931, he was renamed Assistant Commissioner "D" and became responsible for policy and planning.

By the end of World War II, Assistant Commissioner "A" (Operations and Administration) was responsible for all uniformed police, including specialist units, except traffic police, which were under Assistant Commissioner "B" (Traffic). Assistant Commissioner "C" (Crime) headed the Criminal Investigation Department (CID), and Assistant Commissioner "D" (Personnel and Training) was responsible for recruitment, training, welfare, communications and police dogs. In 1970, Commissioner Sir John Waldron designated Assistant Commissioner "D" as the senior Assistant Commissioner. As policing became more technical, Assistant Commissioner "B" also became responsible for technical support.

== Reorganisation in the 1980s and 1990s ==
In 1985, Commissioner Sir Kenneth Newman finally abolished the system of lettered departments. He redesignated the four assistant commissioners as:

- Assistant Commissioner Territorial Operations (ACTO), in charge of all uniformed and CID units based on the divisions;
- Assistant Commissioner Specialist Operations (ACSO), in charge of all specialised and centralised uniformed and CID units;
- Assistant Commissioner Personnel and Training (ACPT), in charge of all personnel issues, including recruitment, training and welfare; and
- Assistant Commissioner Management Support (ACMS), in charge of strategic planning, management services, public relations and a number of other miscellaneous departments.

In 1992, with increasing focus on the Met's image and quality of service, Commissioner Sir Peter Imbert redesignated the ACMS as Assistant Commissioner Inspection and Review (ACIR), in charge of collecting performance data from across the Metropolitan Police District.

In 1995, Commissioner Sir Paul Condon introduced the widest-ranging reorganisation when he increased the number of assistant commissioners to six. The previous eight Areas, each commanded by a deputy assistant commissioner (DAC), were reduced to five, each commanded by an assistant commissioner, designated AC 1 to 5. Each assistant commissioner also had force-wide responsibility for a "portfolio" (such as crime or traffic), setting force policy and managing related headquarters branches. ACSO remained outside the area system and continued to manage the Specialist Operations units.

== Organisation restructuring in the 21st century ==
In 2000, the system changed again, with policing restructured around the boroughs and the areas being abolished. The six assistant commissioners were reduced to four again. With the creation of the Specialist Crime Directorate under its own assistant commissioner in 2002, there were five assistant commissioners, although this was once again reduced to four in 2008. In 2011, the number was briefly increased to five again, then reduced to four once more. The posts have held varying designations since 2000, with the ACSO being the only post to have remained since the initial reorganisation in 1985.

The assistant commissioners are considered to hold equal rank to the chief constables of other British police forces and wear the same rank insignia: a crown over crossed tipstaves in a wreath.

== Assistant Commissioners from 1856 to 1985 ==
These positions existed concurrently.

=== Assistant Commissioner "A" ===
- Lieutenant-Colonel Douglas Labalmondière, 1856–1884
- Sir Alexander Carmichael Bruce, 1884–1914
- Frank Elliott, 1914–1918
- Brigadier-General William Horwood, 1918–1920
- Sir James Olive, 1920–1925
- Vice-Admiral Sir Charles Royds, 1926–1931
- Sir Trevor Bigham, 1931
- Lieutenant-Colonel David Allan, 1931
- Brigadier James Whitehead, 1933–1938
- Lieutenant-Colonel John Carter, 1938–1940
- John Nott-Bower, 1940–1945
- Major John Ferguson, 1945–1946
- Major Sir Philip Margetson, 1946–1957
- Alexander Robertson, 1957–1958
- Douglas Webb, 1958–1961
- Lieutenant-Colonel Ranulph Bacon, 1961–1963
- Sir John Waldron, 1963–1966
- John Hill, 1966–1968
- Andrew Way, 1968–1969
- James Starritt, 1970–1972
- John Mastel, 1972–1976
- Wilford Gibson, 1977–1984
- Geoffrey Dear, 1984–1985

=== Assistant Commissioner "B" ===
- Captain William C. Harris, 1856–1881
- Lieutenant-Colonel Richard Pearson, 1881–1890
- Sir Charles Howard, 1890–1902
- Major Sir Frederick Wodehouse, 1902–1918
- Frank Elliott, 1918–1931
- Sir Alker Tripp, 1932–1947
- Sir Henry Dalton, 1947–1956
- Joseph Simpson, 1956–1957
- Douglas Webb, 1957–1958
- John Waldron, 1958–1963
- Andrew Way, 1963–1968
- Robert Mark, 1968
- James Starritt, 1968–1970
- Colin Woods, 1970–1972
- Henry Hunt, 1972–1974
- Patrick Kavanagh, 1974–1977
- Jock Wilson, 1977–1982
- John Dellow, 1982–1984
- Colin Sutton, 1984–1985

=== Assistant Commissioner "C" ===
- James Monro, 1884–1888
- Sir Robert Anderson, 1888–1901
- Edward Henry, 1901–1903
- Sir Melville Macnaghten, 1903–1913
- Sir Basil Thomson, 1913–1921
- Major-General Sir Wyndham Childs, 1921–1928
- Sir Trevor Bigham, 1928–1931
- Sir Norman Kendal, 1931–1945
- Ronald Howe, 1945–1953
- Sir Joe Jackson, 1953–1963
- Lieutenant-Colonel Sir Ranulph Bacon, 1963–1966
- Peter Brodie, 1966–1972
- Colin Woods, 1972–1975
- Jock Wilson, 1975–1977
- Gilbert Kelland, 1977–1984
- John Dellow, 1984–1985

=== Assistant Commissioner "L" ===
- Frederick Bullock, 1909–1914
- Trevor Bigham, 1914–1928
- Norman Kendal, 1928–1931

=== Assistant Commissioner "D" ===
- Major Maurice Tomlin, 1932–1933
- Lieutenant-Colonel Sir Percy Laurie, 1933–1936
- Sir George Abbiss, 1936–1946
- Major Philip Margetson, 1946
- Colonel Arthur Young, 1947–1950
- Brigadier John Rymer-Jones, 1950–1959
- Tom Mahir, 1959–1967
- Robert Mark, 1967–1968
- John Hill, 1968–1972
- John Mastel, 1972
- John Alderson, 1973
- Henry Hunt, 1974–1978
- John Gerrard, 1978–1981
- Geoffrey Dear, 1981–1984
- Geoffrey McLean, 1984–1985

== Assistant Commissioners from 1985 ==
These were not all concurrently existing positions.

=== Areas ===
==== Assistant Commissioner Central Area (1) ====
- Tony Speed, 1994–1999

==== Assistant Commissioner North-West Area (2) ====
- Bill Skitt, 1994–1997
- Anderson Dunn, 1997–2000

==== Assistant Commissioner North-East Area (3) ====
- Anderson Dunn, 1994–1997
- Paul Manning, 1997–2000

==== Assistant Commissioner South-East Area (4) ====
- Ian Johnston, 1994–2000

==== Assistant Commissioner South-West Area (5) ====
- Paul Manning, 1994–1997
- Denis O'Connor, 1997–2000

=== Portfolios ===
==== Current ====
===== Assistant Commissioner Frontline Policing =====
- Martin Hewitt, 2018
- Mark Simmons, 2018–2020
- Nick Ephgrave, 2020–2022
- Louisa Rolfe, 2022–2024
- Matt Twist, 2024–present

===== Assistant Commissioner Met Operations =====
- Sir Stephen House, 2018
- Nick Ephgrave, 2018–2020
- Louisa Rolfe, 2020–2022
- Matt Twist, 2023–2024 (temporary 2022–2023)
- Pippa Mills, 2024–2026
- Ade Adelekan, 2026–present (initially acting; now temporary)

===== Assistant Commissioner Professionalism =====
- Martin Hewitt, 2014–2016
- Helen King, 2016–2017
- Fiona Taylor, 2017 (temporary)
- Helen Ball, 2017–2021
- Amanda Pearson, 2021–2022 (temporary)
- Barbara Gray, 2022–2024
- Laurence Taylor, 2024–2025 (temporary)
- Rachel Williams, 2025–present

===== Assistant Commissioner Specialist Operations =====
- John Dellow, 1985–1987
- Hugh Annesley, 1987–1989
- John Smith, 1989–1990
- William Taylor, 1990–1994
- Sir David Veness, 1994–2005
- Andy Hayman, 2005–2007
- Peter Clarke, 2008 (acting)
- Bob Quick, 2008–2009
- John Yates, 2009–2011
- Cressida Dick, 2011–2014
- Mark Rowley, 2014–2018
- Neil Basu, 2018–2021
- Matt Jukes, 2021–2025
- Vicki Evans, 2025 (temporary)
- Laurence Taylor, 2025–present

===== Assistant Commissioner (seconded to the National Police Chiefs' Council) =====
- Pippa Mills, 2026–present
- Louisa Rolfe, 2026–present

===== Assistant Commissioner (seconded to Interpol) =====
- Stephen Kavanagh, 2020–present

==== Lapsed or merged ====
===== Assistant Commissioner (seconded to the National Police Chiefs' Council) =====
- Martin Hewitt, 2019–2023

===== Assistant Commissioner Central Operations =====
- Stephen House, 2005–2006
- Tarique Ghaffur, 2006–2008
- Chris Allison, 2008–2010
- Lynne Owens, 2010–2011

===== Assistant Commissioner Central Operations and Specialist Crime =====
- Lynne Owens, 2011
- Mark Rowley, 2011–2014

===== Assistant Commissioner COVID-19 response =====
- Mark Simmons, 2020

===== Assistant Commissioner Human Resources =====
- Bernard Hogan-Howe, 2001–2004

===== Assistant Commissioner Inspection and Review =====
- Peter Winship, 1992–1995

===== Assistant Commissioner Management Support =====
- Colin Sutton, 1985–1987
- John Smith, 1987–1989
- Peter Winship, 1989–1992

===== Assistant Commissioner Olympics and Paralympics =====
- Chris Allison, 2011–2013

===== Assistant Commissioner Operation Resolve (seconded to the Home Office) =====
- Jon Stoddart, 2012–2016
- Rob Beckley, 2016–2024

===== Assistant Commissioner Operational Services =====
- John Yates, 2007
- Alf Hitchcock, 2007–2008 (acting)

===== Assistant Commissioner Personnel and Training =====
- Hugh Annesley, 1985–1987
- Colin Sutton, 1987–1988
- Wyn Jones, 1989–1993

===== Assistant Commissioner Policy, Review and Standards =====
- Michael J. Todd, 2000–2001
- Tarique Ghaffur, 2001–2002

===== Assistant Commissioner Professional Standards and Intelligence =====
- John Yates, 2006–2007

===== Assistant Commissioner Service Improvement =====
- Alan Brown, 2005–2006

===== Assistant Commissioner Specialist Crime =====
- Tarique Ghaffur, 2002–2006
- Stephen House, 2006–2007
- John Yates, 2007–2009
- Cressida Dick, 2009–2011

===== Assistant Commissioner Specialist Crime and Operations =====
- Cressida Dick, 2014–2015
- Pat Gallan, 2015–2018

===== Assistant Commissioner Strategic Development =====
- Anderson Dunn, 2000–2001

===== Assistant Commissioner Territorial Operations =====
- Geoffrey McLean, 1985–1990
- Robert Hunt, 1991–1995

===== Assistant Commissioner Territorial Policing =====
- Ian Johnston, 2000–2001
- Michael J. Todd, 2001–2003
- Tim Godwin, 2003–2009
- Rose Fitzpatrick, 2009 (temporary)
- Ian McPherson, 2009–2011
- Simon Byrne, 2011–2014
- Helen King, 2014–2016
- Martin Hewitt, 2016–2018

===== Assistant Commissioner Transformation =====
- Matt Jukes, 2020–2021

===== Assistant Commissioner Trust and Legitimacy =====
- Pippa Mills, 2023–2024
- Rachel Williams, 2024–2025 (temporary)
