= Hugh Annesley =

Hugh Annesley may refer to:

- Hugh Annesley, 5th Earl Annesley (1831–1908), British Army officer and Member of Parliament
- Hugh Annesley (police officer) (born 1939), Senior police officer in the Royal Ulster Constabulary
