= Bill Skitt =

British police officer

Bill Skitt CBE BEM QPM

Assistant Commissioner Area No. 2 (North-West Area), Metropolitan Police
- In office 1994–1997

Chief Constable of Hertfordshire
- In office 1990–1994

Deputy Chief Constable of Northamptonshire
- In office 1986–1990

Commandant of Hendon Police College
- In office 1984–1986

Personal details
- Born: Baden Henry Skitt; 5 December 1941 Cannock, Staffordshire, England
- Died: 7 December 2016 (aged 75)

Baden Henry Skitt CBE BEM QPM (5 December 1941 – 7 December 2016), known as Bill Skitt, was a British police officer.

== Early life, education and teaching career ==
Skitt was born in Cannock, Staffordshire, the son of Frederick Albert Skitt and his wife Laura Kathleen (née Oakley). He was educated at Rugeley Grammar School and St Paul's College of Education, Cheltenham, where he qualified as a physical education teacher, with a Diploma in Physical Education and Certificate in Education. He embarked on a teaching career at Sir Wilfrid Martineau School in Birmingham in 1963.

== Birmingham City Police and West Midlands Police ==
In 1967, Skitt changed careers and joined Birmingham City Police as a constable. On 7 October 1969, he was awarded the British Empire Medal (BEM) for Gallantry. The citation reads:

"At about midnight Constable Skitt, who was on duty in a police car, saw a grey van which had been involved in a non-stop accident and moved forward to intercept it. His approach was noticed and the vehicle drove off. Skitt followed the van which was driven at a fast speed with the lights switched off. After about a hundred yards Skitt saw a man lean out of the near-side door of the van and fire at him with a revolver. He saw the flash from the gun and heard the shot. After the cars had travelled another hundred yards the man again leaned out of the car and fired another shot at the Constable. The bullet hit the bonnet of the car causing a dent in the metal. Undeterred, Skitt continued the chase and a third shot was fired at him, but the bullet missed the car. Within the next five hundred yards two further shots were fired one of which hit the roof of the car above the Constable's head. At this stage Constable [David Frederick] Sadler, driving another car, joined the chase. The van travelled along the centre of the carriageway with Skitt close behind, followed by Sadler in his car. Another police car joined the chase, travelling in the opposite direction and the driver deliberately drove his vehicle into the van. There was a violent collision and both vehicles stopped. One of the occupants of the van jumped out with a revolver in his right hand and ran off. Sadler jumped out of his car, ran after the gunman flung himself at him and, with a rugby tackle, brought him to the ground, hitting the ground very heavily himself. The man then pointed the gun at Sadler but two other Constables were close at hand and one kicked the revolver out of the man's hand before he had time to fire. The three constables tried to pin the gunman on the ground but he was extremely violent and they had the greatest difficulty in holding him down. Constable Skitt joined them and the man was eventually handcuffed and arrested."

Sadler was also awarded the British Empire Medal and the three other constables involved received the Queen's Commendation for Brave Conduct. The three men in the van had been fleeing after committing an armed robbery at the Wednesfield Cash and Carry Company. On 22 May 1969, Peter John Hurley, 27, the gunman, and John Halls, 31, were convicted of attempted murder, armed robbery and conspiracy to rob and sentenced to eighteen years' and fifteen years' imprisonment respectively. The other man, John Richards-Jones, 27, was sentenced to twelve years for armed robbery and conspiracy. Mr Justice Talbot said to Skitt: "I do not think any words of mine can express the praise due to you for the way you performed your duty. May I respectfully add my congratulations on your bravery."

He remained with the force (which amalgamated to become West Midlands Police in 1974) until 1982, and had stints with the Criminal Investigation Department and Special Patrol Group. Having been selected for the accelerated promotion course at Bramshill Police College in 1971, he rose through the ranks to superintendent.

On 21 November 1974, Skitt was the duty inspector at Digbeth police station when a coded bomb threat was received from the Irish Republican Army. He arrived at the Tavern in the Town at 8.19pm, seconds after the bomb went off, and as the first senior officer on the scene of the Birmingham pub bombings took charge of the rescue operation.

== Metropolitan Police and chief officer ==
In 1982, having completed the senior command course at Bramshill, he transferred to the Metropolitan Police in London as chief superintendent in command of the Richmond division. He was promoted to commander in 1984 and appointed commandant of Hendon Police College. In 1986, he transferred to Northamptonshire Police as deputy chief constable, and in 1990 he was appointed chief constable of Hertfordshire Constabulary. He became well-known, along with his driver Phil, for dealing with incidents he encountered on the road and making arrests, leading to the force magazine starting a "Bill and Phil" feature.

On 18 July 1994, he transferred back to the Metropolitan Police as assistant commissioner and took command of Area No. 2 (North-West Area) following the reorganisation which saw expansion from four to six assistant commissioners, all but one placed in charge of one of the five operational areas. He remained in this post until he retired in 1997. He served as chairman of the personnel and training committee of the Association of Chief Police Officers from 1993 to 1996, and led the police response to the Sheehy Inquiry which recommended major restructuring of ranks and salaries, which was eventually largely rejected by the government, and also chaired the international affairs advisory committee from 1996 to 1997. He was also director of police extended interviews from 1995 to 1997 and a member of the Police Advisory Board and Police Training Council from 1993 to 1997. He was police adviser to the Police Negotiating Board from 1994 to 1996. He was also an advocate of equal opportunities in the police and was ACPO lead on the issue while he was deputy chief constable and chief constable.

== Post-retirement ==
Following his retirement, he was a member of the Criminal Cases Review Commission from 1997 to 2006, during which time he headed the James Hanratty review, and a lay member of the Office for Judicial Complaints Review Body from 2006 to 2012. He was also an adviser to the Council of Europe's committee for prevention of torture and inhuman and degrading treatment or punishment from 2001 until his death.

== Honours and awards ==

Ribbon	Description	Notes
	Order of the British Empire (CBE)	1997
	British Empire Medal (BEM)	
	Queen's Police Medal (QPM)	1990
	Police Long Service and Good Conduct Medal	

Skitt was awarded the Queen's Police Medal (QPM) in the 1990 Birthday Honours and appointed Commander of the Order of the British Empire (CBE) in the 1997 New Year Honours for services to the police.

== Private life ==
Skitt was married to Claire. They had four children.

== Footnotes ==
Police appointments
Preceded by Unknown	Commandant, Hendon Police College; 1984–1986	Succeeded by Unknown
Preceded by Unknown	Deputy Chief Constable of Northamptonshire; 1986–1990	Succeeded by Unknown
Preceded by Trefor Morris	Chief Constable of Hertfordshire; 1990–1994	Succeeded by Peter Sharpe
Preceded by First incumbent	Assistant Commissioner Area No. 2 (North-West Area), Metropolitan Police; 1994–1997	Succeeded by Anderson Dunn
