= Peter Brodie =

Peter Brodie may refer to:

- Peter Bellinger Brodie (conveyancer) (1778–1854), English conveyancer
- Peter Bellinger Brodie (1815–1897), English geologist
- Peter Brodie (police officer) (1914–1989), British police officer
- Peter Brodie (minister) (1916–1996), Church of Scotland minister and moderator of the General Assembly of the Church of Scotland
