= Matt Jukes =

British police officer

Matt Jukes QPM

Deputy Commissioner of Police of the Metropolis
- Incumbent
- Assumed office 26 May 2025
- Preceded by: Dame Lynne Owens

Assistant Commissioner for Specialist Operations
- In office July 2021 – May 2025

Assistant Commissioner for Transformation
- In office November 2018 – November 2020

Personal details
- Born: Matthew Jonathan Jukes
- Profession: Police officer

Matthew Jonathan Jukes QPM is a senior British police officer who is currently serving as the Deputy Commissioner of the Metropolitan Police Service. He previously served as Assistant Commissioner for Specialist Operations of the Metropolitan Police Service. Jukes has also previously held the rank of Chief Constable at South Wales Police.

== Career ==
Jukes graduated with a BA degree in Mathematics from St Peter's College, Oxford in 1995, and shortly afterwards joined South Yorkshire Police as a PC. He worked as a detective and in other roles from 1997 to 2006, including representing UK policing at G8 meetings and time with the precursor of the National Counter Terrorism Policing Network, and was also praised for his conduct during the Rotherham child sexual exploitation scandal.

=== South Wales Police (2010–2020) ===
He moved to South Wales Police in 2010 as an Assistant Chief Constable, rising to become its Chief Constable in January 2018, also being awarded a Queen's Police Medal in the New Year Honours that year. Jukes was awarded an honorary fellowship by Cardiff University for achieving international distinction.

=== Metropolitan Police Service (2020–present) ===
In November 2020, he moved to the Metropolitan Police Service (MPS) as an Assistant Commissioner, succeeding Mark Simmons and initially with a remit for the MPS's transformation programme. As of 7 October 2024, Jukes was Head of Counter Terrorism Policing at the Met. As of June 2025, he was also Head of the Counter Terrorism Coordination Committee.

In May 2025, it was announced he would take on the role of Acting Deputy Commissioner of the Metropolitan Police Service, after Dame Lynne Owens announced her retirement in February 2025; he was confirmed substantively in that rank in May of the same year.

== Honours ==
Jukes has been awarded the following honours:

Ribbon	Description	Year
	Queen's Police Medal (QPM)	2018
	Queen Elizabeth II Golden Jubilee Medal (Note: UK version of this medal)	2002
	Queen Elizabeth II Diamond Jubilee Medal	2012
	Queen Elizabeth II Platinum Jubilee Medal	2022
	King Charles III Coronation Medal	2023
	Police Long Service and Good Conduct Medal	2015

== Notes ==
Police appointments
Preceded by Neil Basu	Assistant Commissioner (Specialist Operations); Metropolitan Police Service; 2021–2025	Vacant
Preceded by Lynne Owens	Deputy Commissioner; Metropolitan Police Service; 2025–present	Incumbent
