= Paul Manning (police officer, born 1947) =

British police officer that received Queen's Police Medal

Paul Manning QPM

Assistant Commissioner Area No. 3 (North-East Area), Metropolitan Police
- In office 1997–2000

Assistant Commissioner Area No. 5 (South-West Area), Metropolitan Police
- In office 1994–1997

Deputy Chief Constable of Hertfordshire
- In office 1992–1994

Personal details
- Born: Paul Andrew Manning; 29 May 1947 (age 79)

Paul Andrew Manning QPM (born 29 May 1947) is a retired British police officer.

Manning was the son of Owen Manning and his wife Joyce Cynthia (née Murgatroyd). He was educated at Forest of Needwood High School in Rolleston on Dove, Staffordshire, and joined the Metropolitan Police in London as a cadet in 1964. He became a constable in 1966 and rose through the ranks before transferring to Staffordshire Police as a chief superintendent in 1985. He transferred to Avon and Somerset Constabulary as an assistant chief constable in 1988 and was appointed deputy chief constable of Hertfordshire Constabulary in 1992.

On 3 October 1994, he returned to the Metropolitan Police as assistant commissioner and took command of Area No. 5 (South-West Area) following the reorganisation which saw expansion from four to six assistant commissioners, all but one placed in charge of one of the five operational areas. He was also in charge of traffic policy. In 1997, he moved to Area No. 3 (North-East Area). He retired in 2000.

Manning chaired the traffic committee of the Association of Chief Police Officers from 1997 to 2000, have previously been secretary from 1996 to 1997. Following his retirement, he was an independent adviser to the Immigration and Nationality Directorate of the Home Office from 2001 to 2006.

Manning was awarded the Queen's Police Medal (QPM) in the 1996 Birthday Honours. He graduated with an MSc degree from Cranfield Institute of Technology. He married Margaret Anne Bucknall in 1967. They have two sons.

== Footnotes ==
Police appointments
Preceded by Unknown	Deputy Chief Constable of Hertfordshire; 1992–1994	Succeeded by Unknown
Preceded by First incumbent	Assistant Commissioner Area No. 5 (South-West Area), Metropolitan Police; 1994–1997	Succeeded by Denis O'Connor
Preceded by Anderson Dunn	Assistant Commissioner Area No. 3 (North-East Area), Metropolitan Police; 1997–2000	Succeeded by Last incumbent
