= Anderson Dunn =

Anderson Dunn QPM

Assistant Commissioner Strategic Development, Metropolitan Police
- In office 2000–2001

Assistant Commissioner Area No. 2 (North-West Area), Metropolitan Police
- In office 1997–2000

Assistant Commissioner Area No. 3 (North-East Area), Metropolitan Police
- In office 1994–1997

Deputy Chief Constable of Northamptonshire
- In office 1993–1994

Personal details
- Born: 6 May 1944 (age 81)

Anderson Dunn QPM (born 6 May 1944) is a retired British police officer.

Dunn was adopted by William Rennie and his wife Wilma (née Turner). He joined the Metropolitan Police in London as a constable in 1963 and rose through the ranks. In 1987, he transferred to Thames Valley Police as a chief superintendent, and the following year he was promoted to assistant chief constable (operations). In 1993, he transferred to Northamptonshire Police as deputy chief constable.

On 5 September 1994, he returned to the Metropolitan Police as assistant commissioner and took command of Area No. 3 (North-East Area) following the reorganisation which saw expansion from four to six assistant commissioners, all but one placed in charge of one of the five operational areas. In 1997, he moved to Area No. 2 (North-West Area). In 2000, when the force reverted to having four assistant commissioners each in charge of a portfolio instead of an operational area, he became Assistant Commissioner Strategic Development until he retired the following year.

Dunn was awarded the Queen's Police Medal (QPM) in the 1995 Birthday Honours. He graduated from Queen Mary College, London, with an LLB degree. He married Margaret Docherty in 1967. They have a son and a daughter.

== Footnotes ==
Police appointments
Preceded by Unknown	Assistant Chief Constable (Operations), Thames Valley Police; 1988–1993	Succeeded by Unknown
Preceded by Unknown	Deputy Chief Constable of Northamptonshire; 1993–1994	Succeeded by Unknown
Preceded by First incumbent	Assistant Commissioner Area No. 3 (North-East Area), Metropolitan Police; 1994–1997	Succeeded by Paul Manning
Preceded by Bill Skitt	Assistant Commissioner Area No. 2 (North-West Area), Metropolitan Police; 1997–2000	Succeeded by Last incumbent
Preceded by First incumbent	Assistant Commissioner Strategic Development, Metropolitan Police; 2000–2001	Succeeded by Last incumbent
