= Maurice Drummond =

Colonel The Honourable Sir Maurice Drummond KBE CMG DSO
- Born: 30 November 1877
- Died: 21 February 1957 (aged 79)
- Military career
- Allegiance: United Kingdom
- Branch: British Army
- Service years: 1897–1932
- Rank: Colonel
- Conflicts: First World War
- Awards: Companion of the Order of St Michael and St George; Distinguished Service Order
- Other work: Deputy Commissioner of Police of the Metropolis (1935–1946); Assistant Commissioner of Police of the Metropolis (1935); Deputy Assistant Commissioner of Police (1933–1935)

Colonel Sir Maurice Charles Andrew Drummond, KBE, CMG, DSO (30 November 1877 – 21 February 1957) was a British soldier, senior Metropolitan Police officer and, to date, the longest-serving Deputy Commissioner of Police of the Metropolis.

== Family ==
He was the second son of James Drummond, 8th Viscount Strathallan (1839–1893) by his second wife Margaret, daughter of William Smythe of Methven Castle. Eric Drummond, 7th Earl of Perth was his elder brother. On 4 May 1904 he married Ida Mary, daughter of George James Drummond of Swaylands House, Penshurst, by his wife Elizabeth Cecile Sophia (née Norman), a granddaughter of John Henry Manners, 5th Duke of Rutland; they had issue and she died on 11 December 1966. Their granddaughter Gilian Elfrida Astley Elfin Soames was the first wife of Francis Egerton Grosvenor, 6th Baron Ebury, now the 8th Earl of Wilton.

== Military service ==
Commissioned into the 3rd Battalion of the Black Watch (Royal Highlanders) as a second lieutenant on 6 January 1897, Drummond was subsequently appointed a second lieutenant in a line battalion on 20 May 1899, and went with the 2nd battalion to South Africa in October 1899 following the outbreak of the Second Boer War that month. He served throughout the war, took part in operations in Cape Colony, south of the Orange River, in 1899; and in the advance to relieve Kimberley, during which he was severely wounded in the Battle of Magersfontein (December 1899). After returning to active service he was promoted to lieutenant on 5 September 1900. Following the end of this war he left Point Natal for British India on the SS Ionian in October 1902 with other officers and men of his battalion, which after arrival in Bombay was stationed in Sialkot in Umballa in Punjab. Promoted to captain on 15 February 1906, he served as an aide-de-camp to Sir Bruce Hamilton, the General Officer Commanding-in-Chief Scottish Command, from 1912 to 1913. He rejoined his regiment in January 1914.

Drummond served during the First World War as a Deputy Assistant Adjutant General from 1915 to 1917. Promoted to major on 1 September 1915, he was awarded the Distinguished Service Order (DSO) in 1916. and appointed a Chevalier of the Legion of Honour in 1917) and Assistant Adjutant General from 1917 to 1918. He was mentioned in despatches by Field Marshal Haig on 9 November 1917, and received a brevet promotion to lieutenant-colonel on 1 January 1918. He was appointed a Companion of the Order of St. Michael and St. George (CMG) in the 1919 New Year Honours list. After the War he was again an AAG from 1920 to 1923. Promoted to colonel on 6 January 1923, he served as deputy director (staff duties) at the Air Ministry from 1923 to 1927. His final appointment was as the Assistant Quartermaster General, Eastern Command, from 1927 to 1931. He retired from the army on 5 October 1932.

== Police service ==
Drummond was a Deputy Assistant Commissioner in the Metropolitan Police from 1933 to 1935, Assistant Commissioner in 1935 and Deputy Commissioner from 1935 to 1946. He was made an Officer of the Venerable Order of St John in 1938 and a Knight Commander of the Order of the British Empire in the Birthday Honours of 1939.
