= Wyn Jones (police officer) =

Wyn Jones QPM

Assistant Commissioner Personnel and Training, Metropolitan Police
- In office 1989–1993

Personal details
- Born: Graham Wyn Jones c. 1943

Graham Wyn Jones QPM (born c. 1943) is a former British police officer.

== Gloucestershire and Thames Valley ==
Jones joined Gloucestershire Constabulary as a constable at the age of 19. He studied part-time for a law degree and rose rapidly through the ranks, becoming a chief inspector by the age of 32 and a chief superintendent by 36. In 1980, he was promoted to assistant chief constable with Thames Valley Police. In this role, he was in charge of the policing of the CND demonstrations at Greenham Common.

== Deputy assistant commissioner ==
In 1984, along with John Smith and David O'Dowd, he was one of a trio of young provincial rising stars who were appointed to the rank of deputy assistant commissioner in the Metropolitan Police as part of Commissioner Sir Kenneth Newman's drive for modernisation. At the age of 40 the youngest DAC in the force's history, he was put in charge of support services and policy for the Criminal Investigation Department (CID) and less than a year later was transferred to command the East London area. Here he was in charge of the controversial policing of the Wapping dispute which began in January 1986, which was accused of being heavy-handed. Jones was awarded the Queen's Police Medal (QPM) in the 1987 Birthday Honours.

== Assistant commissioner, investigation and dismissal ==
On 1 September 1989, Jones was promoted to assistant commissioner and was appointed Assistant Commissioner Personnel and Training (ACPT).

In December 1990, he was placed under investigation accused of "improper police work" for the businessman Asil Nadir. He was suspended on full pay and an investigation began headed by Chief Constable Peter Nobes of West Yorkshire Police, although given no assistant commissioner, who are appointed by royal warrant, had ever been so investigated before this posed problems as to legal precedent.

The investigation, which revolved around the provision of security guards for Nadir and began after one of Jones's chief superintendents who was himself under investigation for the same matter implicated his superior officer, was completed in April 1991 and the report submitted to the Director of Public Prosecutions, Sir Allan Green. Green decided that there was not enough evidence to charge Jones with a criminal offence.

He continued to face disciplinary action, however. The special tribunal convened to hear the case, which was chaired by the barrister Jeremy Gompertz advised by HM Inspector of Constabulary James Brownlow, cleared him of "conduct incompatible with his rank" in relation to Nadir, but did express concern over his use of a police staff car for trips to the West Country in connection with a police rugby club of which he was president, an overnight stay in Cambridge, a trip to a conference in France, and late accounting for expenses.

In March 1993, counsel for the Serious Fraud Office even suggested at the Old Bailey that Jones, Nadir, the latter's counsel Anthony Scrivener and Mr Justice Tucker had conspired to pervert the course of justice over Nadir's trial for fraud.

In June 1993, Home Secretary Michael Howard decided to ask the Queen to withdraw Jones's royal warrant, effectively dismissing him. Jones's supporters believed the decision was political, based on personality clashes with other senior officers and attempts by the conservative 'old guard' to remove a reformer who could have an abrasive manner. After being refused a judicial review, he was formally dismissed from the Metropolitan Police on 16 December 1993, the most senior Metropolitan Police officer ever to face disciplinary proceedings.

== Shoplifting trial ==
In March 1994, Jones was forcibly detained by a store detective and security guard who accused him of shoplifting chicken breasts, cheese and two bottles of wine worth £24 from a branch of Marks & Spencer on the King's Road near his home in Belgravia, despite having £1,700 in cash on him. He was convicted of theft by a jury on 11 April 1995 and fined £400.

== Footnotes ==
Police appointments
Preceded by Unknown	Assistant Chief Constable, Operations, Thames Valley Police; 1980–1984	Succeeded by Peter Winship
Preceded by Colin Sutton	Assistant Commissioner Personnel and Training, Metropolitan Police; 1989–1993	Succeeded by Last incumbent
