= Pippa Mills =

British police officer

Assistant Commissioner, Metropolitan Police
- Incumbent
- Assumed office 2023

Personal details
- Profession: Police officer

Phillippa Mills is a British senior police officer. From 2021 to 2023 she was Chief Constable of West Mercia Police. She is now an Assistant Commissioner in the Metropolitan Police, heading, since 2024, the Met Operations portfolio.

== Police career ==
Having studied at the University of Kent at Canterbury, Mills then served in the Metropolitan Police from 1996 to 2017, rising to Chief Superintendent (Temporary Commander), working in Westminster, Redbridge, Waltham Forest and Hackney BOCUs, leading on public order events such as the Queen's Diamond Jubilee and the wedding of Prince William and Catherine Middleton and overseeing major changes to the Met's Command and Control system.

She was heading Covert Policing and Intelligence by May 2017, when she transferred to Essex Police. There she was promoted to Assistant Chief Constable, then in March 2019 to Deputy Chief Constable, in which role she led the initial response to the Essex lorry deaths that October.

The West Mercia Police and Crime Commissioner announced on 30 June that she was his preferred candidate as the next Chief Constable of West Mercia Police. Mills' appointment was confirmed on 13 July, making her the first woman to lead West Mercia. On 8 August 2023 she announced she would be leaving West Mercia Police to return to the Metropolitan Police as an Assistant Commissioner.

== Honours ==

Ribbon	Description	Notes
	Queen Elizabeth II Golden Jubilee Medal	2002; UK Version of this Medal
	Queen Elizabeth II Diamond Jubilee Medal	2012; UK Version of this Medal
	Queen Elizabeth II Platinum Jubilee Medal	2022; UK Version of this Medal
	King Charles III Coronation Medal	2023; UK Version of this Medal
	Police Long Service and Good Conduct Medal	
