= Geoffrey Dear, Baron Dear =

British crossbench peer and police officer

The Right Honourable The Lord Dear QPM DL
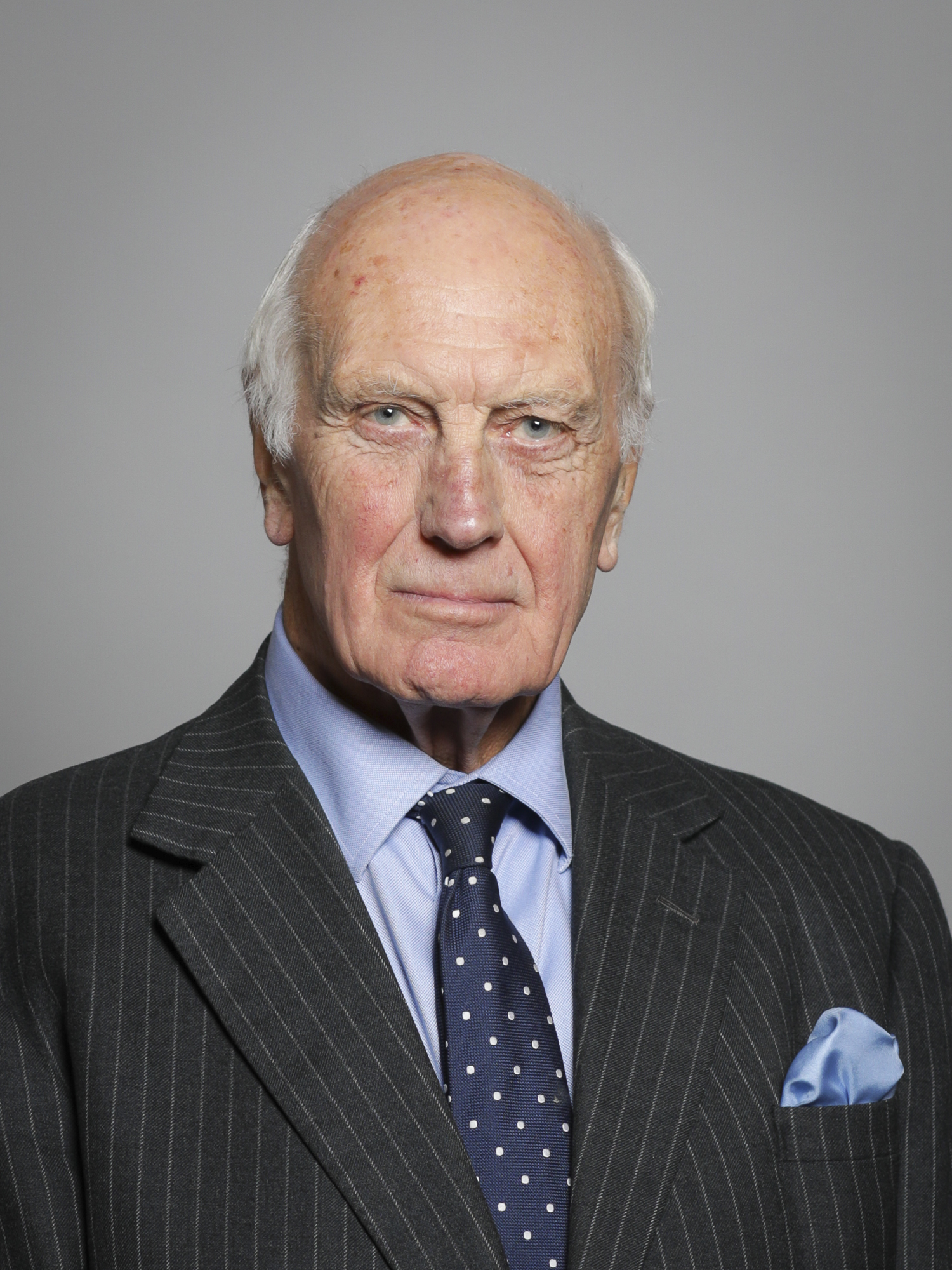

Member of the House of Lords
- Lord Temporal
- Life peerage 15 June 2006

Personal details
- Born: Geoffrey James Dear; 20 September 1937 (age 89)
- Education: Fletton Grammar School, Huntingdonshire; University College, London
- Occupation: Chief constable

Geoffrey James Dear, Baron Dear (born 20 September 1937) is a crossbench peer and retired British police officer who is a former Chief Constable of West Midlands Police. He was described by the broadcaster and writer Sir Robin Day as "the best known and most respected police officer of his generation".

== Police career ==
He was born to Cecil William Dear and Violet Mackney, and educated at Fletton Grammar School in Old Fletton, Huntingdonshire. He joined Peterborough Combined Police (which became part of Mid-Anglia Constabulary in 1965) as a Cadet and became a Constable in 1956. In 1965 he went to University College, London, on a Bramshill Scholarship to study law.

Graduating in 1968 and then serving as divisional commander in Cambridge, he was appointed Assistant Chief Constable (Operations) of Nottinghamshire Combined Constabulary (Nottinghamshire Police from 1974) in 1972. From 1975 to 1977, he was seconded to Bramshill Police College as Director of Command Training.

In September 1979, he was awarded the Queen's Commendation for Brave Conduct for his arrest of an armed and "mentally deranged" man who had barricaded himself in a house with his infant son after a multiple shooting incident.

In 1980 he transferred to the Metropolitan Police as Deputy Assistant Commissioner (Training). In this role he came to public attention as he instituted racial awareness training for police officers in the wake of the Brixton riots, into which he also conducted an internal investigation. On 1 December 1981 he was appointed Assistant Commissioner "D" (Personnel and Training).

He was awarded the Queen's Police Medal (QPM) in 1982 in recognition of his involvement post-riots in Brixton in 1981, in always difficult and sometimes dangerous circumstances, and headed the Met's investigation into the shooting of Steven Waldorf in 1983. In 1984, he moved to become Assistant Commissioner "A" (Operations and Administration). In 1985, he left the Metropolitan Police to become Chief Constable of West Midlands Police. He was the last officer to hold the post of Assistant Commissioner "A" before it was abolished in the reorganisation later that year.

In the West Midlands, he quickly came to the fore with his handling of the aftermath of the shooting by police of a young boy and, separately, the aftermath of the 1985 Handsworth riots. He instituted wide-ranging changes in that force, both administratively and operationally. In 1989, he headed the investigation into the Hillsborough Stadium Disaster. He was widely expected to be appointed Chief Constable of the Royal Ulster Constabulary in 1989, but the job went instead to Hugh Annesley.

Dear was Chief Constable during the last years of the West Midlands Serious Crime Squad, as its malpractices and unsafe convictions came to light. He disbanded it in 1989 and instituted an investigation by the West Yorkshire Police who found evidence of serious abuses but not enough to prosecute individual officers. A number of officers retired early or departed preventing internal disciplinary proceedings. Since the squad was shut down, over 60 convictions have been found to be unsafe and quashed.

During the late 1980s, Professor Robert Reiner conducted the only in-depth review of the rank of chief constable, interviewing all 43 post-holders. Reiner selected Dear as his prime example of the modern chief constable, describing him as "someone who combines the intellectual mastery of professional management skills with the operational experience and street credibility to command the confidence of the troops and Public".

He served as Chief Constable of the West Midlands until 1 April 1990, when he was appointed one of HM Inspectors of Constabulary. The decision was criticised by the MP Chris Mullin, given Dear's ultimate responsibility for the continuing failures of the West Midlands Serious Crime Squad.

He was knighted in the 1997 New Year Honours, shortly before his retirement.

He was a member of the Glidewell review into the Crown Prosecution Service from 1997 to 1998 and advised the Auld Review of the Criminal Courts process in 2002 and the Virdi Enquiry in 2003.

== Peerage ==
Dear was created a life peer as Baron Dear, of Willersey in the County of Gloucestershire, on 2 May 2006.

He has held a number of remunerated positions as non-executive director or chairman. He was a Deputy Speaker and a Deputy Chairman of Committees from 2015 to 2023, and was a member of the European Union Select Committee, 2011–2015, the Home Affairs Sub-Committee, 2008–2012, and the Economic and Financial Affairs Sub-Committee, 2011–2015, the Privileges and Conduct Committee and the Works of Art Committee, 2015–2020. In 2008, he successfully led opposition in the House of Lords to defeat the Government's intention to extend from 28 to 42 days the length of time that suspected terrorists could be held without charge. In 2012, he successfully amended the Public Order Act 1986 so as to protect freedom of speech in public, and similarly defeated Government attempts in 2014 to lower the threshold test for the creation of ASBOs from conduct likely to cause "harassment, alarm or distress" to "nuisance or annoyance".

Criticising the absence of prior governmental consultation concerning the bill, he was a prominent opponent in the Lords to the Government's legislation to introduce same-sex marriage, proposing a "wrecking amendment" to the bill, which was defeated. He spoke of fear of "such opposition to homosexuals in general that the climate of tolerance and acceptance in this country that we have all championed ... could well be set back by decades" in the event the bill passed. He asked for a commission to "call on the very best minds from the fields of theology, philosophy, sociology, jurisprudence and finance", despite the risk of taking up "valuable parliamentary time" ... "when so many other pressing matters demand our attention." Some of his points were addressed in summing-up. He later claimed that he had "no problem at all with homosexual marriage or partnerships", and that he tried to block the bill because, in his opinion, the Government had not gone "through the processes they should have done for something as sensitive and important as this".

It was his support for a lone West Indian builder that played a significant part in the exposure of the "Empire Windrush" scandal in 2018, that led to large scale reparations and compensation for many of those affected by flawed Home Office policies.

He is Deputy Lieutenant of Worcestershire, was Vice-Lord Lieutenant of that county from 1998 to 2001, and is an Honorary Bencher of Gray's Inn. He is a Fellow of University College, London and an Honorary Fellow of Birmingham City University

== Personal life ==
Dear married Judith Stocker in 1958. After the death of his first wife in 1996, he married Alison Jones two years later. He has two daughters and a son by his first marriage. Dear's son has played for England Rugby and Harlequins Rugby teams.

== Arms ==
Coat of arms of Geoffrey Dear, Baron Dear
Adopted 2008 Coronet Coronet of a Baron Crest A stag courant Or attired Azure resting the dexter hind roof upon a martlet wings elevated and addorsed Azure. Escutcheon Quarterly embattled Argent and Azure in the second and third quarters two keys in saltire wards upwards and outwards Or. Supporters On either side a labrador Sable gorged with a plain collar attached thereto a chain reflexed over the back Or holding in the mouth a snowdrop Argent slipped and leaved Or. Motto To Thine Own Self Be True Symbolism The crossed keys are taken from the Arms of Peterborough with which the grantee has a long connection. The embattling, andhence protection, reflects a career in the police force. The labradors and snowdrops are personal preferences. The stag was used as a device by a number of bodies associated with the County of Huntingdon and has been combined with a martlet as an allusion to the grantee's wife's maiden name of Martin. The design of this Crest was in some measure inspired by the flying horse and swallow which was the most celebrated exhibit at the 1973 exhibition at the Royal Academy on "The Genius of China".

Police appointments
Unknown	Assistant Chief Constable (Operations), Nottinghamshire Combined Constabulary/Nottinghamshire Police; 1972–1975	Unknown
Unknown	Director of Command Training, Bramshill Police College; 1975–1977	Unknown
Unknown	Assistant Chief Constable (Operations), Nottinghamshire Police; 1977–1980	Succeeded by Edward Griffith
Unknown	Deputy Assistant Commissioner (Training), Metropolitan Police; 1980–1981	Unknown
Preceded by John Gerrard	Assistant Commissioner "D", Metropolitan Police; 1981–1984	Succeeded by Geoffrey McLean
Preceded by Wilford Gibson	Assistant Commissioner "A", Metropolitan Police; 1984–1985	Office abolished
Preceded by Sir Philip Knights	Chief Constable of the West Midlands; 1985–1990	Succeeded by Ron Hadfield
Orders of precedence in the United Kingdom
Preceded by The Lord Boyd of Duncansby	Gentlemen; Baron Dear	Followed by The Lord Bilimoria
