= John McKay (police officer) =

British police inspector

Sir John Andrew McKay, CBE, OStJ, QPM (28 November 1912 – 24 October 2004) was Chief Inspector of Constabulary from 1970 until 1972.

McKay was educated at the University of Glasgow. He joined the Metropolitan Police in 1935. He was seconded to the Army between 1943 and 1947. After this he was appointed Assistant Chief Constable, then Deputy Chief Constable of the Birmingham City Police. He was Chief Constable of the Manchester City Police from 1959 to 1966 when he joined HM's Inspectorate of Constabulary.

Police appointments
Preceded by Eric St Johnston	HM Chief Inspector of Constabulary for England, Wales and Northern Ireland; 1970 –1972	Succeeded by John Hill
Preceded by ?	Chief Constable of Manchester City Police; 1959 –1966	Succeeded by ?
