= John Hill (police officer) =

British police officer (1914–2004)

Sir John Hill CBE DFC QPM

HM Chief Inspector of Constabulary
- In office 1972–1975
- Preceded by: Sir John McKay
- Succeeded by: Sir James Haughton

Deputy Commissioner of Police of the Metropolis
- In office 1 April 1972 – 3 December 1972
- Preceded by: Robert Mark
- Succeeded by: James Starritt

Personal details
- Born: 25 March 1914 Plymouth, Devon, England
- Died: 6 May 2004 (aged 90)
- Occupation: Police Officer
- Military career
- Allegiance: United Kingdom
- Branch: Royal Air Force
- Service years: 1942-1945
- Rank: Flying Officer
- Service number: 162372
- Awards: Distinguished Flying Cross

Sir John Maxwell Hill CBE DFC QPM (25 March 1914 – 6 May 2004) was a British police officer.

== Early life ==
Hill was born in Plymouth, the son of a civil servant. He was educated at Plymouth College and joined the Metropolitan Police as a constable in 1933. In 1938 he was selected for Hendon Police College and passed out the following year.

== War years ==
During the Second World War, Hill served in the Royal Air Force Volunteer Reserve. Enlisting in 1942, he was commissioned (from the rank of leading aircraftman) as a pilot officer in February 1944. In August 1944, he was promoted flying officer. In September 1945, while serving with 622 Squadron, he was awarded the Distinguished Flying Cross (DFC).

== Post-war career ==
Hill returned to the Metropolitan Police after the war at the rank of inspector. He was later promoted deputy commander at Scotland Yard in 1959. In 1963, he was promoted commander and appointed second-in-command of No.3 District (North-East London). In 1964, he transferred to No.1 District (North-West London) and in 1965 he was appointed one of HM Inspectors of Constabulary.

He returned to the Metropolitan Police as Assistant Commissioner "A" (Operations and Administration) in October 1966. In 1968 he became Assistant Commissioner "D" (Personnel and Training), and on 1 April 1972 he was appointed Deputy Commissioner of Police of the Metropolis. He was appointed Commander of the Order of the British Empire (CBE) in 1969.

On 3 December 1972, he became HM Chief Inspector of Constabulary. He was knighted in the 1974 New Year Honours and retired in 1975.

== Footnotes ==
Police appointments
Preceded by Unknown	Commander, No.3 District, Metropolitan Police; 1963–1964	Succeeded by Unknown
Preceded by Unknown	Commander, No.1 District, Metropolitan Police; 1964–1965	Succeeded by Unknown
Preceded by John Waldron	Assistant Commissioner "A", Metropolitan Police; 1966–1968	Succeeded by Andrew Way
Preceded by Robert Mark	Assistant Commissioner "D", Metropolitan Police; 1968–1972	Succeeded by John Mastel
Preceded by Robert Mark	Deputy Commissioner of Police of the Metropolis; 1972	Succeeded by James Starritt
Preceded by Sir John McKay	HM Chief Inspector of Constabulary for England and Wales; 1972–1975	Succeeded by Sir James Haughton
