= William C. Harris (police officer) =

Captain William C. Harris CB

Assistant Commissioner of Police of the Metropolis (Executive)
- In office 1856–1881

Personal details
- Born: William Charles Harris; 22 April 1809 Clapham, London, England
- Died: 8 March 1887 (aged 77)
- Occupation: British Army officer

Captain William Charles Harris (22 April 1809 – 8 March 1887) was the first Assistant Commissioner (Executive) of the London Metropolitan Police, holding the office from 1856 to 1881. In this office he was in charge of executive business, supplies and buildings.

Born in Clapham, Harris was commissioned into the 68th Foot. He purchased the ranks of Lieutenant on 8 November 1833 and Captain on 9 January 1838. He was appointed second Chief Constable of Hampshire County Constabulary in 1842 and held the post until his appointment as Assistant Commissioner in 1856.

He was appointed Companion of the Order of the Bath (CB) on 12 July 1881 and died in Starcross, Devon just under six years later.

== Footnotes ==
Police appointments
Preceded by First incumbent	Assistant Commissioner (Executive), Metropolitan Police; 1856–1881	Succeeded by Richard Pearson
