= John Dellow =

British police officer (1931–2022)

Sir John Albert Dellow CBE (5 June 1931 – 30 December 2022) was a British police officer.

Dellow was born in London and educated at William Ellis School, Highgate, and the Royal Grammar School, High Wycombe. After leaving school, he worked for Shell and did his national service in the Royal Army Ordnance Corps, working in personnel selection. In 1951, he joined the City of London Police as a Constable. Rising to Chief Inspector and attending Bramshill Police College, he transferred to Kent County Constabulary as a Superintendent in 1966. He was promoted to Chief Superintendent in 1968 and Assistant Chief Constable in 1969. In the same year, he became the first police officer to attend the Joint Services Staff College.

In 1973, he transferred to the Metropolitan Police as Deputy Assistant Commissioner (Traffic Planning). In 1975, he became DAC (Personnel), in 1978 he took over No.2 Area, and in 1979 he became DAC (Operations). In this post, Dellow commanded the police operation in the Iranian Embassy Siege in 1980. Later that year he was appointed DAC (Inspectorate). He was appointed Officer of the Order of the British Empire (OBE) in the 1979 New Year Honours.

On 10 May 1982, he was appointed Assistant Commissioner "B" (Traffic). In 1982, he headed the review of Buckingham Palace security after an intruder, Michael Fagan, managed to get into the Queen's bedroom. In March 1984 he was transferred as Assistant Commissioner "C" (Crime).

The reorganisation in 1985 meant he was the last officer to hold the post of Assistant Commissioner "C" and the first to hold the new post of Assistant Commissioner Specialist Operations (ACSO). He was appointed Commander of the Order of the British Empire (CBE) in 1985.

In 1987, he was promoted to Deputy Commissioner, holding the post until his retirement in 1991. He was vice-president of the Association of Chief Police Officers (ACPO) from 1988 to 1989 and president from 1989 to 1990. He was knighted in the 1990 Birthday Honours.

Dellow died on 30 December 2022, at the age of 91.

Dellow was portrayed by Martin Shaw in a 2017 film about the embassy siege, 6 Days.

== Footnotes ==
Police appointments
Preceded by Unknown	Deputy Assistant Commissioner (Traffic Planning), Metropolitan Police; 1973–1975	Succeeded by Unknown
Preceded by Unknown	Deputy Assistant Commissioner (Personnel), Metropolitan Police; 1975–1978	Succeeded by Unknown
Preceded by Unknown	Deputy Assistant Commissioner (No.2 Area), Metropolitan Police; 1978–1979	Succeeded by Unknown
Preceded by Unknown	Deputy Assistant Commissioner (Operations), Metropolitan Police; 1979–1980	Succeeded by Unknown
Preceded by Unknown	Deputy Assistant Commissioner (Inspectorate), Metropolitan Police; 1980–1982	Succeeded by Unknown
Preceded by Jock Wilson	Assistant Commissioner "B", Metropolitan Police; 1982–1984	Succeeded by Colin Sutton
Preceded by Gilbert Kelland	Assistant Commissioner "C", Metropolitan Police; 1984–1985	Succeeded by Last incumbent
Preceded by First incumbent	Assistant Commissioner (Specialist Operations), Metropolitan Police; 1985–1987	Succeeded by Hugh Annesley
Preceded by Peter Imbert	Deputy Commissioner of Police of the Metropolis; 1987–1991	Succeeded by John Smith
