= Ian Johnston (police officer) =

Sir Ian Johnston CBE QPM DL

Chief Constable, British Transport Police
- In office May 2001 – September 2009
- Preceded by: David Williams
- Succeeded by: Andrew Trotter

Personal details
- Born: 1945 (age 80–81)
- Education: London School of Economics
- Occupation: Director of security and resilience, LOCOG

Sir William Ian Ridley Johnston (born 1945) was the Chief Constable of British Transport Police. He became Chief Constable on 1 May 2001 when he succeeded David Williams, who had served as Chief Constable for three and a half years.

== Police career ==
Johnston joined the Metropolitan Police in 1965 and served as Staff Officer to former Metropolitan Police Commissioner Peter Imbert. In 1982, he graduated from London School of Economics with a first in Social Administration.

Having completed the Senior Command Course at Bramshill, Johnston moved to Kent Constabulary in 1989, where he served as Assistant Chief Constable in charge of first Administration and Supply, and then Operations, before moving back to the Metropolitan Police in 1992 as a Deputy Assistant Commissioner. In 1994, he was appointed Assistant Commissioner for the South East London area, but later became Assistant Commissioner with responsibility for Territorial Policing.

In September 2009, Johnston retired from the British Transport Police and was succeeded by Andrew Trotter.

Johnston came to media attention having given evidence before the enquiry and following the publication of the Macpherson Report into the murder of Stephen Lawrence. On behalf of the Metropolitan Police, Johnston apologised to the Lawrence family for institutionalised racism, but argued that race can legitimately be used by police as a basis for stop and search. Johnston reiterated this argument in the aftermath of the London Tube bombings in 2005.

Johnston had been mooted as the next Commissioner of the Metropolitan Police after the retirement of Sir John Stevens in 2005. Stevens had described Johnston as a "substantial figure" at the Met, and noted that following his departure for British Transport Police Johnston was missed. The role of Commissioner went to Sir Ian Blair.

== Later life ==
After retiring from British Transport Police, Johnston was appointed Director of Security and Resilience at LOCOG, for the London 2012 Olympics, responsible for signing the contract with G4S, which, in July 2012, led to the announcement that British troops would be deployed at the Olympics to cover shortfalls.

According to an insider from LOCOG talking to Newsnight, "there was inadequate scrutiny", "the management of security at Locog was 'thoroughly amateurish and incompetent'", and "It was the wrong strategy, to use only one company", compared with the approach of LOCOG's event services division.

Johnston held the chair of the Association of Chief Police Officers's Crime Business Area, and is chairman of Orpington Rovers Football Club, Bromley.

== Awards ==
In the 1995 New Year's Honours list, he was awarded the Queen's Police Medal. On 16 June 2001, as part of that year's Queen's Birthday Honours, he was appointed a Commander of the Order of the British Empire "for services to the Police". He was knighted in the 2009 Birthday Honours. He was appointed a Deputy Lieutenant for the Borough of Camden on 1 January 2008.

Ribbon	Description	Notes
	Knight Bachelor (Kt)	2009
	Order of the British Empire (CBE)	2001; Commander; Civil Division
	Queen's Police Medal (QPM)	1995
	Queen Elizabeth II Golden Jubilee Medal	2002; UK version of this medal
	Police Long Service and Good Conduct Medal	
