= Peter Winship =

British police officer (born 1943)

Sir Peter Winship CBE QPM

HM Inspector of Constabulary
- In office 1995–2005

Assistant Commissioner Inspection and Review, Metropolitan Police
- In office 1992–1995

Assistant Commissioner Management Support and Strategy, Metropolitan Police
- In office 1989–1992

Personal details
- Born: Peter James Joseph Winship; 21 July 1943 (age 82)

Sir Peter James Joseph Winship CBE QPM (born 21 July 1943) is a retired British police officer.

Winship is the son of Francis Edward Winship and his wife Iris May (née Adams). He was educated at Bicester Grammar School and joined Oxfordshire Constabulary as a constable in 1962. He was promoted sergeant in the new Thames Valley Constabulary in 1968 and rose through the ranks to superintendent in 1979. He read English language and literature at St John's College, Oxford, from where he graduated BA and MA. Attending the FBI Academy in 1980, he transferred to the Metropolitan Police in London in 1982 as a chief superintendent.

He returned to Thames Valley Police as Assistant Chief Constable Operations in 1984 and then went back to the Metropolitan Police as Deputy Assistant Commissioner of the Complaints Investigation Bureau in 1987. He served as DAC No. 1 Area from 1988 to 1 June 1989, when he was promoted to assistant commissioner. He was Assistant Commissioner Management Support and Strategy from 1989 to 1992 and then Assistant Commissioner Inspection and Review from 1992 to 1995, the only officer to hold this post. From 1993 to 1995, he was also director of police extended interviews and from 1992 to 1995 was chairman of the technical and research committee of the Association of Chief Police Officers. From 1995 to 2005, he served as an HM Inspector of Constabulary.

Winship was awarded the Queen's Police Medal (QPM) in the 1990 New Year Honours, appointed Commander of the Order of the British Empire (CBE) in the 1998 New Year Honours for services to the police, and knighted in the 2004 Birthday Honours, also for services to the police.

== Footnotes ==
Police appointments
Preceded by Wyn Jones	Assistant Chief Constable, Operations, Thames Valley Police; 1984–1987	Succeeded by Unknown
Preceded by Unknown	Deputy Assistant Commissioner (Complaints Investigation Bureau), Metropolitan Police; 1987–1988	Succeeded by Unknown
Preceded by Unknown	Deputy Assistant Commissioner No. 1 Area, Metropolitan Police; 1988–1989	Succeeded by Unknown
Preceded by John Smith	Assistant Commissioner Management Support and Strategy, Metropolitan Police; 1989–1992	Succeeded by Last incumbent
Preceded by First incumbent	Assistant Commissioner Inspection and Review, Metropolitan Police; 1992–1995	Succeeded by Last incumbent
Preceded by Unknown	HM Inspector of Constabulary; 1995–2005	Succeeded by Unknown
