= Frederick Wodehouse =

Senior British police officer

Major Sir Frederick Wodehouse KCB KCVO KPM

Assistant Commissioner of Police of the Metropolis "B"
- In office 1 October 1902 – 31 October 1918

Assistant Commissioner, City of London Police
- In office 1890 – 1 October 1902

Personal details
- Born: Edwin Frederick Wodehouse; 20 February 1851
- Died: 1 April 1934 (aged 83)
- Occupation: British Army officer

Major Sir Edwin Frederick Wodehouse, KCB, KCVO, KPM (20 February 1851 – 1 April 1934) was a senior British police officer, serving as Assistant Commissioner of both the City of London Police and the Metropolitan Police.

Wodehouse was the son of Colonel Edwin Wodehouse of the Royal Artillery. He also joined the Royal Artillery, passing out from the Royal Military Academy, Woolwich as a lieutenant on 8 January 1870. He served in the Second Anglo-Afghan War in 1878–1880, fighting at the Battle of Ali Masjid. He was promoted captain on 29 May 1880, and on 9 June 1881 he was appointed adjutant of the Suffolk Artillery Militia (later the 3rd Brigade, Eastern Division, Royal Artillery Militia), holding the position until he was promoted major on 24 November 1885.

In 1890 Wodehouse joined the City of London Police as Assistant Commissioner. In March 1902 he narrowly lost the election (by 95 votes to 100) of the Court of Common Council to replace Sir Henry Smith as Commissioner, although he had been Acting Commissioner since Smith's retirement at Christmas 1901. He initially agreed to stay as deputy to the new Commissioner, Captain William Nott-Bower, but on 1 October 1902 he transferred to the Metropolitan Police as Assistant Commissioner (Executive), responsible for executive business, supplies and buildings. This post became known as Assistant Commissioner "B" after a fourth Assistant Commissioner was appointed in 1909. Wodehouse retired on 31 October 1918.

Wodehouse was appointed Companion of the Order of the Bath (CB) in the 1909 Birthday Honours, Knight Commander of the Royal Victorian Order (KCVO) in the Coronation Honours of June 1911, and Knight Commander of the Order of the Bath (KCB) in the 1917 Birthday Honours. He was awarded the King's Police Medal (KPM) in the 1914 Birthday Honours.

Wodehouse married Margaret Repington in 1881. She died in 1927. They had two daughters.

== Footnotes ==
Police appointments
Preceded by Colonel Bowman	Assistant Commissioner, City of London Police; 1890–1902	Succeeded by David Bremner
Preceded by Sir Charles Howard	Assistant Commissioner "B", Metropolitan Police; 1902–1918	Succeeded by Frank Elliott
