= John Hermon =

Chief Constable of the Royal Ulster Constabulary (1980–1989)

Sir John Hermon OBE QPM

Chief Constable of the Royal Ulster Constabulary
- In office 1980–1989
- Preceded by: Sir Kenneth Newman
- Succeeded by: Sir Hugh Annesley

Personal details
- Born: 23 November 1928 Castletown, Northern Ireland
- Died: 6 November 2008 (aged 79) Bangor, Northern Ireland
- Spouse(s): Jean Webb (1954–1986); Sylvia Paisley (1988–2008)
- Children: 4

Sir John Charles Hermon OBE QPM (23 November 1928 – 6 November 2008) was the Chief Constable of the Royal Ulster Constabulary from 1980 to 1989.

== Early life ==
'Jack' Hermon was born in Castletown, Islandmagee, County Antrim, to William Rowan Hermon, a building contractor, and his wife, Agnes. He had a grammar school education and gave up an early career in accountancy to join the Royal Ulster Constabulary in 1950.

== Career ==
After joining the RUC, he was posted in various parts of western Northern Ireland, including Eglinton, Coalisland and Strabane, before sitting his sergeant's examinations. He was the first RUC officer to attend the advanced policing course at the British police training college in Bramshill in England in 1963.

He became Chief Constable in 1980, after an attachment to Scotland Yard. As Chief Constable, he changed the interview processes of terrorist suspects at the Castlereagh interrogation centre. An anonymous former interrogator has claimed that "The new chief constable was completely against any mistreatment of prisoners whatsoever...we started to detect a change .... straight away." Hermon is thought to have believed that the allegations of mistreatment were harming relations between the RUC and the wider communities. He retired in 1989, and became the longest-serving Chief Constable of the RUC.

One analysis has argued that Hermon's actions in charge of the RUC 'transformed it into a more independent force, shorn of its worst sectarian sympathies' and that these reforms also had the effect of allowing the RUC to be better able to support the peace process in the 1990s than it would have been otherwise. After retiring, he became, in June 1989, a consultant to a private security company.

== Marriages ==
He married Jean Webb in 1954,and had a son and a daughter. Following his knighthood in 1982 his wife of 32 years Lady Jean Hermon, died of cancer in 1986. Soon after, in 1987 he met Sylvia Paisley who had written an academic paper critical of Hermon's conduct in an employment case brought by female RUC officers. Although Sylvia Paisley was only a year older than his daughter, they married and had two sons. After his death, his widow, now known as Lady Sylvia Hermon Lady Hermon, was, from 2005 to 2010, the sole Ulster Unionist Party (UUP) Member of Parliament. From 2010 she was re-elected as an independent, with an increased majority. She held the North Down seat from 2001 to 2019.

== Politics ==
In 1998, Hermon campaigned for a yes vote during the Good Friday Agreement referendum.

== Death ==
Hermon suffered from Alzheimer's disease from at least 2004 until his death on 6 November 2008, at age 79. He died in a nursing home in Bangor.

== Honours ==
Hermon was appointed Officer of the Order of the British Empire (OBE) in the 1975 Birthday Honours. He was knighted in the 1982 New Year Honours and received the Queen's Police Medal in the 1988 Birthday Honours.

Ribbon	Description	Notes
	Order of the British Empire (OBE)	Officer; Civil Division
	Knight Bachelor (Kt)	
	Order of St John	
	Queen's Police Medal (QPM)	
	Queen Elizabeth II Silver Jubilee Medal	1977; UK Version of this Medal
	Police Long Service and Good Conduct Medal	
	Royal Ulster Constabulary Service Medal	

== Publications ==
- Holding the Line (1997 autobiography)

Police appointments
Preceded by Kenneth Leslie Newman	Chief Constable of the Royal Ulster Constabulary; 1980–1989	Succeeded by Hugh Annesley
