= William Horwood (police commissioner) =

British Army general

Brigadier-General Sir William Horwood GBE KCB DSO
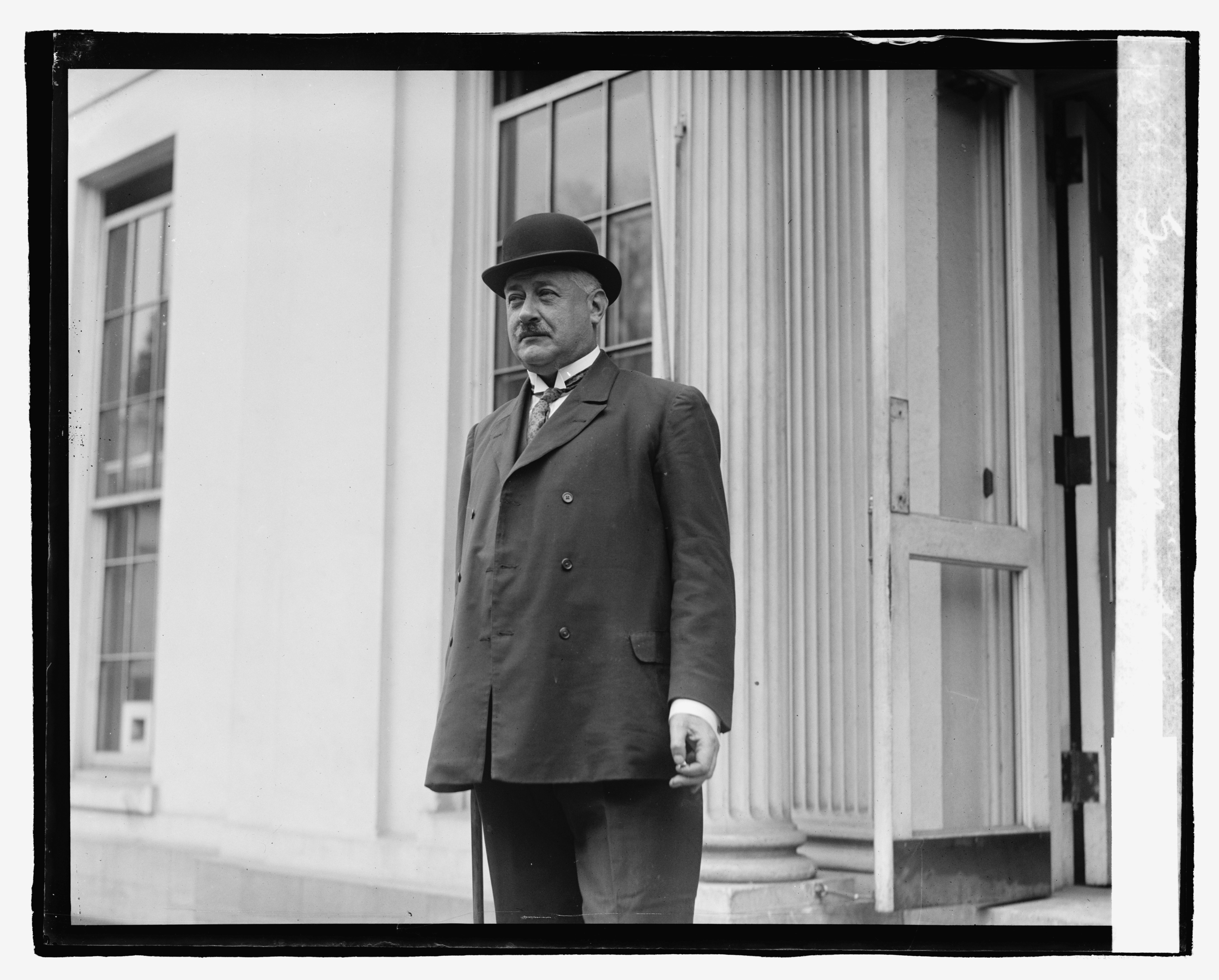
- Visiting the USA in 1923
- Born: William Thomas Francis Horwood; 9 November 1868; Broadwater, Sussex
- Died: 16 November 1943 (aged 75); West Mersea, Essex
- Military career
- Allegiance: United Kingdom
- Branch: British Army
- Service years: 1888–1918
- Rank: Brigadier-General
- Conflicts: First World War
- Awards: Knight Grand Cross of the Order of the British Empire; Knight Commander of the Order of the Bath; Distinguished Service Order; Mentioned in Despatches (7); Officer of the Legion of Honour (France); Officer of the Order of Leopold (Belgium); Croix de guerre (Belgium); Commander of the Order of the Dannebrog (Denmark); Order of the Rising Sun, Second Class (Japan); Order of St. Sava (Serbia); Knight Grand Officer of the Order of the Crown (Belgium); Order of the Crown (Italy); Order of the Star of Ethiopia (Ethiopia); Knight of the Order of the Nile

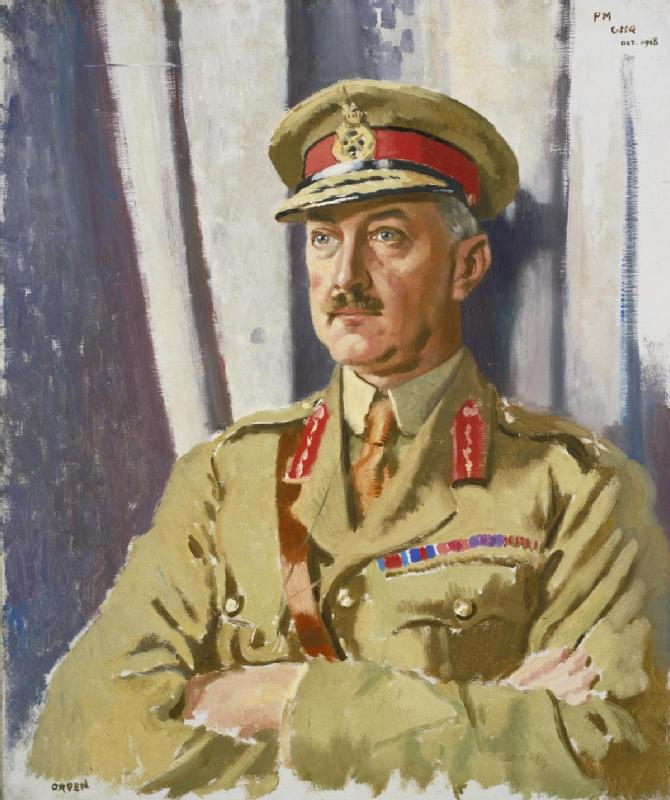
Portrait of Horwood as Provost-Marshal, by William Orpen

Sir William Thomas Francis Horwood (9 November 1868 – 16 November 1943) was a British Army officer who also served as Commissioner of Police of the Metropolis, head of London's Metropolitan Police, from 1920 to 1928.

== Military career ==
Horwood was born in Broadwater (now part of the town of Worthing) in Sussex and was educated at Highgate School. He was commissioned a second lieutenant in the East Kent Regiment on 26 February 1887. At the age of 20, he was commissioned into the 5th Lancers, and was promoted to lieutenant on 14 January 1891. He married Violet Fife (1864/65–1941) on 27 April 1897; they had one daughter. On 27 January 1900, as a lieutenant, he transferred to the Reserve of Officers, receiving a promotion to captain on 26 May. Later that year he was appointed adjutant and recruiting officer of the 49th Regimental District, and in 1902 became brigade major of the 24th Brigade, Royal Field Artillery. In 1904, he became an administrative officer at the War Office in London and stayed there until 1910. The following year, he became Chief of Police of the North Eastern Railway, where he brought in many improvements for the officers and modernisation including the introduction of new uniform such as the modern police helmet, sports clubs and libraries so that the officers might study for promotion. He also introduced a pension scheme for the railway police officers, the first there was.

On the outbreak of the First World War in 1914, Horwood was recalled to the Army on 5 August and appointed a Deputy Assistant Adjutant-General at the War Office, with the temporary rank of major. In 1915, he went to France as Provost Marshal of the General Headquarters of the British Expeditionary Force. He remained in this post until the end of the war, being awarded the Distinguished Service Order (DSO) on 4 June 1917 and being appointed Companion of the Order of the Bath (CB) on 1 January 1919. He was also mentioned in despatches seven times and was awarded the Croix de Guerre by both France and Belgium. He was also an Officer of the French Légion d'honneur, an Officer of the Order of Léopold and the Order of the Crown of Belgium, a Commander of the Order of the Dannebrog of Denmark, a 2nd Class Member of the Order of the Rising Sun of Japan, a Grand Cordon of the Order of the Crown of Romania, a member of the Order of the Crown of Italy and of the Order of the Star of Ethiopia and Order of the Nile. Horwood ended the war as a substantive captain, brevet lieutenant-colonel and temporary brigadier-general.

== Assistant Commissioner ==
In September 1918, General Sir Nevil Macready was appointed Commissioner of the Metropolitan Police. He knew Horwood from when had served as Adjutant-General of the BEF from 1914 to 1916 and appointed him Assistant Commissioner "A", in charge of administration and uniformed policing. He took up the post on 1 November 1918, having previously served as a Chief Constable for just three days.

During his time in this post, Horwood was responsible for the introduction of the first women police and set up the first mobile patrols, which later developed into the Flying Squad. In 1920, Macready was sent to command the troops in Ireland, and advised the Prime Minister, David Lloyd George, to appoint Horwood as his successor, which Lloyd George duly did. He took up the post on 20 April 1920.

== Commissioner ==
Horwood was a good administrator, but was regarded as somewhat distant, humourless, rude and arrogant by his men. As a soldier, he preferred the company of other military men to that of career policemen and appointed several to senior posts. In fact, he made no attempt to get to know his men and did not make regular visits to police stations as his predecessors had done. In return, he was contemptuously nicknamed "The Chocolate Soldier" after a mentally ill man named Walter Tatam attempted to assassinate him on 9 November 1922 by sending him a box of chocolates (Walnut Whips) poisoned with arsenic. Assuming they were a birthday present from his daughter, Horwood ate one and only survived because of the prompt attentions of nearby police surgeons. The nickname also summed up the fear at this time, particularly from those with left-wing sympathies, that there was an agenda to militarise the police, and Horwood's appointment of army officers to senior posts did nothing to alleviate this fear.

The rank and file were further upset in 1922, when Horwood apparently made no attempt to resist the demands of the Geddes Axe to reduce their pay, something which was eventually prevented by the efforts of the new Police Federation. Horwood also agreed to suspend recruiting, resulting in a 5% reduction in strength (about 1,000 men). This would have been disastrous during the 1926 General Strike had the Metropolitan Police not begun to be phased out of policing War Office and Admiralty property in favour of the War Office Constabulary and the Royal Marine Police in 1923 (a process which only ended in 1934), thus freeing up 1,300 officers for general duties back in London.

From 1923, many newspapers started to run increasing numbers of stories about police misconduct and corruption. Horwood failed to act, refusing to respond to allegations or investigate his force's activities, and dismissing the stories as gossip and scandal-mongering. This culminated in 1928, with the scandal involving Sir Leo Money and Irene Savidge, in which the police were accused of perjury and harassment. Horwood again failed to handle the case, which was saved by the efforts of Chief Constable Frederick Wensley of the Criminal Investigation Department. Horwood's reputation was further tarnished after Station Sergeant George Goddard of "C" Division was found guilty of taking bribes, confirming what many believed about the force's honesty and integrity.

Horwood was appointed Knight Commander of the Order of the Bath (KCB) in the 1921 New Year Honours, and Knight Grand Cross of the Order of the British Empire (GBE) on 2 November 1928, five days before his retirement. Although he had in fact been scheduled to retire at that time (two days before his sixtieth birthday), it appeared to the public that he was leaving in disgrace after that year's scandals and did him no favours. He died in 1943 at his home in West Mersea, Essex, after a short illness.

== Footnotes ==
Police appointments
Preceded by Unknown	Chief of Police, North Eastern Railway Police; 1911–1918	Succeeded by E. T. Barrell
Preceded by Frank Elliott	Assistant Commissioner "A", Metropolitan Police; 1918–1920	Succeeded by James Olive
Preceded by Sir Nevil Macready	Commissioner of Police of the Metropolis; 1920–1928	Succeeded by The Viscount Byng of Vimy
