= Andrew Way =

British police officer (1909–1974)

Andrew Greville Parry Way CMG (9 December 1909 – 8 September 1974) was a British police officer in the London Metropolitan Police.

Way was the son of a clergyman. He was educated at St Edward's School and Christ Church, Oxford and joined the Metropolitan Police as a Constable in 1934. He was almost immediately selected for Hendon Police College and passed out as a Junior Station Inspector in 1936. He was promoted Sub-Divisional Inspector in 1942. In September 1943, he was commissioned into the British Army on the General List as a Provost Marshal. He remained in the Army until June 1950, leaving with the rank of major and rejoining the Metropolitan Police. He served with the Special Police Corps of the Allied Military Government of Trieste from 1947 to 1952.

From January 1961 to May 1962, as a commander, he was seconded to the Montreal Police to assist in its reorganisation, for which he was appointed Companion of the Order of St Michael and St George (CMG) in the 1963 New Year Honours. Returning to London, he served as commander in the Traffic Department and in 1963 was appointed Assistant Commissioner "B" (Traffic). He was later moved to Assistant Commissioner "A" (Operations and Administration), probably in 1968. He commanded the British Anguilla Police Unit sent to deal with the unrest on the island in 1969 and retired later that year.

== Footnotes ==
Police appointments
Preceded by John Waldron	Assistant Commissioner "B", Metropolitan Police; 1963–1968	Succeeded by Robert Mark
Preceded by John Hill	Assistant Commissioner "A", Metropolitan Police; 1968–1969	Succeeded by James Starritt
