= Geoffrey McLean =

British police officer (1931-2008)

Geoffrey Daniel McLean CBE QPM (4 March 1931 – 24 October 2008) was a senior British police officer with the London Metropolitan Police.

McLean did his national service with the Royal Artillery and then joined the Metropolitan Police as a constable in 1951. He rose through the ranks to chief superintendent in 1969. From 1970 to 1972 he was seconded to the Home Office as staff officer to HM Chief Inspector of Constabulary. In 1975 he was promoted to commander. He attended the Royal College of Defence Studies in 1978 and the following year was promoted to deputy assistant commissioner. From 1981 to 1983 he was deputy commandant of the Police Staff College, Bramshill.

In 1984, McLean was appointed Assistant Commissioner "D" (Personnel and Training). He was the last officer to hold this post before the Metropolitan Police was reorganised in 1985, when he became Assistant Commissioner Territorial Operations (ACTO). He held this post until his retirement in 1990. He was awarded the Queen's Police Medal (QPM) in the 1981 Birthday Honours and appointed Commander of the Order of the British Empire (CBE) in the 1988 New Year Honours.

A keen sportsman, he was also chairman of both the Metropolitan Police Football Club and the Metropolitan Police Athletic Association,

== Footnotes ==
Police appointments
Preceded by Maurice Buck	Deputy Commandant, Bramshill Police College; 1981–1983	Succeeded by Unknown
Preceded by Geoffrey Dear	Assistant Commissioner "D", Metropolitan Police; 1984–1985	Succeeded by Last incumbent
Preceded by First incumbent	Assistant Commissioner Territorial Operations, Metropolitan Police; 1985–1990	Succeeded by Robert Hunt
