= John Waldron (police officer) =

English police officer (1909–1975)

Sir John Waldron KCVO

Commissioner of Police of the Metropolis
- In office 1968 – 31 March 1972
- Monarch: Elizabeth II
- Prime Minister: Harold Wilson; Edward Heath
- Preceded by: Sir Joseph Simpson
- Succeeded by: Sir Robert Mark

Deputy Commissioner of Police of the Metropolis
- In office 1966–1968

Assistant Commissioner of Police of the Metropolis "A"
- In office 1963–1966

Assistant Commissioner of Police of the Metropolis "B"
- In office 1958–1963

Chief Constable of Berkshire Constabulary
- In office 1954–1958

Personal details
- Born: John Lovegrove Waldron; 5 November 1909 Wargrave, Berkshire, England
- Died: 24 August 1975 (aged 65)
- Profession: Police officer

Sir John Lovegrove Waldron KCVO (5 November 1909 – 24 August 1975) was a British police officer who served as Chief Constable of Berkshire Constabulary from 1954 to 1958 and Commissioner of the London Metropolitan Police from 1968 to 1972.

== Early career ==
Born in Wargrave, Berkshire, Waldron was educated at Charterhouse School, and Clare College, Cambridge. He joined the Metropolitan Police in 1934 and passed out from Hendon Police College. In 1943 he was seconded to the Ceylon Police, serving as Deputy Inspector-General (CID) from 1944 to 1947. The Inspector-General was Ranulph Bacon, whom Waldron would later succeed as both Assistant Commissioner and Deputy Commissioner of the Metropolitan Police.

Waldron then returned to the Metropolitan Police, but was appointed an Assistant Chief Constable of Lancashire Constabulary in 1951. In 1954 he became Chief Constable of Berkshire Constabulary.

== Return to the Metropolitan Police ==
In 1958, Waldron returned to London as Assistant Commissioner "B" (Traffic). He was appointed Commander of the Royal Victorian Order (CVO) in the 1959 New Year Honours. After five years in charge of Traffic, he transferred to become Assistant Commissioner "A" (Operations and Administration) in 1963. In 1965, Waldron was responsible for organising the policing of the funeral of Sir Winston Churchill, a duty for which he was appointed Knight Commander of the Royal Victorian Order (KCVO) in the 1966 Birthday Honours.

In 1966, Waldron was promoted to Deputy Commissioner, the second highest rank in the Met. When the Commissioner, Sir Joseph Simpson, died suddenly in 1968, Waldron was appointed his successor. The appointment was assumed by many to be a temporary fill-in role, but circumstances such as a rise in police salaries and pensions, and the fall of the Labour government in 1970 saw Waldron stay on for several years longer than expected.

== Waldron reforms ==
A management consultancy firm had been engaged to assess the structure and operations of the Metropolitan Police during Simpson's tenure as Commissioner, and their report was released shortly after Simpson's death and Waldron's appointment. Waldron and his deputies decided not to proceed with many of the report's more drastic recommendations, and the creation of the Greater London Council and the new London boroughs were causing significant strain on territorial policing of London.

Waldron did, however, set in motion the move to area-based policing and renamed the former Police Districts to Areas.

== Retirement ==
Waldron retired on 31 March 1972, although several allegations of corruption within the police force during the last days and after his tenure tainted his reputation somewhat.

== Honours ==

Ribbon	Description	Notes
	Royal Victorian Order (KCVO)	Knight Commander 1966 Birthday Honours List; Commander (CVO) 1959 New Year Honours List
	Defence Medal	
	Queen Elizabeth II Coronation Medal	1953
	Police Long Service and Good Conduct Medal	

== Footnotes ==
Police appointments
Preceded by Ranulph Bacon	Deputy Inspector-General of Police of Ceylon; 1944–1947	Succeeded by Unknown
Preceded by Humphrey Lege	Chief Constable of Berkshire; 1954–1958	Succeeded by Thomas Hodgson
Preceded by Douglas Webb	Assistant Commissioner "B", Metropolitan Police; 1958–1963	Succeeded by Andrew Way
Preceded by Ranulph Bacon	Assistant Commissioner "A", Metropolitan Police; 1963–1966	Succeeded by John Hill
Preceded by Sir Ranulph Bacon	Deputy Commissioner of Police of the Metropolis; 1966–1968	Succeeded by Robert Mark
Preceded by Sir Joseph Simpson	Commissioner of Police of the Metropolis; 1968–1972	Succeeded by Sir Robert Mark
