= Peter Brodie (police officer) =

British and Sri Lankan police officer (1914–1989)

Peter Ewen Brodie OBE QPM (6 May 1914 – 7 September 1989) was a British police officer.

Brodie was born at Lethen, Nairnshire and educated at Harrow School. He joined the Metropolitan Police in London in 1934, serving as a uniformed officer and later in the Criminal Investigation Department (CID). Between 1943 and 1947 he was seconded to the Ceylon Police. In 1949 he was appointed Chief Constable of Stirling and Clackmannan Police in his native Scotland. He was appointed Officer of the Order of the British Empire (OBE) in the 1954 Birthday Honours.

In 1958 he returned to England as Chief Constable of Warwickshire Constabulary. He was awarded the Queen's Police Medal (QPM) in the 1963 Birthday Honours. In February 1964 he was appointed one of HM Inspectors of Constabulary for England and Wales.

Brodie returned to the Metropolitan Police in April 1966 as Assistant Commissioner "C", in charge of the Criminal Investigation Department. He was a member of the Advisory Committee on Drug Dependence and the Executive Committee of Interpol from 1967 to 1970. Regarded as a tough "hard-liner", he took early retirement in 1972 two years before reaching his sixtieth birthday and the day before the more liberal Robert Mark took over as Commissioner. He had been Mark's chief rival for the top job and opposed Mark's plans for greater integration and interchange between CID and uniformed branches, preferring the old system of CID being almost completely self-contained. During his time in the job, CID detection rates had risen from just over 20 per cent to nearly 30 per cent and the powerful Kray and Richardson gangs had been smashed. He was very popular with his men, most of whom wanted to see him appointed Commissioner. He retired to Warwickshire.

== Footnotes ==
Police appointments
| Preceded by First incumbent | Chief Constable of Stirling and Clackmannan; 1949–1958 | Succeeded by David Gray |
| Preceded by Geoffrey White | Chief Constable of Warwickshire; 1958–1964 | Succeeded by Richard Matthews |
| Preceded by William Willis | HM Inspector of Constabulary for England and Wales; 1964–1966 | Succeeded by John McKay |
| Preceded by Sir Ranulph Bacon | Assistant Commissioner "C", Metropolitan Police; 1966–1972 | Succeeded by Colin Woods |
