= Robert Hunt (police officer) =

Robert Hunt OBE QPM
- Born: 6 July 1935; Camberwell, London
- Died: 15 May 2013 (aged 77)
- Other name: Bob
- Education: University of London
- Police career
- Country: 1955–1995
- Department: Metropolitan Police Service
- Service years: 40
- Rank: Assistant Commissioner
- Awards: Officer of the Order of the British Empire (1985); Queen's Police Medal (1992)

Robert Alan Hunt OBE QPM (6 July 1935 – 15 May 2013) was a senior British police officer. He served as Assistant Commissioner from 1990 to 1995 with responsibility for operations at all police stations throughout the Metropolitan Police Service.

== Early life ==
Hunt was born on 6 July 1935, in Camberwell, London. He was the youngest of five children. His mother was Minnie Hunt, who had been a servant at Clandon Park, Surrey. His father, Peter Hunt, was a Scottish miner who had been awarded the Military Medal during World War I. He spent his childhood living in Herne Hill. He was educated at Effra Parade Primary School and Dulwich College. In 1946, having done well in his Eleven-Plus exam, he was offered a full scholarship to attend Dulwich College, a public school in southeast London.

Following school, he undertook his National Service in the Royal Artillery between 1953 and 1955. He joined the other ranks on the advice of his father, even though he had the option to take a commission and serve as an officer.

== Career ==
Hunt joined the Metropolitan Police Service in 1955, partly because it offered married quarters. During his first briefing at his local Brixton station, he learnt that he had lived alongside many known criminals in the Herne Hill council flats of his youth. He spent his early years in the force policing multicultural inner city areas in South London.

He joined New Scotland Yard's Community Relations branch. During his time there he devised a new model for police visits to schools which was later adopted nationwide. He also worked on the increasingly urgent issue of relations between the police and London's black communities. He garnered a reputation for establishing public order during the 1968 anti-war demonstration in Grosvenor Square. He became a Chief Superintendent in the 1973, at the height of the IRA bombing campaign. He was involved in the successful ending of the 1975 Balcombe Street Siege and escaped being blown up during a bombing of Madame Tussauds. He was promoted to Commander in 1976. He was appointed head of the public order branch at New Scotland Yard in 1977, serving in that position for two years. He created the Gold (strategic), Silver (tactical) and Bronze (implementation) command structure for policing disorder, which is still in use.

He was appointed Deputy Assistant Commissioner in 1982, becoming responsible for operational policing in a quarter of London. During that posting, he was closely involved in far-reaching organisational reforms of the Metropolitan Police Service. From 1987 to 1990, he headed the Force Inspectorate. On 1 September 1990, he was promoted to Assistant Commissioner of Police of the Metropolis. He served as Assistant Commissioner Territorial Operations, with responsibility for operations at all police stations throughout London. In 1993, he was asked by the commissioner, Sir Paul Condon, to head a radical reorganisation of the Metropolitan Police to create a modern managerial structure and philosophy.

He retired from the police in April 1995 as the longest serving Metropolitan Police Officer. In his retirement message, he summed up his policing philosophy:

"There has to be partnership – working with the public not against them."

== Later life ==
Following his retirement, he went on to act as an adviser to police forces in Jamaica, Uganda and the British Virgin Islands. He lived in Banstead, Surrey, England.

He died on 15 May 2013, aged 77.

== Personal life ==
Hunt met a nursery school teacher, Jean, during his national service. In 1956, he and Jean White married. Together they had three daughters and a son; Gay, Sharon, Tracey, and Murray.

He underwent a triple heart bypass operation in 1986.

== Honours ==
In the 1985 New Year Honours, Hunt was appointed Officer of the Order of the British Empire (OBE). In June 1986, he was appointed Member of the Venerable Order of Saint John (MStJ). He was awarded the Queen's Police Medal for Distinguished Service in the 1992 New Year Honours.

Police appointments
Preceded by Geoffrey McLean	Assistant Commissioner Territorial Operations, Metropolitan Police; 1991–1995	Succeeded by Last incumbent
