= James Starritt =

British police officer (1914–2000)

Sir James Starritt KCVO (15 May 1914 – 19 September 2000), often known as Jim Starritt, was a British police officer in the London Metropolitan Police.

Starritt was born in Carrigans, a tiny village in the Laggan district of eastern County Donegal, Ireland, the son of a land auctioneer. His family – staunch Ulster Presbyterians – later moved east to the small town of Magherafelt in County Londonderry following the Partition of Ireland. He was educated at the local Rainey School.

He joined the Metropolitan Police as a Constable in 1935 and was first posted to Paddington. In the Second World War he joined the Royal Marines and was later commissioned and served in the Far East, being promoted to Temporary Lieutenant in April 1945 and Acting Temporary Captain in November 1945. After the war he returned to the Metropolitan Police, and was promoted Sergeant in 1947, Inspector in 1952, and Chief Inspector in 1955. He spent almost all of his career in Central London and was a particular expert on the criminal gangs of Soho.

He was Chief Superintendent commanding "C" Division at West End Central in the early 1960s and featured prominently in the 1964 public inquiry into one of his men, Detective Sergeant Harold Challenor, who continued to work despite having paranoid schizophrenia. Starritt was exonerated of all blame in the case, as Challenor had never been certified as medically unfit for duty. He was promoted Deputy Commander in 1965 and Commander in 1967, working in the Force Inspectorate.

In 1968, Starritt was appointed Assistant Commissioner "B" (Traffic) and later (probably in early 1970) moved to become Assistant Commissioner "A" (Operations and Administration). In 1972, he was appointed Deputy Commissioner. In this post, he oversaw the internal inquiry into the operations of Special Branch in connection with Kenneth Lennon, an Irish police informant found shot dead in a ditch in Surrey in 1974, which was generally accepted as vindicating the Metropolitan Police. In 1975, he headed the inquiry into police corruption in Soho which led to the arrests of twelve officers, including two commanders and a chief superintendent. In his autobiography, In the Office of Constable, Commissioner Sir Robert Mark wrote that Starritt deserved an "honoured place in Metropolitan Police history for putting an end to malpractice that had caused the force incalculable harm for many years".

He was appointed Commander of the Royal Victorian Order (CVO) in the 1973 New Year Honours and Knight Commander of the Royal Victorian Order (KCVO) in the 1975 Birthday Honours, shortly before his retirement.

== Footnotes ==
Police appointments
Preceded by Robert Mark	Assistant Commissioner "B", Metropolitan Police; 1968–1970	Succeeded by Colin Woods
Preceded by Andrew Way	Assistant Commissioner "A", Metropolitan Police; 1970–1972	Succeeded by John Mastel
Preceded by John Hill	Deputy Commissioner of Police of the Metropolis; 1972–1975	Succeeded by Colin Woods
