= Frank Elliott (police officer) =

Frank Elliott CB

Assistant Commissioner of Police of the Metropolis "B"
- In office 1918–1931

Assistant Commissioner of Police of the Metropolis "A"
- In office 11 March 1914 – 1918

Personal details
- Born: Frank Louis Dumbell Elliott; 11 September 1874 Nynee Tal, British India
- Died: 26 March 1939 (aged 64)
- Occupation: Civil servant

Frank Louis Dumbell Elliott CB (11 September 1874 – 26 March 1939) was an Assistant Commissioner of the London Metropolitan Police from 1914 to 1931.

Elliott was born in Nynee Tal, British India, the son of Sir Charles Elliott, former Lieutenant-Governor of Bengal, and Louisa Jane Dumbell of Onchan, Isle of Man, daughter of George Dumbell. He was educated at Harrow School from 1888 and won a scholarship to Trinity College, Cambridge in 1892, obtaining a first class degree in Classics in 1896. In 1898, he joined the Home Office. In 1899, he married Mabel Murray; they had a daughter and a son (who became a solicitor).

He rose through the ranks of the Home Office and was appointed an Assistant Secretary in 1913. During this time, he served as private secretary to both Thomas Cochrane (1903–1905) and Herbert Samuel (1905–1908) when they were Parliamentary Under-Secretaries of State at the Home Office. In 1911, he was appointed secretary of the Isle of Man Constitution Committee. An early motorist, from 1908 to 1913 he served as a Lieutenant in the Army Motor Reserve of Officers. He was also an enthusiastic mountaineer and member of the Alpine Club.

On 11 March 1914, Elliott was appointed Assistant Commissioner "A" of the Metropolitan Police, in charge of administration and uniformed policing. In 1918, he was appointed Assistant Commissioner "B" and became solely responsible for traffic, which was becoming an increasing problem in London. Elliott introduced one-way streets and traffic lights. He was appointed Companion of the Order of the Bath (CB) in the 1920 New Year Honours.

On 6 November 1922, Elliott and his colleague, Assistant Commissioner Trevor Bigham, were sent a box of chocolate éclairs poisoned with arsenic. They were suspicious and did not eat them, and Walter Tatam, who had a history of mental problems, was later found guilty of attempted murder.

By 1931, Elliott's health had begun to fail (he was especially experiencing heart problems) and he retired early.

On 19 July 1932, Elliott, by then living at Camp View, near Wimbledon Common, was appointed a Justice of the Peace for Surrey.

== Footnotes ==
Police appointments
Preceded by Sir Alexander Carmichael Bruce	Assistant Commissioner "A", Metropolitan Police; 1914–1918	Succeeded by William Horwood
Preceded by Sir Frederick Wodehouse	Assistant Commissioner "B", Metropolitan Police; 1918–1931	Succeeded by Alker Tripp
