= Robert Mark =

British police commissioner (1917–2010)

Sir Robert Mark GBE KStJ QPM
- Mark in March 1977

Commissioner of Police of the Metropolis
- In office 17 April 1972 – 13 March 1977
- Monarch: Elizabeth II
- Prime Minister: Edward Heath; Harold Wilson; James Callaghan
- Preceded by: Sir John Waldron
- Succeeded by: Sir David McNee

Personal details
- Born: 13 March 1917 Chorlton-cum-Hardy, Manchester, England
- Died: 30 September 2010 (aged 93)
- Profession: Police officer
- Military career
- Allegiance: United Kingdom
- Branch: British Army
- Service years: 1942–1947
- Rank: Major
- Units: 108th Regiment (Lancashire Fusiliers), GHQ Liaison Regiment of the Manchester Regiment
- Awards: see: Honours section

Sir Robert Mark GBE KStJ QPM (13 March 1917 – 30 September 2010) was a senior British police officer who served as Chief Constable of Leicester City Police, and later as Commissioner of the Metropolitan Police from 1972 to 1977.

Mark was the first Metropolitan Commissioner to have risen through all the ranks from the lowest to the highest (a route followed by all subsequent Commissioners), although a few predecessors had served as Constables prior to fast-track promotion.

== Early life ==
Mark was born in Chorlton-cum-Hardy, a suburb of Manchester, the youngest of five children of a prosperous mantle manufacturer originally from Yorkshire. He was educated at William Hulme's Grammar School, where he was undistinguished academically, but became captain of rugby and head prefect.

== Police career begins ==
When he left school in 1935 he got a job as a carpet salesman, but finding this boring, in 1937 he joined Manchester City Police as a constable, much to the dismay of his father, who considered it beneath him and said becoming a policeman was only one step above going to prison. While still a probationer he joined the plain clothes branch, mainly dealing with vice, and in 1938 he joined Special Branch.

== Army service ==
In 1942, he joined the British Army, trained at Sandhurst. Mark recalled a test for claustrophobia which involved being tipped down a 45-degree drainpipe into a pitch black chamber with two false and one actual exit.

He was commissioned into the Royal Armoured Corps in October 1943. He initially served with the 108th Regiment (Lancashire Fusiliers), but through the influence of his elder brother James, who worked at the War Office, he then transferred to the Manchester Regiment in December 1943, attached to the GHQ Liaison Regiment, known as Phantom, which provided liaison with special forces units. With them, he took part in the Normandy landings. In 1945 he was promoted captain and posted to the military government at Bad Oeynhausen in Germany, where he remained until his demobilisation as a major in 1947.

== Return to Manchester ==
Returning to Manchester and Special Branch, he was soon promoted Detective Sergeant, but considered leaving the police until he received a series of rapid promotions, to Detective Inspector in 1950, uniformed Chief Inspector in 1952, Superintendent, and finally Chief Superintendent in charge of the force's administration, still younger than any inspector in the force. He applied for the post of Assistant Chief Constable of Newcastle upon Tyne, but was unsuccessful and instead enrolled on the senior command course at the National Police College.

== Appointed Chief Constable ==
On 1 January 1957 he was appointed Chief Constable of Leicester. There he instituted many reforms, especially regarding Leicester's traffic problems, including appointing the city's first traffic wardens. He acquired the nickname "Lone Ranger of Leicester".

Following the 1966 escape of the spy George Blake from Wormwood Scrubs, Mark was appointed to the Mountbatten inquiry into prison security. Here he attracted the attention of Home Secretary Roy Jenkins, and in February 1967 was appointed Assistant Commissioner "D" (Personnel and Training) of the Metropolitan Police, where his welcome was less than ecstatic from a force that did not like outsiders; at the end of his first week, he was encouraged by Commissioner Sir Joseph Simpson to apply for the post of Chief Constable of Lancashire.

The following year he was briefly appointed Assistant Commissioner "B" (Traffic). However, in March 1968, Simpson died in office. Peter Brodie, Assistant Commissioner "C" (Crime), was widely tipped to succeed him, but Home Secretary James Callaghan saw the opportunity to impose government will on the force and offered the job to Mark. Mark, realising that an outsider would not be accepted at this time, suggested the appointment of Deputy Commissioner Sir John Waldron, with himself succeeding Waldron as Deputy Commissioner.

== CID reform ==
The Metropolitan Police had recently been rocked by exposure of massive corruption in the Criminal Investigation Department, and Mark, with the famous pronouncement, that "a good police force is one that catches more crooks than it employs", set about attempting to reform it. He changed disciplinary procedures, returned many detectives to uniform, made a number of television appearances praising the uniformed branch following student unrest and protests against the Vietnam War, and began to gather around him a group of loyal, ambitious uniformed officers who had not graduated from the old Hendon Police College.

The uniformed branch began to gain precedence and CID was increasingly put under uniformed command. In 1971, with Brodie, an old-school officer who commanded CID, out of the country, Mark formed A10, a special unit established to investigate corruption. Among those rooted out were Commander Kenneth Drury, head of the Flying Squad, and Detective Chief Superintendent Bill Moody, head of the Obscene Publications Squad and ironically also of the Anti-Corruption Squad. Both were jailed, along with several other officers, and nearly 500 more were dismissed or forced to resign.

In general, he was supported by the uniformed branch, who were themselves exasperated with CID corruption.

== Appointed Commissioner ==
Following Waldron's retirement, he was appointed Commissioner on 17 April 1972. Brodie took early retirement the day before and was replaced by Assistant Commissioner "B" Colin Woods, who had never previously served in CID. Mark continued to root out corruption, ably assisted by his Deputy Commissioner, Sir James Starritt. He also had to deal with the increase in IRA terrorism, including the Balcombe Street Siege, and also the Knightsbridge Spaghetti House Siege, taking personal command of both.

Although popular with liberals for his stamping out of police corruption, Mark was himself far from a liberal, had no time for anti-establishment demonstrators and such groups as the National Council for Civil Liberties, and was responsible for the expansion of the Special Patrol Group, whose paramilitary methods provoked considerable criticism. Mark resigned in 1977 following a public disagreement with Jenkins, then Home Secretary, over the Police Act 1976 and the introduction of an independent police complaints body, which Mark considered would undermine police discipline and effective investigation.

== Honours ==
He was awarded the Queen's Police Medal in the 1965 Birthday Honours, knighted in the 1973 New Year Honours, and appointed Knight Grand Cross of the Order of the British Empire (GBE) in the 1977 New Year Honours. He was appointed Knight of the Order of Saint John in 1978.

Ribbon	Description	Notes
	Order of the British Empire (GBE)	1977; Knight Grand Cross; Civil Division
	Knight Bachelor	1973
	Order of St John (KStJ)	Knight of Justice; 1978
	Queen's Police Medal (QPM)	1965
	1939–1945 Star	
	France and Germany Star	
	Defence Medal	
	War Medal 1939–1945	
	Queen Elizabeth II Coronation Medal	1953
	Queen Elizabeth II Silver Jubilee Medal	1977; UK Version of this Medal
	Police Long Service and Good Conduct Medal	

Mark received the Freedom of the City of Westminster on 22 June 1977 and the City of London on 23 July 1979, and the Freedom of the City of New York from Mayor John Lindsay. He received the honorary degrees of Doctor of Letters from the Loughborough University of Technology in December 1976 and Doctor of Laws from the University of Liverpool on 6 July 1978.

== Post-retirement activities ==
Following his resignation, he became a director of the private security consultancy Phoenix Assurance and Control Risks. From 1970 to 1978 he was a visiting fellow of Nuffield College, Oxford. In the late 1970s, he appeared in television adverts for Goodyear tyres and his "I'm convinced they're a major contribution to road safety" became a widely used catchphrase. (This advert was parodied by both Dave Allen and Not the Nine O'Clock News.)

In 1976, Mark travelled to the United States to chair a conference designed to assist the Washington, D.C.–based Police Foundation in setting up the Police Executive Research Forum, a think tank devoted to training police executives and improving management practices.

== Personal life ==
He married Kathleen Mary Leahy in 1941; they had a son and a daughter. She died in 1997. His memoirs, In the Office of Constable, were published in 1978. He also wrote Policing a Perplexed Society, published in 1977.

Police appointments
Preceded by Neil Galbraith	Chief Constable of Leicester; 1957–1967	Succeeded by Last incumbent
Preceded by Tom Mahir	Assistant Commissioner "D", Metropolitan Police; 1967–1968	Succeeded by John Hill
Preceded by Andrew Way	Assistant Commissioner "B", Metropolitan Police; 1968	Succeeded by James Starritt
Preceded by Sir John Waldron	Deputy Commissioner of Police of the Metropolis; 1968–1972	Succeeded by John Hill
Preceded by Sir John Waldron	Commissioner of Police of the Metropolis; 1972–1977	Succeeded by David McNee
