= Alker Tripp =

English police officer

Sir Alker Tripp CBE
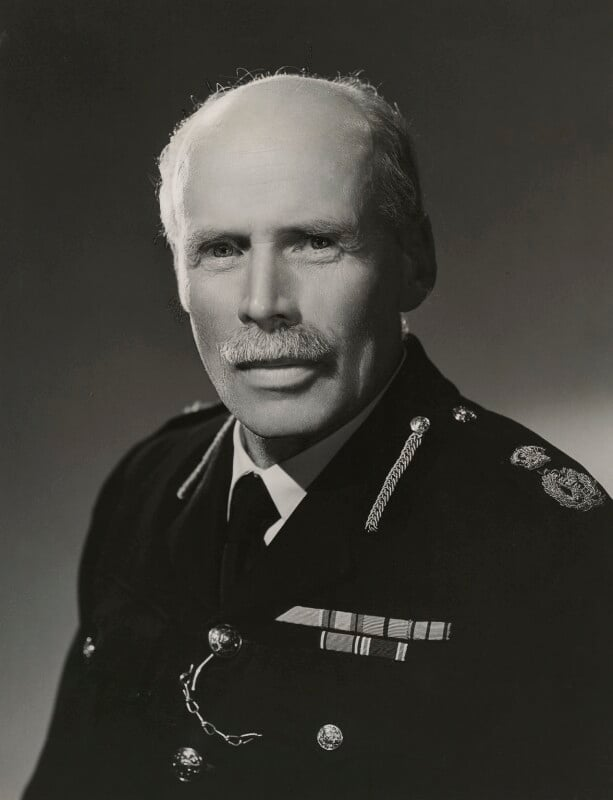
- Tripp in 1946

Assistant Commissioner of Police of the Metropolis "B"
- In office 15 January 1932 – 1 May 1947

Personal details
- Born: Herbert Alker Tripp; 23 August 1883 London, England
- Died: 12 December 1954 (aged 71)
- Occupation: Civil servant

Sir Herbert Alker Tripp CBE (23 August 1883 – 12 December 1954), usually known as Alker Tripp or H. Alker Tripp, was a senior English police official who served as an Assistant Commissioner of the London Metropolitan Police from 1932 to 1947.

== Pre-war ==
Tripp was born in Hornsey Rise, the son of George Henry Tripp, a civil servant who later became Receiver for the Metropolitan Police District. Tripp's ambition was to become an artist, but family disapproval led to him joining the civil staff at New Scotland Yard as a clerk in the Commissioner's Office on 22 December 1902.

Despite this career he never lost his interest in art, and many of his paintings were shown in the Royal Academy. More than twenty of his works were turned into posters. In 1910 he married Abigail Powell, a Dubliner - they had a son and a daughter.

He held a number of civil staff posts before being appointed chairman of the Police Recruiting Board in 1920. In this post he conceived of the idea of a police college, which was later established by Lord Trenchard. By 1928, Tripp was assistant secretary in the Metropolitan Police Office.

He was an enthusiastic yachtsman, both cruising and racing. He had a large number of articles published in the yachting press in both Britain and the United States, and during the 1920s published three books on the subject, Shoalwater and Fairway (1924), Suffolk Sea Borders (1926) and Solent and the Southern Waters (1928).

On 15 January 1932, Tripp was appointed Assistant Commissioner "B", in charge of traffic. He was the first member of the Metropolitan Police's civil staff to be appointed to this rank. (Note: At this time Assistant Commissioners were not police officers, although they wore police uniform on formal occasions.) He devoted the next fifteen years to the study of London's traffic problems, and also traffic problems of other cities throughout Europe and North America, becoming a recognised authority on the traffic control.

In 1933, he was appointed to the London and Home Counties Traffic Advisory Board. In 1938 he published Road Traffic and Its Control, which remained the only full-length study of the subject until after his death. He was appointed Commander of the Order of the British Empire (CBE) in the 1935 New Year Honours

== Wartime and after ==
The outbreak of the Second World War brought its own problems for traffic, such as road safety during the blackout, the clearance of roads after bombing raids during the Blitz, and the necessity of giving priority to military and other essential traffic. In September 1942, Tripp published a second book, Town Planning and Road Traffic, which looked ahead to postwar reconstruction. In this book he pioneered the idea of motorways in Britain.

Also in 1942, the Royal Academy invited him to become a member of its Planning Committee established to set up a scheme for London's architectural reconstruction after the war, and the following year he was appointed to the Ministry of Transport Committee on Road Safety. He supported the registration of bicycles, a policy which was not eventually endorsed by the committee.

Tripp was knighted in the 1945 New Year Honours for his services during the war. He retired from the Metropolitan Police and the London and Home Counties Traffic Advisory Committee on 1 May 1947. He also left the Ministry of Transport Committee in 1947 but remained in the Royal Academy Planning Committee until 1949. He published his fourth and final book on yachting, Under the Cabin Lamp, in 1950 and on 26 February the following year his wife died.

== Notes ==
Police appointments
Preceded by Frank Elliott	Assistant Commissioner "B", Metropolitan Police; 1932–1947	Succeeded by Henry Dalton
