= Colin Sutton (police officer, born 1938) =

British police officer

Colin Bertie John Sutton QPM (6 December 1938 – 26 March 2004) was a British police officer.

== Early life ==
Sutton was educated at King Edward VI School, Stratford-upon-Avon.

== Career ==
In 1957 he joined Warwickshire Constabulary as a Constable. He was promoted to Sergeant in 1964, Inspector in 1966, Chief Inspector in 1970, Superintendent in 1972, and Chief Superintendent in 1974. Later that year he transferred to West Midlands Police. In 1977 he was appointed Assistant Chief Constable with Leicestershire Constabulary. He obtained a Bachelor of Laws degree from University College, London in 1970.

In 1983, Sutton moved to the Metropolitan Police as a Deputy Assistant Commissioner. He was appointed Assistant Commissioner "B" (Traffic) in 1984. He was to be the last officer to hold this post, as the Metropolitan Police was reorganised in 1985. He then became Assistant Commissioner Management Support, and in 1987 was appointed Assistant Commissioner Personnel and Training. He was awarded the Queen's Police Medal (QPM) in 1985. In 1988 he became Director of the Police Requirements Support Unit at the Home Office and in 1991 Director of the Police Scientific Development Branch, also at the Home Office.

== Death ==
He retired in 1993 and died in 2004.

== Footnotes ==
Police appointments
Preceded by John Dellow	Assistant Commissioner "B", Metropolitan Police; 1984–1985	Succeeded by Last incumbent
Preceded by First incumbent	Assistant Commissioner (Management Support), Metropolitan Police; 1985–1987	Succeeded by John Smith
Preceded by Hugh Annesley	Assistant Commissioner (Personnel and Training), Metropolitan Police; 1987–1988	Succeeded by Wyn Jones
