= Douglas Webb (police officer) =

British police officer (1909–1988)

Douglas Edward Webb CVO OBE (8 October 1909 – 11 January 1988) was a British police officer in the London Metropolitan Police, who served as Deputy Commissioner of Police of the Metropolis from 1961 to 1966.

Webb was the son of Owen Cyrenius Webb, born in Coaley, Gloucestershire, who joined the Metropolitan Police and rose to the rank of superintendent. Webb was educated at Bordon Grammar School and then Devonport High School for Boys when his father moved to Devonport Royal Navy Base, Plymouth. He decided to follow his father and joined the Metropolitan Police in 1929. In 1935, he was selected for Hendon Police College, passing out with the Baton of Honour the following year.

During the Second World War, he served as public safety officer attached to the 8th Army in Italy. From 1945 to 1947 he served on the Allied Commission in Italy and Austria. In 1947 he was appointed Officer of the Order of the British Empire (OBE).

In 1952, Webb was promoted Chief Superintendent commanding Bow Street division. In 1953 he transferred to West End Central and in 1954 he was promoted Deputy Commander at Scotland Yard.

He was promoted to Commander and took over No.3 District (North-East London) on 1 December 1955. He was promoted to Assistant Commissioner "B" (Traffic) on 20 January 1957, and Assistant Commissioner "A" (Operations and Administration) in December 1958. While holding this post he established the Special Patrol Group. In 1961 he was appointed Commander of the Royal Victorian Order (CVO) and Officier of the Légion d'honneur. He retired on 8 April 1966.

== Footnotes ==
Police appointments
Preceded by D. B. Deller	Commander, No.3 District, Metropolitan Police; 1955–1957	Succeeded by Unknown
Preceded by Joseph Simpson	Assistant Commissioner "B", Metropolitan Police; 1957–1958	Succeeded by John Waldron
Preceded by Alexander Robertson	Assistant Commissioner "A", Metropolitan Police; 1958–1961	Succeeded by Ranulph Bacon
Preceded by Sir Alexander Robertson	Deputy Commissioner of Police of the Metropolis; 1961–1966	Succeeded by Sir Ranulph Bacon
