= Hugh Annesley (police officer) =

Irish-British police officer (born 1939)

Sir Hugh Norman Annesley QPM (born 22 June 1939) is a retired Irish/British police officer. He served as Chief Constable of the Royal Ulster Constabulary from June 1989 to November 1996.

Annesley was born in Dublin and educated at St Andrew's Preparatory School and the Avoca School where he played for the field hockey team. He joined the Metropolitan Police in London as a constable in 1958. Rising through the ranks to chief superintendent in 1974, he attended the Special Course (1963), Intermediate Command Course (1971) and Senior Command Course (1975) at the Police Staff College, Bramshill, before transferring to Sussex Police as Assistant Chief Constable (Personnel & Operations) in 1976. He attended the Royal College of Defence Studies in 1980 and the following year returned to the Metropolitan Police as Deputy Assistant Commissioner (Central & North West London). In 1983 he became Deputy Assistant Commissioner (Personnel) and in 1984 was director of the Force Re-organisation Team.

Under the new organisational structure, in April 1985 he was appointed Assistant Commissioner Personnel and Training (ACPT) and in 1987 became Assistant Commissioner Specialist Operations (ACSO). In 1986 he had graduated from the FBI National Executive Institute in the United States. In 1989 he took up command of the RUC, despite the post being widely expected to go to Geoffrey Dear, and held the post until his retirement in 1996.

Annesley was awarded the Queen's Police Medal (QPM) in the 1986 New Year Honours and was knighted in the 1992 New Year Honours.

== Honours ==

| Ribbon | Description | Notes |
| | Knight Bachelor (Kt) | 1992 |
| | Queen's Police Medal (QPM) | 1986 |
| | Royal Ulster Constabulary Service Medal | |
| | Police Long Service and Good Conduct Medal | |

== Footnotes ==
Police appointments
| Unknown | Assistant Chief Constable (Personnel & Operations), Sussex Police; 1976–1981 | Unknown |
| Unknown | Deputy Assistant Commissioner (Central & NW London), Metropolitan Police; 1981–1983 | Unknown |
| Unknown | Deputy Assistant Commissioner (Personnel), Metropolitan Police; 1983–1984 | Unknown |
| New post | Assistant Commissioner Personnel & Training, Metropolitan Police; 1985–1987 | Succeeded by Colin Sutton |
| Preceded by John Dellow | Assistant Commissioner Specialist Operations, Metropolitan Police; 1987–1989 | Succeeded by John Smith |
| Preceded by Sir John Hermon | Chief Constable of the Royal Ulster Constabulary; 1989–1996 | Succeeded by Ronnie Flanagan |
