= Mark Simmons (police officer) =

Mark Simmons QPM is a retired senior UK police officer.

Simmons joined the Metropolitan Police as a constable on 6 September 1982, becoming Borough Commander for Tower Hamlets and in February 2012 receiving the Queen's Police Medal. In March 2016, he was the subject of an Independent Police Complaints Commission inquiry. He was Deputy Assistant Commissioner and Head of Local Policing until December 2018, when he was appointed Assistant Commissioner of the Metropolitan Police's Frontline Policing portfolio.

He announced his retirement in February 2020 before postponing it owing to the COVID-19 pandemic. He finally retired in August 2020.

== Honours ==

Ribbon	Description	Notes
	Queen's Police Medal (QPM)	February 2012
	Queen Elizabeth II Golden Jubilee Medal	2002; UK version
	Queen Elizabeth II Diamond Jubilee Medal	2012; UK version
	Police Long Service and Good Conduct Medal	
