= Deputy Commissioner of Police of the Metropolis =

Second-in-command of London's police

- Epaulette
- Incumbent; Matt Jukes since May 2025
- Reports to: Commissioner
- Appointer: Monarch on advice of the Home Secretary
- Term length: Fixed term (maximum of 5 years, extendable)
- Formation: 1829
- Deputy: Assistant Commissioners of Police of the Metropolis
- Salary: £250,944 per annum
- Website: www.met.police.uk

The Deputy Commissioner of Police of the Metropolis, commonly referred to simply as the Deputy Commissioner, is the second-in-command of London's Metropolitan Police Service. The rank is senior to assistant commissioner, but junior by one rank to commissioner. The deputy commissioner's salary from 1 September 2010 is £214,722, making them the second highest paid British police officer.

== History ==
In addition to the assistant commissioners, the position of deputy commissioner was legally established as a separate rank in 1931. However, the assistant commissioner "A" had acted as de facto deputy for some years and had been given the courtesy title of deputy commissioner since 1922. The deputy commissioner's Crown appointment continued to be assistant commissioner of police of the Metropolis until at least the early 1970s. Sir Jim Starritt may have been the first officer to have been appointed deputy commissioner by the Crown.

== Insignia ==
The badge of rank worn on the epaulettes by the deputy commissioner is unique in the British police service, this being a crown, above two small pips placed side by side, above crossed tipstaves in a wreath. This badge was introduced in 2001; before that the deputy commissioner wore the same rank badge as the assistant commissioners – a crown over crossed tipstaves in a wreath.

== Deputy commissioners ==
Those listed in bold type became commissioner.

=== Title ===
1. Sir James Olive, 1922–1925
2. Vice-Admiral Sir Charles Royds, 1926–1931

=== Rank ===
1. The Hon. Sir Trevor Bigham, 1931–1935
2. Colonel Sir Maurice Drummond, 1935–1946
3. **Sir John Nott-Bower**, 1946–1953
4. Sir Ronald Howe, 1953–1957
5. **Joseph Simpson**, 1957–1958
6. Sir Alexander Robertson, 1958–1961
7. Douglas Webb, 1961–1966
8. Lieutenant-Colonel Sir Ranulph Bacon, 1966
9. **Sir John Waldron**, 1966–1968
10. **Robert Mark,** 1968–1972
11. John Hill, 1972
12. Sir Jim Starritt, 1972–1975
13. Sir Colin Woods, 1975–1977
14. Patrick Kavanagh, 1977–1983
15. Albert Laugharne, 1983–1985
16. **Peter Imbert**, 1985–1987
17. Sir John Dellow, 1987–1991
18. Sir John Smith, 1991–1995
19. Sir Brian Hayes, 1995–1998
20. **Sir John Stevens**, 1998–2000
21. **Sir Ian Blair**, 2000–2005
22. **Sir Paul Stephenson**, 2005–2009
23. Tim Godwin, 2009–2011
24. Sir Craig Mackey, 2012–2018
25. Sir Stephen House, 2018–2022 (acting commissioner 2021–2022)
26. Helen Ball, 2021–2022 (acting)
27. Dame Lynne Owens, 2023–2025 (interim 2022–2023)
28. Matt Jukes, May 2025–present (acting May 2025)
