= Peter Imbert, Baron Imbert =

Metropolitan Police Service Commissioner from 1987 to 1993

The Right Honourable The Lord Imbert CVO QPM KStJ DL
- Imbert in 1987

Lord-Lieutenant of Greater London
- In office 21 December 1998 – 27 April 2008
- Monarch: Elizabeth II
- Preceded by: Sir Edwin Bramall
- Succeeded by: Sir David Brewer

Commissioner of Police of the Metropolis
- In office 1 January 1987 – 31 December 1992
- Monarch: Elizabeth II
- Prime Minister: Margaret Thatcher; John Major
- Deputy: Sir John Dellow; Sir John Smith
- Preceded by: Sir Kenneth Newman
- Succeeded by: Sir Paul Condon

Member of the House of Lords
- Lord Temporal
- Life peerage 10 February 1999 – 13 November 2017

Personal details
- Born: Peter Michael Imbert; 27 April 1933 Kent, England
- Died: 13 November 2017 (aged 84)
- Profession: Police officer

Peter Michael Imbert, Baron Imbert, CVO, QPM, KStJ, DL (27 April 1933 – 13 November 2017) was Commissioner of the Metropolitan Police Service from 1987 to 1993, and prior to that appointment Chief Constable of Thames Valley Police from 1979 to 1985. Earlier in his career Imbert was involved in interrogating the Guildford Four (who were later acquitted, due to a sequence of false confessions and police deceits under Imbert's authority).

He was the Lord Lieutenant of Greater London from 1998 until 2008. He was made a life peer as Baron Imbert, of New Romney in the County of Kent in 1999, sitting as a crossbencher.

== Early life ==
Born in Kent, Imbert was educated at the Harvey Grammar School in Folkestone, spent his National Service in the Royal Air Force Police and worked for a short time with Kent County Council, before joining the Metropolitan Police in 1953 at Bow Street Police Station.

In 1956, he married Iris Dove, with whom he had three children.

== Metropolitan Police ==
In 1956, Imbert joined Special Branch, learning shorthand and Russian during his 17 years with the unit. In 1973, he was made deputy head of the Anti-Terrorist Branch, where he became an expert on European terrorist groups such as Baader-Meinhof, and gave lectures on hostage negotiation and counter-terrorism tactics.

=== Guildford Four case ===
Imbert's role in interrogating the Guildford Four, convicted for the Guildford pub bombings of 5 October 1974, came under scrutiny after the four were released from jail in 1989. Lord Chief Justice Lane described the police investigation of the Guildford Four as a sequence of false confessions and police deceits. Imbert claimed to have believed the suspects' "confessions" which were made during an interrogation where they were subjected to violence and threats.

=== Balcombe Street Siege ===
On 6 December 1975, four members of the Provisional IRA barricaded themselves in a flat in Balcombe Street, Marylebone with two hostages. The men had been responsible for a wave of bombings in London, but had been intercepted by armed police while attacking a restaurant.

Imbert was the chief negotiator over the six days of the Balcombe Street Siege, and when the situation ended peacefully with no lives lost and the four IRA members under arrest, Imbert was noted as a possible high-flyer in the police force.

== County forces ==
In 1976, Imbert left the Met and became Assistant Chief Constable, and later Deputy Chief Constable of Surrey Constabulary. In 1979, he became Chief Constable of Thames Valley Police, the youngest Chief Constable in the country at that time.

During his time at Thames Valley, Imbert allowed the BBC to make Police, a 1982 fly-on-the-wall documentary series about the police at work. The opposite of a public relations exercise, Thames Valley and the police in general came under sustained criticism when an episode of the programme showed three detectives interrogating and dismissing a rape victim. Shocked at the attitude and behaviour of his officers, and the public reaction, Imbert instigated improvements to the handling of rape cases to Thames Valley which were adopted throughout the country.

== Return to London ==
Imbert returned to London in 1985 as Deputy Commissioner, becoming Commissioner in 1987.

Building on the reforms to the Met implemented by his predecessor, Sir Kenneth Newman, Imbert began his own set of reforms called the PLUS programme, aiming to improve the corporate image and quality of service of the Met. The programme saw the Met renamed from the "Metropolitan Police Force" to the "Metropolitan Police Service", the name it has retained to this day. In addition, a Statement of Common Purpose and Values was devised.

Imbert suffered a heart attack in 1990, and took six months off duty. Further illness in 1992 led to his retirement from the police on 31 January 1993.

== Honours ==
Awarded the Queen's Police Medal (QPM) in the 1980 Birthday Honours, Imbert was knighted in 1988.

Imbert was created Deputy Lieutenant of Greater London in 1994, and Lord Lieutenant in 1998, an office he held until 2008.

He was created a life peer on 10 February 1999, taking the title Baron Imbert, of New Romney in the county of Kent.

He was appointed a Commander of the Royal Victorian Order (CVO) in the 2008 New Year Honours List.

Ribbon	Description	Notes
	Royal Victorian Order (CVO)	Commander; 2008
	Knight Bachelor (Kt)	1988
	Order of St John (KStJ)	Knight of Justice
	Queen's Police Medal (QPM)	1980
	Police Long Service and Good Conduct Medal	

Coat of arms of Peter Imbert, Baron Imbert
Crest An ancient ship Sable statant on the bulwarks thereof and in front of its mast a lion Or grasping in the dexter forepaw a sword erect Argent hilt pommel and quillons Or furled over the ship's yard arm a mainsail Azure and from the mast top a pennon flying also Azure. Escutcheon Azure between three escallop shells a portcullis flanked by two keys palewise in fess their wards outward Argent and in middle chief a dove statant wings expanded also Argent. Supporters On either side a horse Argent maned tailed and unguled Or and holding in the mouth a truncheon Azure.

== Imbert Prize ==
Lord Imbert was a patron of the Association of Security Consultants (ASC), which has awarded the Imbert Prize annually since 2005. The prize is awarded for the development of ideas for the advancement of risk and security management in the UK. It consists of three categories: 1) Best academic dissertation, 2) Most notable contribution in the security industry in the preceding year and 3) The ASC member that has made the most significant contribution to independent security consultancy. Between 1983 and 2001 Baron Imbert served on the academic consultative committee at Cumberland Lodge.

Police appointments
Preceded by David Holdsworth	Chief Constable of Thames Valley Police; 1979–1985	Succeeded by Colin Smith
Preceded by Sir Kenneth Newman	Commissioner of Police of the Metropolis; 1987–1993	Succeeded by Sir Paul Condon
Honorary titles
Preceded by The Lord Bramall	Lord Lieutenant of Greater London; 1998–2008	Succeeded by Sir David Brewer
