= Paul Condon, Baron Condon =

British police officer (born 1947)

The Right Honourable The Lord Condon CStJ QPM DL FRSA
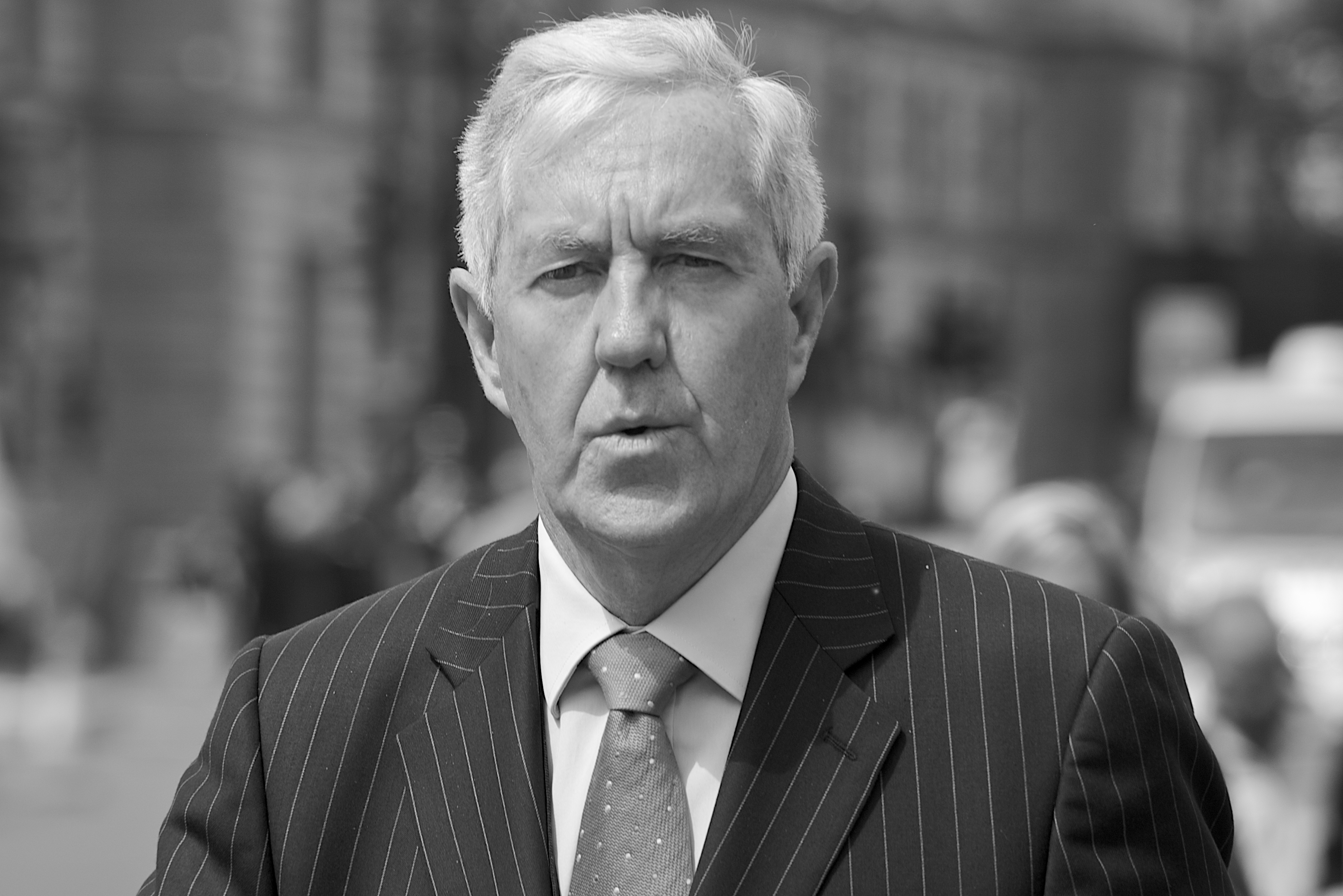

Commissioner of Police of the Metropolis
- In office 1 January 1993 – 31 December 1999
- Monarch: Elizabeth II
- Prime Minister: John Major; Tony Blair
- Preceded by: Sir Peter Imbert
- Succeeded by: Sir John Stevens

Member of the House of Lords
- Lord Temporal
- Life peerage 27 June 2001 – 21 December 2017

Personal details
- Born: Paul Leslie Condon; 10 March 1947 (age 79)

Paul Leslie Condon, Baron Condon, CStJ, QPM, DL, FRSA (born 10 March 1947) is a British retired police officer. He was the Commissioner of the Metropolitan Police from 1993 to 2000.

== Education ==
Condon read Jurisprudence at St Peter's College, Oxford and was made an Honorary Fellow in 1996.

== Career ==
=== Policing ===
Paul Condon joined the police in 1967. He became Chief Constable of Kent in 1989 and Commissioner of the Metropolitan Police in 1993 at the age of 45, the youngest person to do so, stepping down in 2000.

His tenure as head of the Metropolitan Police Service was marked by the Stephen Lawrence case, which became a major controversy. The subsequent public Macpherson Report found the force to be "institutionally racist" and that the failure to arrest and successfully prosecute those believed guilty brought about many changes in the way the Metropolitan Police investigated murder within the capital. In 1995, Condon attracted controversy and media attention for stating that most muggers are black.

Other challenges Condon faced were sectarian violence over the Irish partition, the funeral of Diana, Princess of Wales, the millennium celebrations and police corruption, which led to 70 people being charged, 100 police officers suspended and changes to legislation.

=== Post-police career ===
Just six weeks after his retirement from the Metropolitan Police, Condon became head of the International Cricket Council's anti-corruption unit, investigating the game's betting controversies.

In March 2007, Mohammed Al Fayed launched legal action in France against Lord Condon, alleging he deliberately withheld evidence from the French inquiry into the death of the Princess of Wales in 1997. Condon was also named to assist Jamaican Police in their inquiry into the strangulation murder of Pakistan's World Cup cricket coach, Bob Woolmer.

==== Director of G4S PLC ====
Condon was deputy chairman of the board of G4S until he retired from the board in 2012.

== Honours ==
Condon is a Companion of the Institute of Management. He was awarded the Queen's Police Medal for distinguished service (QPM) in 1989. He was knighted by Queen Elizabeth II at Buckingham Palace on 20 July 1994. He was appointed Commander of the Venerable Order of Saint John (CStJ) in April 1994.

On 27 April 2001, it was announced that a life peerage would be conferred upon him. He was created Baron Condon, of Langton Green in the County of Kent. He sat as a crossbencher in the House of Lords until his retirement on 21 December 2017.

Coat of arms of Paul Condon, Baron Condon
Crest Salient over two oars in saltire blades upwards Sable a horse Argent unguled maned and tailed Or. Escutcheon Sable three piles reversed embowed inwards couped at the apex the base of that in the centre surmounting the bases on those either side Argent each charged with two bars compony counter-compony Azure and Argent and ensigned with an estoile Or. Supporters On either side a Meerkat sejant Azure gorged with a chain pendant therefrom a portcullis Or. Motto Honour, Service, Courage Badge A meerkat sejant Azure supporting with the forefeet a portcullis chained Or.

Ribbon	Description	Notes
	Knight Bachelor	1994
	Venerable Order of Saint John (CStJ)	Commander; 1994
	Queen's Police Medal (QPM)	1989
	Police Long Service and Good Conduct Medal	

Police appointments
Preceded by Sir Peter Imbert	Commissioner of Police of the Metropolis; 1993–2000	Succeeded by Sir John Stevens
Orders of precedence in the United Kingdom
Preceded by The Lord Hannay of Chiswick	Gentlemen; Baron Condon	Followed by The Lord Browne of Madingley
