= Kenneth Newman =

British Chief Constable and Police Commissioner (1926–2017)

Sir Kenneth Newman GBE CStJ QPM

Commissioner of Police of the Metropolis
- In office 1982–1987
- Monarch: Elizabeth II
- Prime Minister: Margaret Thatcher
- Preceded by: Sir David McNee
- Succeeded by: Sir Peter Imbert

Chief Constable of the Royal Ulster Constabulary
- In office 1976–1980
- Preceded by: Sir Jamie Flanagan
- Succeeded by: Sir Jack Hermon

Personal details
- Born: Kenneth Leslie Newman; 15 August 1926 Hackney, London, England, UK
- Died: 4 February 2017 (aged 90)
- Profession: Police officer

Sir Kenneth Leslie Newman GBE CStJ QPM (15 August 1926 – 4 February 2017) was a senior British police officer. He was Chief Constable of the Royal Ulster Constabulary (RUC) from 1976 to 1980, and Commissioner of the Metropolitan Police from 1982 to 1987. He is best known for initiating a major reform and restructure of the Metropolitan Police during his tenure as Commissioner and for seeing the RUC replace the British Army as the dominant security force in Northern Ireland during his tenure as Chief Constable.

== Early life and career ==
Newman was born on 15 August 1926 in Hackney, London and grew up in North Bersted. He joined the Royal Air Force in 1942, three days after his 16th birthday. After basic training, Newman trained to be a wireless operator at No. 1 Radio School RAF when he was nicknamed "Jankers" but he did not complete the course and remustered to become a Mechanical Transport Driver. Completing his training, Newman served for two years with the RAF Far East Air Force.

== Career ==
=== Life in the Met ===
On his return to England, he promptly joined the Palestine Police Force in the British Mandate of Palestine, where he served as a uniformed officer before being seconded to the Palestine Special Branch as a detective. When the Palestine Police were disbanded in 1948, the Metropolitan Police sent several recruitment officers from London to convince interested officers to transfer to the Met – Newman signed up and returned to London shortly afterwards where he was stationed at Bow Street.

Newman rose up the ranks quickly: promoted to Sergeant in 1953; a Detective Inspector with the Vice Squad; Chief Inspector at Southwark in 1963 and Superintendent and Chief Superintendent at Gerald Road from 1965. Noted by his colleagues and superiors as a high-flyer, Newman had developed several important initiatives including a traffic warden scheme and, having been present and having taken a very active role on the 'front line' during the riot, reviewing police public order tactics during the major anti-Vietnam War demonstration outside the US Embassy in Grosvenor Square, which had taken place on 17 March 1968.

After undertaking external studies at the University of London, Newman received a Bachelor of Laws with Honours in 1971, and was promoted to Commander, serving in various capacities at New Scotland Yard.

=== Northern Ireland ===
In 1973, Newman applied for the position of Deputy Chief Constable of the Royal Ulster Constabulary (RUC) in Northern Ireland and was promoted to Chief Constable in May 1976. Using his experience in public order policing, and his penchant for reform, Newman was instrumental in transforming the RUC from a "poor cousin" of the British Army in the region, to the dominant security force in Northern Ireland, police force. He introduced the policy of Ulsterisation. Newman was knighted in the 1978 New Year Honours after his work with the RUC.

=== Bramshill ===
Newman was recalled to England in 1980 and served for three years as Her Majesty's Inspector of Constabulary and Commandant of the Police Staff College, Bramshill, where he once again honed his skills in public order policing and management reform.

=== Commissioner ===
Newman's appointment as Commissioner of the Metropolitan Police in 1982 came at a time when the Met was under intense public and media scrutiny. Newman subsequently initiated one of the most major reform campaigns the Met had ever undertaken. Among his initiatives were:

- expanding the controversial Special Patrol Group into the Territorial Support Group by merging it with the District Support Units
- the establishment of "Area-based policing", divesting the centralised officers and resources of New Scotland Yard into eight geographical areas
- publishing Principles of Policing to replace the traditional Standing Orders, with the assistance of the new MPS Policy Committee, changing the fundamental guidelines for policing in London for the first time in 150 years

Newman spoke out against the prevalence of Freemasonry in the police, although a police Freemason's Lodge, the Manor of St James, was set up and flourished shortly after his comments. He retired in 1987, his reforms paving the way for his successor, Sir Peter Imbert, to implement further reforms known as the PLUS Programme. He took directorships with Control Risks, Automated Security Holdings and the Automobile Association.

== Death ==
Sir Kenneth Newman died on 4 February 2017 at the age of 90, presumedly in Bournemouth, Dorset where his funeral was held. He was survived by his wife Eileen (née Freeman), their son, Laurence, daughter, Melanie, and three grandsons.

== Honours ==

Ribbon	Description	Notes
	Knight Grand Cross of the Order of the British Empire (GBE)	1987 Birthday Honours
	Knight Bachelor	1978 New Year Honours
	Commander of the Order of St John (CStJ)	1984
	Queen's Police Medal (QPM)	1982 Birthday Honours
	War Medal 1939–1945	
	General Service Medal	With "Palestine 1945–48" Clasp
	Queen Elizabeth II Silver Jubilee Medal	1977; UK Version of this Medal
	Royal Ulster Constabulary Service Medal	
	Police Long Service and Good Conduct Medal	

== Sources ==
- Fido, Martin; Keith Skinner (1999). The Official Encyclopedia of Scotland Yard. London, UK: Virgin Books. ISBN 0-7535-0515-0.

Police appointments
Preceded by Sir James Flanagan	Chief Constable of the Royal Ulster Constabulary; 1976–1980	Succeeded by Sir John Hermon
Preceded by Sir David McNee	Commissioner of Police of the Metropolis; 1982–1987	Succeeded by Sir Peter Imbert
