= Deputy chief constable =

Police officer rank in the United Kingdom

UK Police Deputy Chief Constable Epaulette

Deputy chief constable (DCC) is the second highest rank in all territorial police forces in the United Kingdom (except the Metropolitan Police, in which the equivalent rank is deputy assistant commissioner, and City of London Police, in which the equivalent rank is assistant commissioner, both of which wear the same insignia as a DCC). The British Transport Police, Ministry of Defence Police, Civil Nuclear Constabulary, and the Isle of Man Constabulary each also has a DCC.

Until 2006, each force could only have one DCC, who would normally be second-in-command to the chief constable. However, Schedule 2 of the Police and Justice Act 2006 amended the Police Act 1996 to permit more than one DCC within each force.

The DCC ranks above the assistant chief constables (ACC). The role of the DCC varies from force to force. In some smaller forces (usually those with only a single ACC or no ACC), they take responsibility for territorial policing, but in most forces the role covers corporate functions including professional standards.

The rank was abolished on 1 April 1995, following recommendations made in the Sheehy Report, later confirmed by the Police Act 1996, although officers already holding the rank could continue to hold it. Most forces continued to designate one of the ACCs as "designated deputy" to the chief constable. The Home Office officially reintroduced the rank on 1 January 2002 under the terms of the Criminal Justice and Police Act 2001.

== Insignia ==
The rank badge worn by a DCC consists of a bath star ("pip") over crossed tipstaves within a wreath, similar to the insignia of a major-general in the British Army.

== See also ==
- Police ranks of the United Kingdom
