= Red Cross Diamond =

205.07 carat yellow diamond

The Red Cross Diamond is a canary-yellow 205.07-carat, cushion-shaped cut diamond which is among the largest known cut diamonds. The diamond was auctioned off in 1918 to support the British Red Cross Society. It has a Maltese cross visible in the diamond.

== Classification ==
The diamond is referred to as the Red Cross Diamond and it is classified as "fancy intense yellow" in color. It is commonly referred to as canary-yellow. It has a cushion shaped cut and a Maltese cross faceted at its base. The Maltese cross feature in the diamond was considered a rarity and in 1918 only two other diamonds were known to have the feature: the Regent Diamond being one. The diamond is 205.07 carats (41.014 grams) and it is a brilliant cut diamond with "nearly flawless VS2 clarity". It is considered to be one of the world’s largest diamonds. In 1918 it was called the largest yellow diamond in the world.

== History ==
In 1901 the diamond was found in the De Beers controlled Kimberley Mine at Griqualand West, Cape Colony (in modern South Africa). The rough diamond is said to have weighed between 370 and 380 carats. It was bought by "The Diamond Syndicate" and when it reappeared in 1918, it was a cut diamond. The stone was cut in Amsterdam. It was sent to Christie's as a donation, to be auctioned to benefit the Red Cross. It came to be known as the Red Cross diamond after it contributed to the fund of the British Red Cross Society. The diamond was displayed prior to the auction and people could view it after paying a fee. Prior to the 1918 auction the News-Democrat, an American newspaper, stated, "If it brings less than a million dollars, it will be a bargain, as diamonds go."

At the auction the diamond was purchased by the London firm S. J. Phillips for £10,000 and the proceeds went to fund the British Red Cross Society during World War I.

The owner of the diamond attempted to resell it at auction in Tokyo in July 1973. Pre-auction estimates anticipated a US$5 million sale. Twenty buyers attended the auction and a bid of 570 million yen was rejected. The diamond was then auctioned by Christie's (Geneva) in November 1973 and it sold to an American businessman for 1.8 million Swiss francs.

On May 11, 2022, the Red Cross Diamond was purchased for 14.2 million Swiss francs at Christie's Geneva. This was the third time Christie's auctioned the diamond. The consignor of the diamond stated that part of the proceeds from the auction would be donated to the International Red Cross Movement.

== See also ==
- Diamond color
- Golden Eye Diamond
- Nassak Diamond
- The Rock (diamond)
- Tiffany Yellow Diamond
- List of diamonds
