= The Rock (diamond) =

World's largest white diamond ever auctioned

The Rock is the world's largest white diamond ever auctioned. It is a nearly colorless 228.31 carat pear-shaped diamond mined in South Africa c. 2000. The diamond is described as larger than a golf ball, and it was auctioned in 2022 for 21.9 million USD.

== Classification ==
The Rock is a 228.31-carat white diamond which has been graded by the Gemological Institute of America. It has G color, VS1 clarity. The color of white diamonds can range from D to Z: D-color is the highest grade for white diamonds, and it is the rarest and most expensive. The Rock is G-color, which is the fourth whitest level of white diamonds. It is the highest grade in the near-colorless color range and only professionals can see a slight tint of color in a G-colored diamond. The diamond is 61.3 grams (2.2 oz) and it has dimensions of 5.4 centimetres (2.1 in) by 3.1 centimetres (1.2 in). It is described as "larger than a golf ball.

== History ==
The Rock was mined and polished in South Africa c. 2000. It is cut in a symmetrical pear-shape. The diamond was displayed in Dubai, Taipei and New York City before arriving at Christie's in Geneva for auction.

On May 11, 2022 Christie's Geneva auctioned the diamond and it was sold for 21.9 million USD. It was the largest white diamond ever auctioned. Previously the largest white diamond ever auctioned had a mass of 163.41 carats and realized a price of 33.7 million USD.

The owner was from North America and was anonymous. The New York Post described the sellers as a family of jewelry collectors who had the diamond made into a necklace at Cartier. The buyer who purchased the diamond at Christie's Geneva was an unnamed private collector.

== See also ==
- Cullinan Diamond
- Diamond color
- Golden Eye Diamond
- Golden Jubilee Diamond
- Nassak Diamond
- The Enigma Diamond
- Tiffany Yellow Diamond
- List of diamonds
- Black Falcon Diamond
