= Indian Independence Medal =

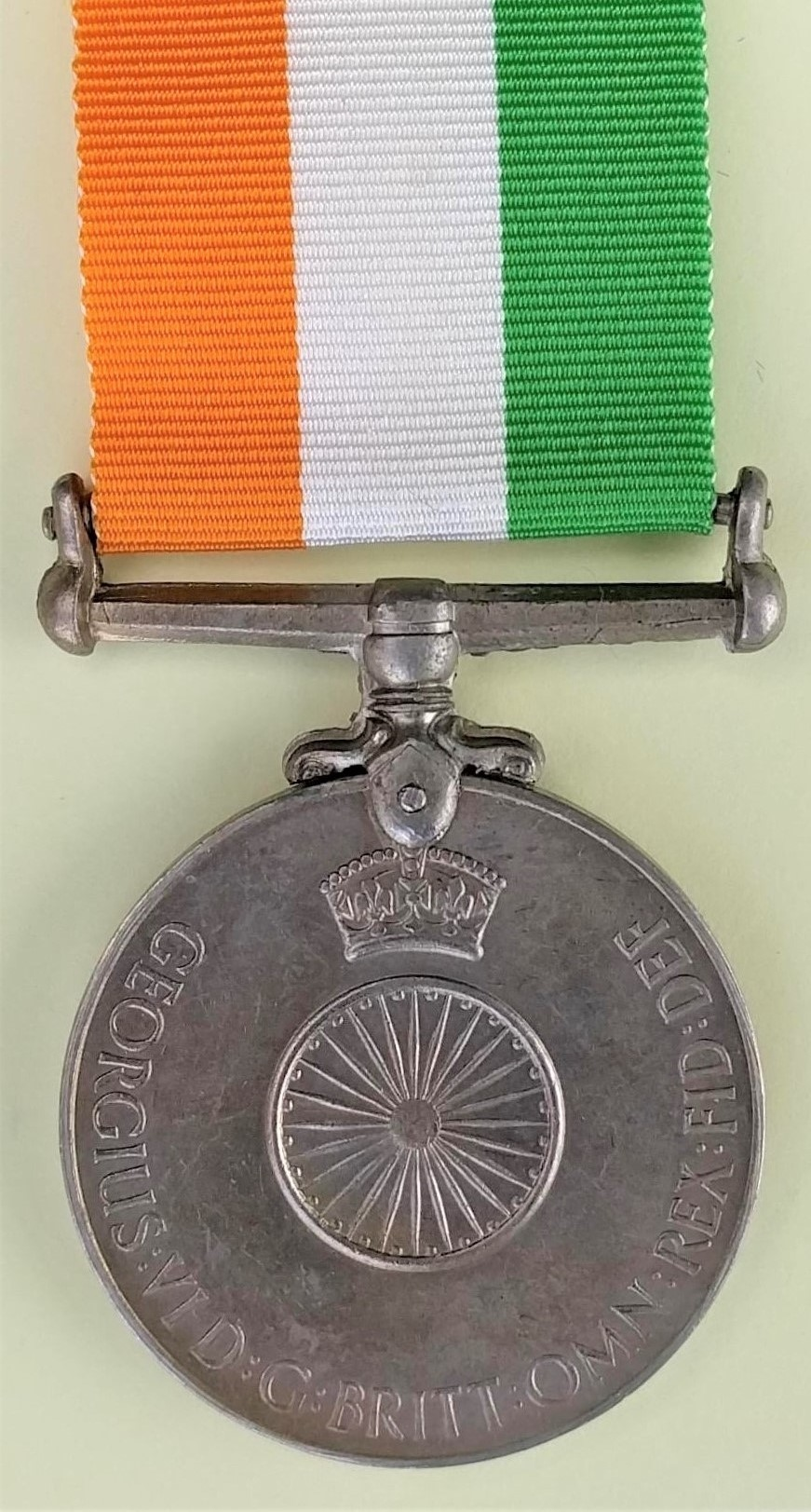
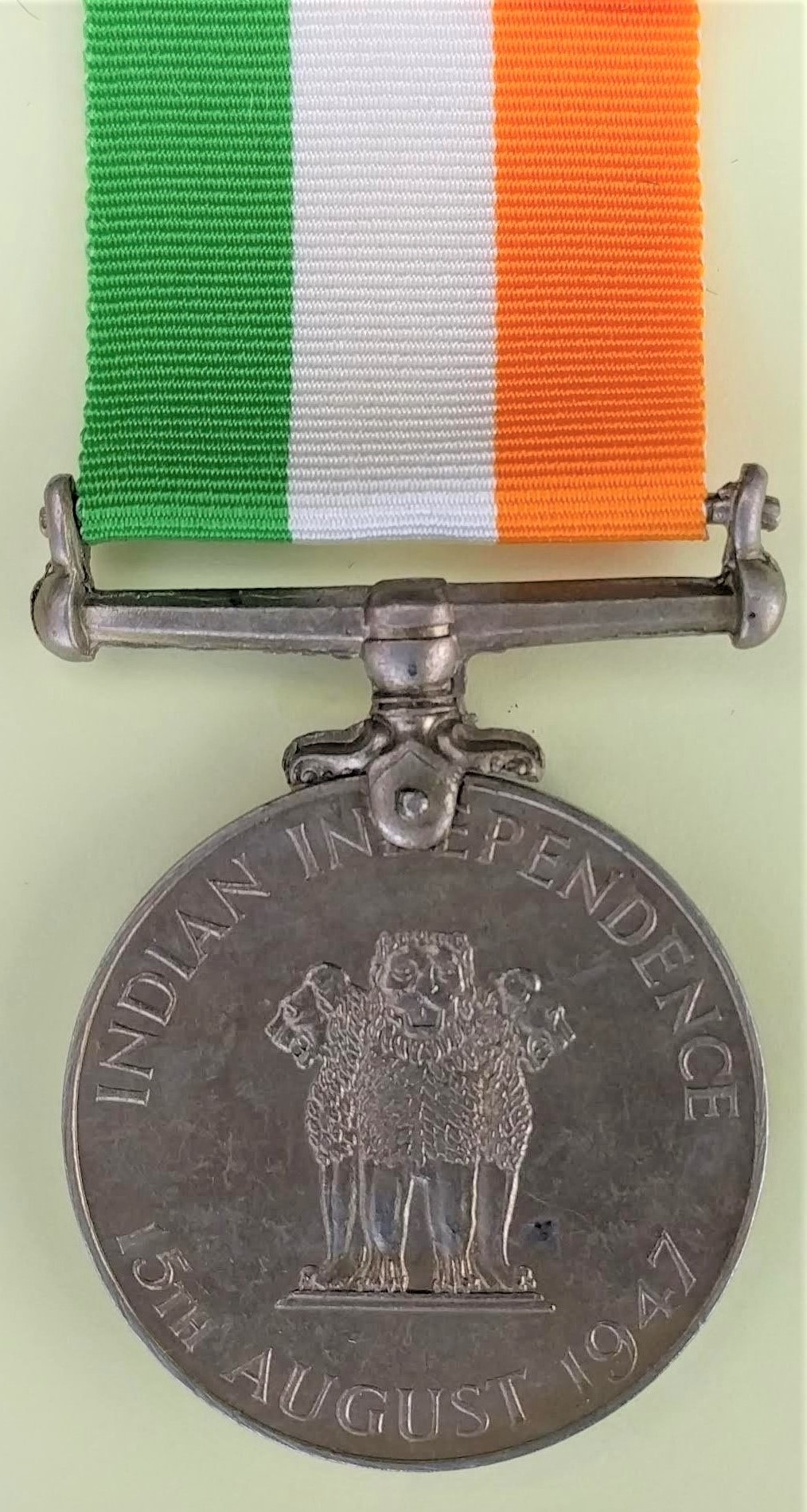
- Obverse and reverse of the medal
- Type: Commemorative medal
- Awarded for: Indian Independence
- Description: Silver disk, 36mm diameter.
- Presented by: the Dominion of India
- Eligibility: All members of the Indian armed forces serving on 15 August 1947; British service personnel who remained in India after Independence serving on 1 January 1948
- Clasps: None
- Established: October 1949
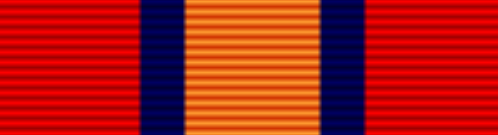
- Ribbon bar of the Indian Independence Medal Ribbon bar of the Indian Police Independence Medal

Precedence
- Next (higher): Union of South Africa Commemoration Medal (United Kingdom); Territorial Army Medal (India)
- Next (lower): Pakistan Medal (United Kingdom); Indian Police Independence Medal (India)

The Indian Independence Medal was instituted by the Dominion of India and approved by King George VI by way of a Royal Warrant dated 21 July 1948. It was a commemorative medal for service with the Indian armed forces at the time of independence in August 1947. Attached British personnel were eligible.

It was awarded to all those who, on 15 August 1947, were members of the armed forces of India, including the forces of princely states that acceded to Indian rule before 1 January 1948. British military personnel who remained in India after independence and who served with Indian forces up to 1 January 1948 qualified, although those with British units awaiting repatriation did not.

The medal is circular, 1.4 in (36 mm) in diameter and made of cupronickel. The obverse has the Ashoka Chakra wheel surmounted by a Tudor Crown, surrounded by the inscription GEORGIUS VI D:G: BRITT:OMN: REX: FID DEF. The reverse shows the Ashoka lions, which is the State Emblem of India, with the words INDIAN INDEPENDENCE above and the date 15th AUGUST 1947 below. The 1.25 in (32 mm) ribbon consists of three equal stripes of saffron, white and green, the colours on the flag of India. The medal is worn on the left chest, with the saffron furthest from the left shoulder. In most cases, the name and details of the recipient were impressed on the edge of the medal.

A Police Independence Medal was instituted in 1950 for award to all serving members of India's police forces. The design is similar to the Indian Independence Medal. The obverse shows the Ashokan Lions above the Indian National motto Truth Alone Prevails in Sanskrit ( सत्यमेव जयते ) with the words INDIAN INDEPENDENCE above and 26th JANUARY 1950 below — the day India became a republic. The reverse shows the chakra wheel with a lotus border above and the word POLICE below. The ribbon is red with a blue-edged orange central stripe.

== See also ==
- Awards and decorations of the Indian Armed Forces
- Pakistan Medal
