= Police Service of Northern Ireland Service Medal =

- Medal Ribbon for PSNI Service Medal
- Type: Service medal
- Awarded for: At least 5 years' service
- Presented by: the United Kingdom
- Eligibility: Members of the Police Service of Northern Ireland
- Established: 20 January 2020
- First award: 8 December 2021

The Police Service of Northern Ireland Service Medal is a medal created to honour the service of members of the Police Service of Northern Ireland (PSNI). The medal was established in January 2020 and first awarded in December 2021.

== Criteria ==
The Police Service of Northern Ireland Service Medal is awarded to all officers of the PSNI who have completed five years' reckonable service since 25 February 2009 – the date that the threat level was raised to "severe". Those individuals who, as a result of injury or disability sustained in the execution of their duty in the PSNI, died or were required to leave the force are also eligible.

As the medal is awarded to only police officers, a similar award – the Police Service of Northern Ireland Service Medallion – was instituted at the same time for all police staff.

== Description ==
The medal is circular and made of silver coloured metal. The obverse bears the 2015 Jody Clark Crowned Effigy of Elizabeth II, surrounded by the royal titles. The reverse depicts the badge of the Police Service of Northern Ireland below the words PRO MUNERIS, surmounting emblems of shamrock and laurel The ribbon of the medal is sky blue with a central band of dark green.

Approximately 10,000 medals and medallions were issued to December 2021.

== See also ==
- Royal Ulster Constabulary Service Medal
