= Liquidity Services =

American e-commerce surplus asset management company

Liquidity Services, Inc.
- Type: Public
- Traded as: Nasdaq: LQDT; S&P 600 component
- Industry: Surplus asset management E-commerce
- Founded: 1999; 27 years ago
- Founders: William P. Angrick III; Jaime Mateus-Tique; Ben Brown
- Headquarters: Bethesda, Maryland, United States
- Key people: William Angrick III (CEO)
- Brands: GoIndustry DoveBid; GovDeals; IronDirect; Machinio; Network International; Liquidation.com; Secondipity sierraauction.com
- Number of employees: 687
- Website: liquidityservices.com

Liquidity Services, Inc. is an American e-commerce company providing surplus asset management services through a network of online marketplaces. It serves businesses and government agencies by facilitating the resale of surplus, returned, and end-of-life goods. Founded in 1999 and headquartered in Bethesda, Maryland, United States.

== History ==
The company was founded in 1999 by William P. Angrick III, Jaime Mateus-Tique, and Ben Brown, in 1999, launching initially as Liquidation.com, a B2B auction marketplace.

In 2001, it acquired SurplusBid.com, gaining access to contracts with the United States Department of Defense.

Liquidity Services went public on NASDAQ on February 23, 2006, with an initial valuation of $76.9 million. Prior to going public, Liquidity Services opened online auctions for European corporations and government agencies to sell their surplus goods on the international market.

From 2008 to 2012, the company expanded through acquisitions, including GovDeals, Network International, the remarketing division of Jacobs Trading Company, and GoIndustry DoveBid.

In 2015, it lost major contracts with Walmart and the Department of Defense for surplus vehicle auctions, though it retained the DoD's scrap property contract.

In September 2016, the company launched IronDirect, a marketplace for construction equipment.

It acquired Machinio in 2018, Bid4Assets in November 2021, and Sierra Auction in 2024.

== Services ==
Liquidity Services operates several e-commerce platforms including:

- Liquidation.com – Surplus retail and consumer goods
- GovDeals – Government surplus auctions
- AllSurplus – Centralized marketplace across categories
- Bid4Assets – Government real estate auctions
- Machinio – Used industrial machinery listings
- IronDirect – Construction equipment
- Secondipity – Returned and refurbished consumer products
- Sierraauction.com– Vehicle and equipment auctions
- GovLiquidation.com,

Its marketplaces support over 500 product categories across sectors such as:

- Government
- Construction
- Energy
- Industrial manufacturing
- Biopharmaceutical
- Electronics manufacturing
- Automotive industry
- Consumer goods
- Retail
- Fast-moving consumer goods
- Aerospace
- Defense

== See also ==
- Online marketplaces
- Reverse logistics
