= Voluntary Medical Service Medal =

Long service medal of the British Red Cross and St Andrew's First Aid

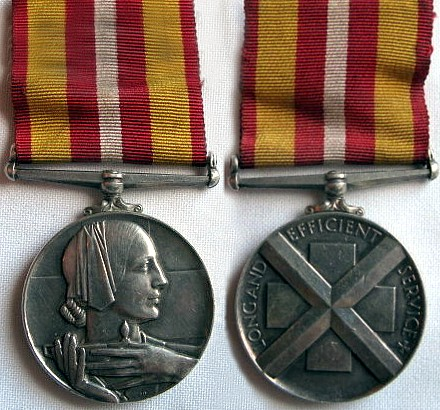
- Type: Long service medal
- Awarded for: 15 years of service
- Country: United Kingdom
- Presented by: the Monarch of the United Kingdom and the Dominions
- Eligibility: Volunteers of the British Red Cross or St Andrew's First Aid
- Post-nominals: None
- Clasps: For each subsequent 5 years of service
- Established: 1932
- Ribbon bar of the medal

Precedence
- Next (higher): Service Medal of the Order of St John
- Next (lower): Women's Royal Voluntary Service Medal

The Voluntary Medical Service Medal is a medal awarded by St Andrew's First Aid and (formerly) by the British Red Cross. It was instituted in 1932 at the direction of George V.

== Criteria ==
To qualify for the medal, a member must accrue fifteen years' continuous efficient service as a first aid volunteer in either the Red Cross or St Andrew's providing a minimum of ten hours field service per year. Service for the medal was retrospective to the creation of Voluntary Aid Detachments in 1909.

== Appearance ==
The medal is 36 millimetres (1.4 inches) in diameter and was designed by Percy Metcalfe. The obverse bears a symbolic representation of Florence Nightingale carrying a lamp. The reverse features a design of both the Geneva and St Andrew's crosses to denote the two qualifying organisations. Between the upper arms of the St Andrew's Cross is the text LONG AND EFFICIENT SERVICE. The medal was originally made of silver, later of silver plated copper, and since the 1960s of copper-nickel. It is suspended from a straight swivel bar and hangs from a ribbon of red with yellow stripes at the edges and a thin white stripe in the centre.

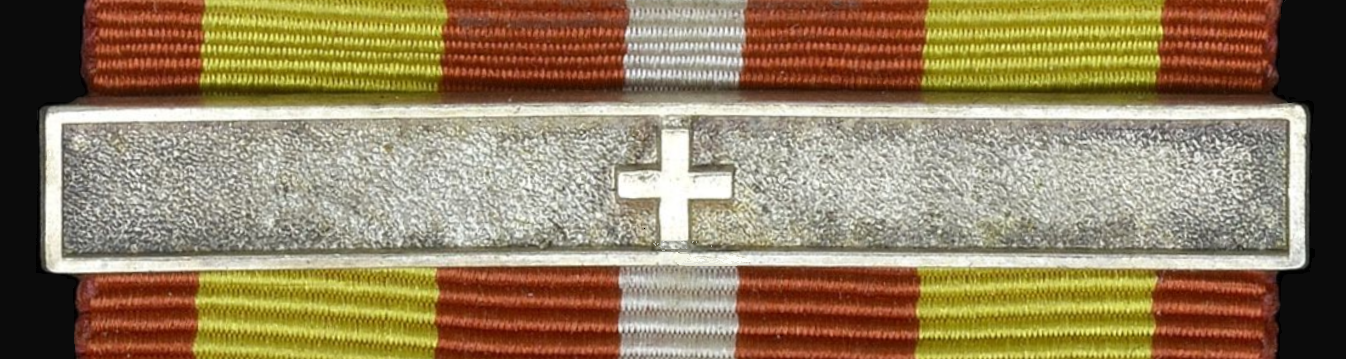
Second award clasp for service with the Red Cross

On the suspension ribbon of the medal, clasps embellished with the Geneva cross for Red Cross service or the St Andrew's cross for St Andrews First Aid service are worn to denote five additional years of qualifying service. In undress uniform, on the ribbon of the medal, one silver Geneva or St Andrew's cross emblem is added to the medal ribbon for five additional years of service. At twenty years of additional service the silver emblems are replaced by a silver-gilt emblem. Up to four silver-gilt emblems can replace the silver type to denote 25, 30, and 35 years of additional service in the applicable voluntary organisation.

Twelve years' "active and efficient service" as a mobile member of Voluntary Aid Detachments, or as a member of the Military Hospitals Reserve, was recognised by the award of a silver bar-brooch, "superscribed 'V.A.D.' or 'M.H.R.' respectively, surmounted by the Royal Crown". Recipients of the bar-brooch who had also been awarded the Voluntary Medical Service Medal (or the Service Medal of the Order of St John) wore the bar-brooch the top of the medal ribbon (whereas other recipients wore it separately, on the left breast, below any other medals). Each further period of six years' qualifying service was recognised with the award of a bar, which would be worn immediately below the bar-brooch on the medal ribbon. In undress uniform, when medals were not worn, the bar-brooch was replaced by a "token", marked 'V.A.D.' or 'M.H.R.', worn on the medal ribbon.
