= St Andrew's First Aid =

Charity based in Scotland

- Logo of St Andrew's First Aid
- Formation: 1882
- Type: Charitable organisation
- Headquarters: St Andrew's House, 48 Milton Street, Glasgow, G4 0HR
- Location: Scotland
- Chairman of Council: David Davidson
- Revenue: £2.5m per annum (2016)
- Website: www.firstaid.org.uk

St Andrew's First Aid is a charity based in Scotland. Founded in 1882, St Andrew's Ambulance Association was Scotland's first ambulance service. From 1967, the St. Andrew's Scottish Ambulance Service was the sole contractor for the provision of the ambulance service, until 1974, when the National Health Service (NHS) was reorganised and St Andrew's ambulance role was absorbed into the Scottish Ambulance Service. The St Andrew's association continued as a provider of first aid services and training, changing their trading name.

== History ==
=== Formation and early years ===
In 1882, St Andrew's Ambulance Association was formed in Glasgow by a group of local doctors and businessmen who were concerned by the rapid increase in accidents resulting from traffic and modern machinery. First aid and casualty transportation classes were conducted and Scotland's first ambulance was bought by the association in April 1882, which served Glasgow and the surrounding area providing first aid and transportation to hospital to accident victims. In the following years, the number of calls the association responded to grew so as by 1886 there were six ambulances stationed in towns throughout Scotland.

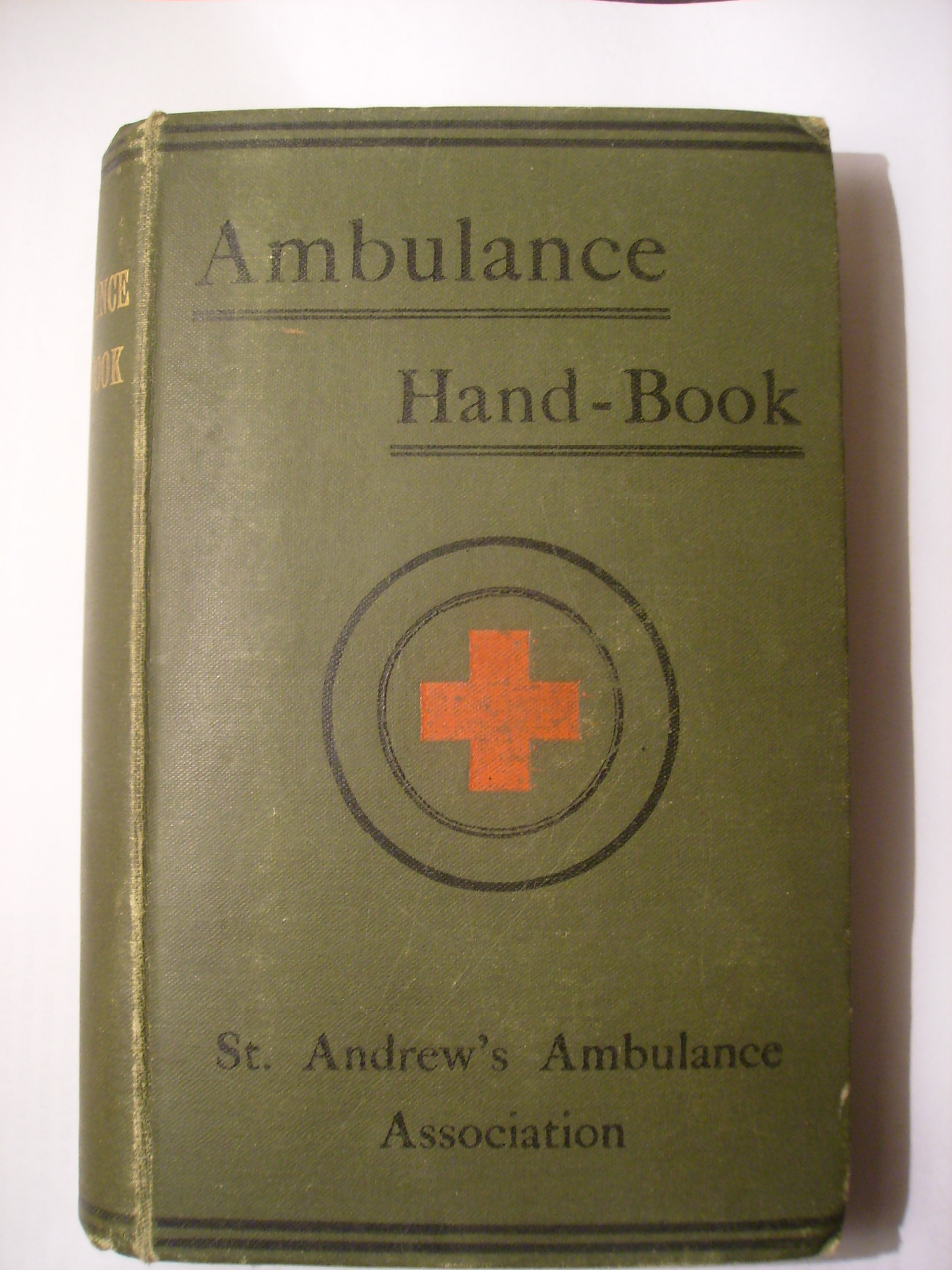
Dr George Beatson's Ambulance Hand-book (5th ed.)

In order to make teaching more uniform, in 1891 the association published Dr George T. Beatson's Ambulance Hand-book that provided a concise overview of anatomy, physiology, injuries, first aid treatment and casualty transportation. The book remained the association standard text for over 40 years as it was updated and republished.

At the turn of the century, the association underwent two major changes: In 1899, a Royal Charter was granted by Queen Victoria that changed the association from a collection of individuals to a legally recognised single entity and in 1904 the St Andrew's Ambulance Corps was formed to bring together the various ambulance groups around the country under a single administration.

=== First World War ===
Within 48 hours of war being declared, the Corps was able to entirely staff all of Scotland's military hospitals, freeing the regular staff for service. In addition to this, St Andrew's were also able to assemble two Foreign Service Units (which served in France and in hospital ships), a Military Nursing Service (derived from females Corps members) and a transport service alongside the British Red Cross attending to wounded soldiers from hospital trains. Whilst all of this was happening, St Andrew's usual civilian work of first aid training and casualty transportation continued unabated (albeit the additional services placed strain on the association's funds).

=== Between World Wars ===
After the First World War ended, the British Red Cross Society presented the association with a large number of motor ambulance wagons that were no longer required by the military. This allowed a complete ambulance service to be extended throughout Scotland. In order to meet the needs of the expanding organisation, the association commissioned plans for permanent Headquarters to be built in the North Street, Glasgow. This building opened in 1929 and its facilities included a garage, workshops, offices, classrooms and a drill hall. By 1939, the association was granted Royal Patronage, with The Queen, later known as The Queen Mother, as patron.

=== Second World War ===
The association faced the task of preparing the Scottish public for air raids, and it responded by providing classes in Aid Raid Precautions, Anti-Gas Precautions and First Aid for air raid casualties. As the First World War, St Andrew's was active in the war effort: the Corps provided thousands of staff for the Civil Nursing Reserve, transportation of casualties after air raids and providing first aid and nursing training to school children. In Glasgow, the association provided accommodation for the newly formed Blood Transfusion Service, as well as arranging free transport for donors.

== Key dates ==
- 1882: Founded in Glasgow. First Aid classes were organised, 'stretcher stations' were placed in chemist shops and an ambulance was bought.
- 1891: The association published Dr George Beatson's Ambulance Handbook.
- 18 April 1899: A Royal Charter was granted by Queen Victoria.
- 1904: St. Andrew's Ambulance Corps was formed.
- 1918: The St. Andrew's Ambulance Association were donated ambulances from the British Red Cross Society, which were unused after the First World War.
- 1928: The association's headquarters opened in North Street, Glasgow.
- 1937: Royal Patronage was granted, with The Queen Mother as patron.
- 1946: St Andrew's Ambulance Association and the British Red Cross Scottish Branch agree to pool ambulance resources only (all other activities of both organisations remain independent) and form St. Andrew's and Red Cross Scottish Ambulance Service.
- 1948: The National Health Service was formed, and the St. Andrew's and Red Cross Scottish Ambulance Service was contracted to provide the ambulance service.
- 1954: The first joint First Aid manual of St. Andrew's Ambulance Association, St. John Ambulance and British Red Cross Society was published.
- 1967: The British Red Cross Society withdrew from the ambulance service, which became St. Andrew's Scottish Ambulance Service, the sole contractor for the provision of the ambulance service.
- 26 June 1970: The Queen Mother opened the association's new National Headquarters in Milton Street, Glasgow. The relocation had been necessary due to the construction of the M8 motorway.
- 2 January 1971: St. Andrew's Ambulance Association were faced with the disaster at Ibrox stadium.
- 1974: The National Health Service was reorganised, and the St. Andrew's Ambulance Association withdrew from contracting to provide an ambulance service (St. Andrew's Scottish Ambulance Service). The Scottish Ambulance Service was taken over by Common Services Agency of the NHS. St Andrew's Ambulance Association continued to provide First Aid services and training.
- 5 April 1976: An Australian Branch was established in Victoria.
- 1978: The Corps celebrated its 75th anniversary.
- 1982: The association celebrated its centenary, with a service of thanksgiving at Glasgow Cathedral, attended by the Queen Mother.
- 1993: The association bought its first defibrillator, with training provided by Scottish Ambulance Service.
- 1996: The association was granted its coat of arms.
- 2004: The Corps celebrated its centenary.
- 2006: The organisation underwent a change in corporate identity, renaming its public facing areas as St Andrew's First Aid
- 2010: The headquarters underwent a massive refurbishment.

== First Aid organisation ==
National Headquarters in Glasgow

The St Andrew's national headquarters is at Cowcaddens in Glasgow. It has the stated aims of promoting the teaching of first aid, supplying first aid equipment and supplies and providing event cover. 2,000 volunteers were registered with St Andrew's Ambulance Corps in 2014, and the organisation relies on these people to be able to provide event cover. In 2016 the charity had an income of £2.5 million. The board of trustees is in overall control.

== First aid courses ==
St Andrew's offers a variety of courses to the general public and in the workplace:

Public courses include:

- Emergency First Aid (a four-hour course, designed to give a brief overview
- Emergency Resuscitation (a two-hour course that teaches basic life support skills)
- Sports Injuries First Aid
- Baby and Child First Aid
- Anaphylaxis Awareness (a four-hour course)

Workplace courses include:

- First Aid at Work (an 18-hour-long course)
- Emergency First Aid at Work ( one-day course)

== St Andrew's Ambulance Corps ==
The corps was formed in 1904, in order to bring together the various ambulance corps that had formed and to allow these people to improve their first aid skills by practising together and being available at public gathering. The aim of the corps has not changed over the past 100 years, and today it still exists and provides an opportunity for people to practise and use their first aid skills.

=== Structure ===
The corps is made up from over 69 Corps Companies, each of which are based within a specific area and come under the administration of one of the executive committees. Overall control of the corps comes from the association, with national headquarters providing administrative support.

A Corps Company consists of volunteer members who attend regular training meetings, go on duty to provide first aid cover at events and oversee the general running of the company. There are a number of different roles within a Corps Company:

- Associate Member – does not hold a Standard First Aid certificate, but is involved in the running of the company in some other way (fundraising, accounts, administration etc.).
- Member – holds a Standard First Aid Certificate, and attends events as a first aider as well helping in the running of the company.
- Secretary – performs general administrative duties such as taking minutes at AGMs or distributing correspondence from the association.
- Treasurer – administers company accounts, as well as paying expenses to members (for travel to/from duties).
- Public Duty Officer – organises the first aid cover required at duties, and keeps a record of casualties treated.
- Commandant – in overall charge of the company.
- Deputy Commandant – supports the work of the Commandant
- Assistant Commandant – this position (or positions) is only present in larger companies, in which the Commandant and Deputy may require more support in running of the company.
- Section Leader – larger companies may also have section leaders who are responsible for certain roles, and groups of members, allowing commandants to focus on the overall running of the company.
- Honorary Medical Officer – medically qualified person, who advises the company on medical and first aid matters and can also attend public duties.
- Trainer/Assessor – a member who has undertaken the Trainer/Assessor course, so that they can provide training to the Corps Company as well as to the public.
- Community Engagement Facilitator - a member who delivers first aid talks and demonstrations to teach members of the public, Community groups and Schools First aid skills
- Youth Leaders – responsible for training and leadership of the youth groups in the company.

The Ambulance Association trained volunteer members in ambulance work and first aid and provided certificates of proficiency.

=== Further training ===
Members of the corps are constantly updating their first aid skill at regular meetings, however there is also opportunity to undertake further training courses:

- Automated External Defibrillation – allows members to use an AED whilst on duty. Which is now standard for all members
- Moving and Handling – covers safe handling and transport of casualties. Techniques taught include scoop stretcher, spinal board, cervical collar, trolley bed, carry chairs and carry sheets.
- Leadership Course – allows members to take up the positions of Commandant, Deputy Commandant or Assistant Commandant.

There is also training in radio communications, as radios are used by members at many duties in order to help speed up communications, and better mobilise members and equipment in response to incidents.

=== Duties ===
The corps supplies members to duties across the country, ranging from village fêtes to international sporting events and music festivals. For example, St Andrew's provides cover at two of Scotland's largest stadiums (Hampden Park, Ibrox Stadium), as well as major festivals such as TRNSMT and Live at Loch Lomond.

=== Uniform ===
Backpack style first aid kit

St Andrew's first aiders are required to wear uniform when on duty and are encouraged to wear it whenever they are representing the organisation. The uniform comprises black combat trousers, blue polo shirt (with association logos and First Aid branding), and soft shell jacket. It is worn on public duties.

In addition, there are high visibility jackets, hard hats, ski hats, waterproof jackets and backpack style first aid kits. Grey polo shirts are worn by support volunteers and fundraising teams.

== Relationship with other organisations ==
St Andrew's, St John Ambulance and the British Red Cross Society collectively form the Voluntary Aid Societies. Together, the organisations produce the official First Aid Manual in the United Kingdom.

Following an agreement in 1908, St John Ambulance ceased to operate in Scotland and St Andrew's ceased to operate in England. St Andrew's enjoys good relations with the British Red Cross, and they often work in partnership at larger duties such as T in the Park.

== Honours ==
- The Voluntary Medical Service Medal may be earned by volunteers with St Andrew's First Aid after 15 years service with a Clasp for each additional period of five years service. This medal is also awarded by the British Red Cross in England, Scotland, Wales, Northern Ireland, the Isle of Man and many British Overseas Territories.
