= Union of South Africa Commemoration Medal =

Military and civil commemorative medal

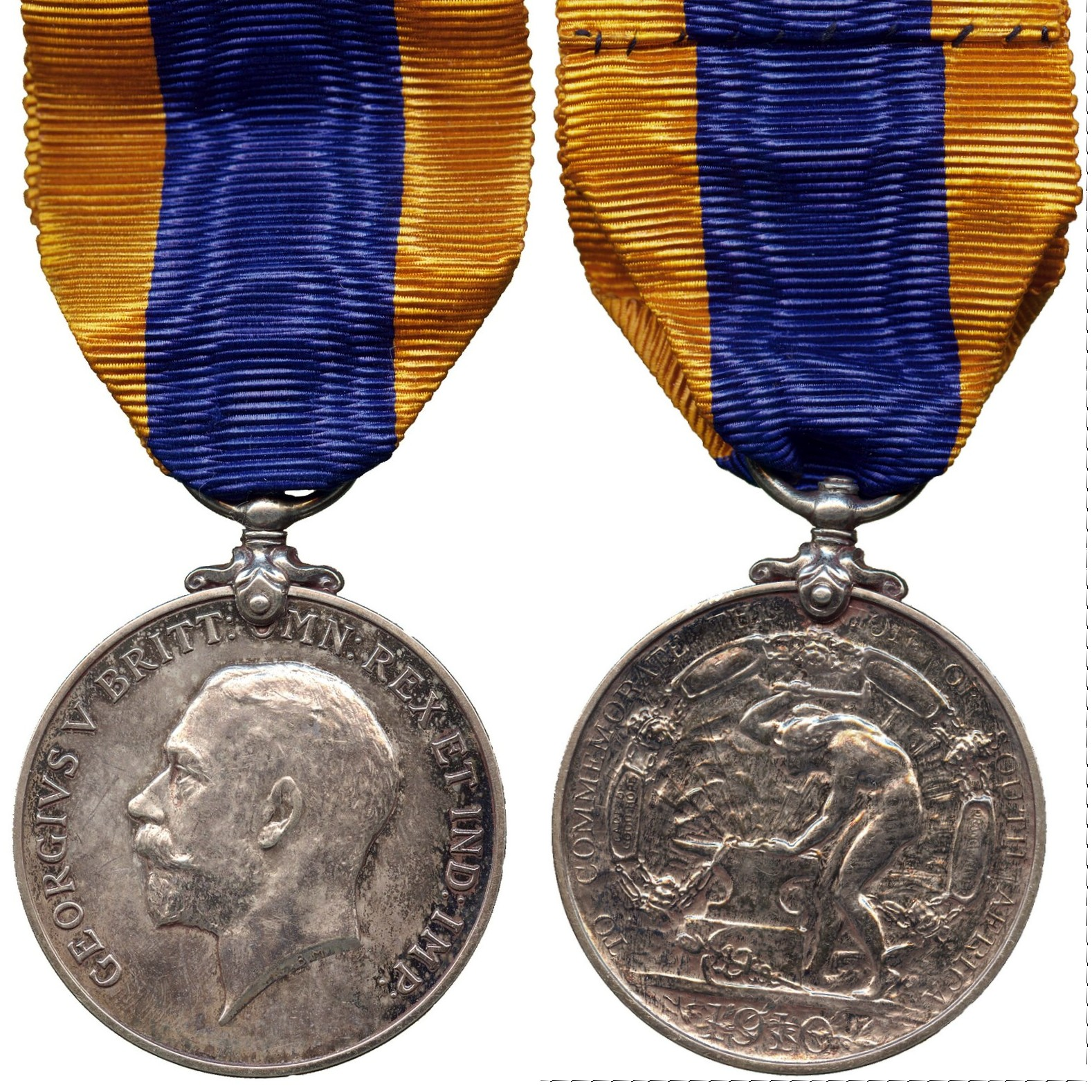
- Type: Commemorative medal
- Awarded for: Commemoration of the opening of the first Union Parliament
- Country: Union of South Africa
- Presented by: the Monarch of the United Kingdom and the British Dominions, and Emperor of India
- Eligibility: Military and civil leaders
- Established: 1910
- First award: 1910
- Final award: 1911

Highlights
- Total: 580
- Ribbon Bar

South African order of wear
- Next (higher): Air Efficiency Award
- Next (lower): South African Medal for War Services

The Union of South Africa Commemoration Medal is a military and civil commemorative medal which was awarded to commemorate the opening of the first Union Parliament by the Duke of Connaught and Strathearn in 1910. It may be considered as the first of many independence medals which were instituted throughout the Commonwealth during the 20th century.

== Institution ==
The Union of South Africa Commemoration Medal was instituted by King George V in terms of Royal Warrant of 3 October 1910, published in Government Gazette no. 59 dated 29 November 1910. The medal was struck to commemorate the opening of the first Parliament of the Union of South Africa by the Duke of Connaught and it was awarded to military and civilian leaders who took part in the ceremonies to establish the Union of South Africa from the unification of the former Colonies of the Cape of Good Hope, Natal, Transvaal and the Orange River Colony.

== Award criteria ==
The medal was awarded to members of the military and naval forces as well as certain civilian leaders who took a prominent part in the proceedings, and only on the recommendation of the Principal Secretary of State for the Colonies. A roll was to be kept and was to be closed six months after the date of the warrant, after which no award could be made except with Royal Approval in very special circumstances.

== Order of wear ==
In the order of wear prescribed by the British Central Chancery of the Orders of Knighthood, the Union of South Africa Commemoration Medal takes precedence after the Northern Ireland Prison Service Medal and before the Indian Independence Medal.

=== South Africa ===
With effect from 6 April 1952, when a new South African set of decorations and medals was instituted to replace the British awards used to date, the older British decorations and medals which were applicable to South Africa continued to be worn in the same order of precedence but, with the exception of the Victoria Cross, took precedence after all South African decorations and medals awarded to South Africans on or after that date. Of the official British medals which were applicable to South Africans, the Union of South Africa Commemoration Medal takes precedence as shown.

- Preceded by the Air Efficiency Award.
- Succeeded by the South African Medal for War Services.

== Description ==
The medal, which was awarded unnamed, was struck in silver and is 36 millimetres in diameter with a raised rim.

Obverse

The obverse bears the effigy of King George V, facing left and surrounded by the legend: "GEORGIVS V BRITT:OMN:REX ET IND:IMP:". The medal is attached with a swiveling claw suspension affixed to the medal by means of a pin through the upper edge of the medal. The suspender is fitted with a large ring.

Reverse

The reverse depicts the god Mercury, as the god of commerce and prosperity, forging links of a chain on an anvil, with four links each bearing the name of a Province of the Union of South Africa, "CAPE OF GOOD HOPE", "NATAL", "TRANSVAAL" and "ORANGE RIVER". The year "1910" underneath is entwined by an olive branch. Around the circumference and encircling the image is the inscription "TO COMMEMORATE THE UNION OF SOUTH AFRICA".

Ribbon

The ribbon is 38 millimetres wide, with two 10 millimetres wide orange bands separated by an 18 millimetres wide dark blue band.

== Recipients ==
The Roll shows that altogether 580 medals were awarded. Of these, 21 went to members of the Royal Navy, 52 to the British Army, 41 to South African forces, 465 to civilians of which 31 were women, and one to a member of foreign services.
