= Northern Ireland Prison Service Medal =

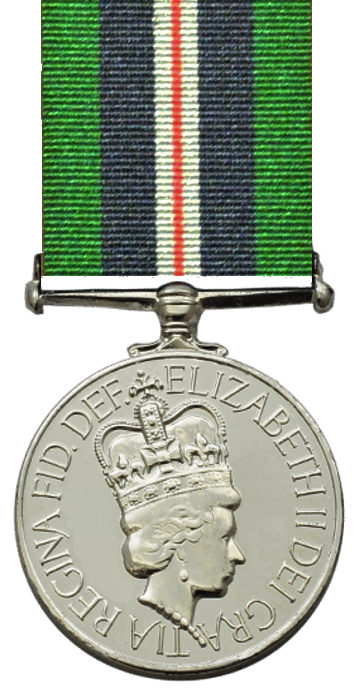
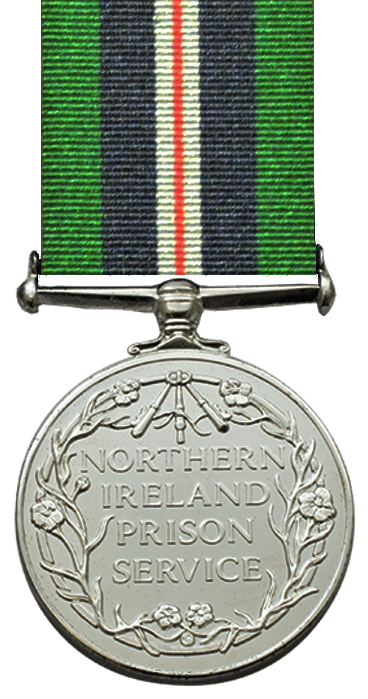
- Obverse and reverse of medal, with operational ribbon
- Type: Service medal
- Awarded for: 5 years of meritorious service
- Presented by: the United Kingdom
- Eligibility: Prison officers, and other staff of the Northern Ireland Prison Service
- Status: Currently awarded
- Established: 15 January 2002
- Northern Ireland Prison Service Medal ribbon Northern Ireland Prison Service Medal ribbon for prison officers

Order of Wear
- Next (higher): Royal Ulster Constabulary Service Medal
- Next (lower): Union of South Africa Commemoration Medal

The Northern Ireland Prison Service Medal was established by Royal Warrant on 15 January 2002. Agreed to in principle by the Queen in 2000, the medal was created to recognise Northern Ireland Prison Service personnel who had served in the "difficult and often dangerous conflict" during the Troubles. This included the murder of 28 prison staff, with dozens more wounded and many forced to move home due to intimidation.

== Eligibility ==
The medal was awarded to Northern Ireland Prison Service personnel who, between 1 January 1971 and 29 September 2002, completed five years meritorious full or part-time service in a prison establishment. Those qualifying included both operational staff – prison officers and governors – and non-operational personnel – including chaplains, instructors and medical and maintenance staff. Headquarters personnel did not qualify, unless they had specifically been placed in danger or had made an exceptional contribution to prison establishments. The five years service requirement did not apply to those killed or retired due to injury.

No provision was made for ribbon clasps to recognise further periods of service.

Service that counted towards the Northern Ireland Prison Service Medal could also count towards the award of the Imperial Service Medal and, after its creation in 2010, the Prison Services Long Service Medal.

Up to April 2009 a total of 3,412 medals were awarded, 3,211 to prison officers and governors, and 201 to civilian staff. A small number of late claims were made after this date.

== Appearance ==
The Northern Ireland Prison Service Medal is circular and made of cupro-nickel. The obverse bears the effigy of Queen Elizabeth wearing the Imperial State Crown, and surrounded by an appropriate inscription. The reverse depicts a design of the flax flowers surrounding the inscription Northern Ireland Prison Service surmounted by three keys. It is inscribed on the rim with the full name and prison service number of the recipient.

The medal is suspended from a ribbon 1.25 inches (32 mm) wide. It is composed of equal stripes of green and navy blue flanking a stripe of sky blue. For operational staff – prison officers and governors – a thin stripe of red is centred on the sky blue stripe.
