= Tiffany Yellow Diamond =

One of the largest yellow diamonds ever discovered

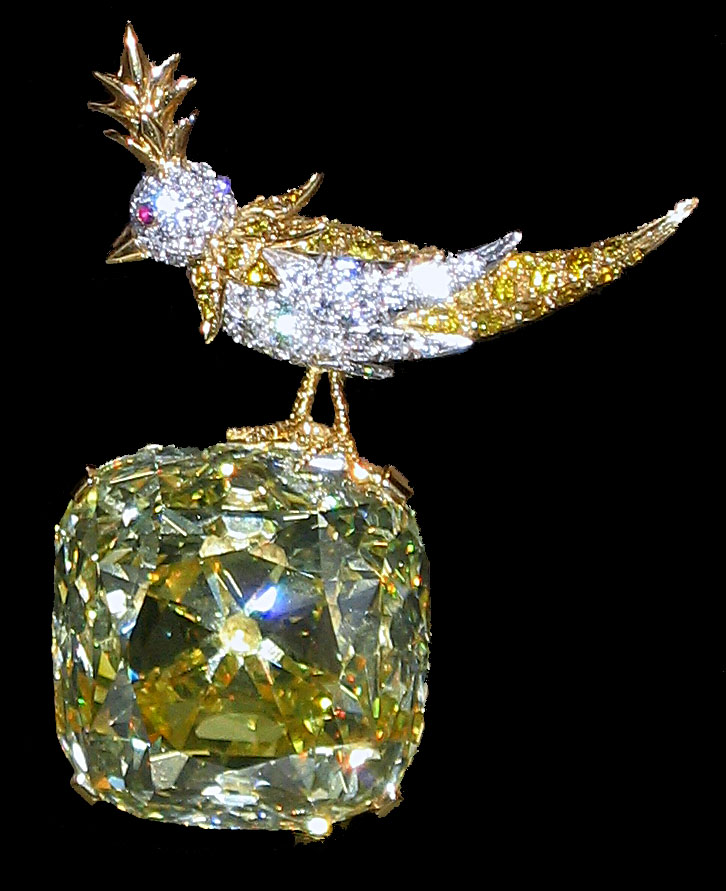
- Tiffany Yellow Diamond in "Bird on a Rock"
- Weight: 128.54 carats (25.708 g)
- Color: Yellow
- Cut: Modified antique cushion brilliant
- Country of origin: South Africa
- Mine of origin: Kimberley Mine
- Discovered: 1877
- Cut by: George Frederick Kunz
- Owner: Tiffany & Co.

The Tiffany Yellow Diamond is one of the largest yellow diamonds ever discovered. Its carat weight was originally 287.42 carats (57.484 g) in the rough when discovered in South Africa around 1878. The subsequent cutting reduced it to 128.54 carats (25.108 g). Acquired by Tiffany & Co., the stone was fashioned under the eye of George F. Kunz as a cushion-shaped Stellar Cut Brilliant, but with an additional third step in the crown, bringing the total facets from the traditional 58 to 90. Kunz later wrote that the “unprecedented number of facets was given the stone not to make it more brilliant, but less brilliant. The stone was of yellow colour, and it was thought better to give it the effect of a smothered, smoldering fire than one of flashing radiance.”

The stone was never sold, and instead became part of Tiffany’s branding as a seller of high-end jewelry and diamonds. Its permanent home has been the firm’s flagship store in Midtown Manhattan, New York City.

== History ==
Discovered in South Africa around 1878, probably in the French-owned concession at Kimberley, the stone was purchased for $18,000 by the Paris agent of New York jeweler Charles Tiffany. The cutting team in Paris was supervised by the gemologist George Frederick Kunz (1856–1932), then a twenty-three-year-old at the start of his career who had just joined the firm. Kunz and his team studied the stone for a year before cutting began. The cut diamond was little publicized upon its arrival in New York in 1880, allegedly due to Tiffany’s fears that it might be just one among many yellowish diamonds recently coming from South Africa. However, its size and deep yellow color soon set it apart.

Never sold, the gem became part of Tiffany’s branding as a seller of high-end jewelry and diamonds, normally displayed at its main Manhattan store, but periodically showcased elsewhere. It was exhibited at the 1893 Chicago World's Fair, the Pan-American Exposition in 1901, the Chicago Century of Progress in 1933-34 and the New York World's Fair in 1939-40. In 1971 it was brought to South Africa for the centennial of the Kimberley Mine, and in 1986 it was shown in London when Tiffany reopened their branch in Old Bond Street. In 2007, the gem was exhibited at the Smithsonian National Museum of Natural History in Washington, D.C. Jeffrey E. Post, the museum's gem curator, at the time noted that it was the largest diamond on display in the U.S. (The famous Hope Diamond in the Smithsonian collection is, at 45.5 carats, only one-third the mass.)

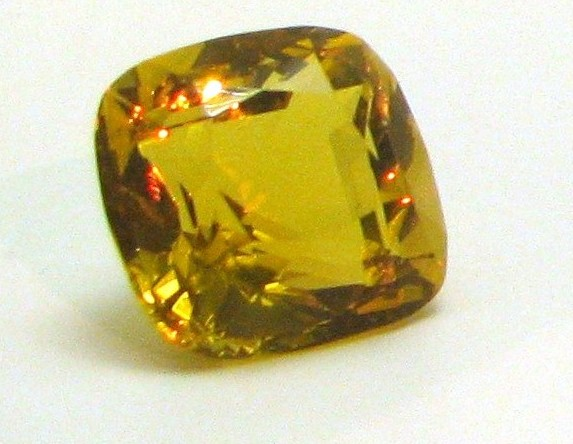
A copy of the unmounted diamond

The diamond was not placed in a setting until 1957, when it was mounted in a necklace of white gold and diamonds which was worn by Mary Whitehouse at the Tiffany Ball held in Newport, Rhode Island. In 1961 the designer Jean Schlumberger, hired by Tiffany’s a few years previously, mounted the diamond in his iconic Ribbon Rosette necklace, which was worn by Audrey Hepburn in publicity photographs for the film Breakfast at Tiffany's. For the Schlumberger 1995 retrospective at the Musée des Arts Décoratifs in Paris, the diamond was re-set in his Bird on a Rock. In 2012, it was set in a new necklace of white diamonds to mark the firm’s 175^{th} anniversary. In 2023, Tiffany announced a new, fifth, setting.

The Tiffany Yellow has been worn by only four persons. In addition to Whitehouse and Hepburn, it was worn with the 2012 necklace by Lady Gaga at the 2019 Academy Awards and by Beyoncé in a 2021 Tiffany ad campaign. Gal Gadot wore a Tiffany-made replica of the diamond and necklace in the 2022 film Death on the Nile, where the theft of the jewel is a key element in the plot.

== See also ==
- Golden Eye Diamond
- Diamond color
- Nassak Diamond
- Red Cross Diamond
- List of diamonds
