= Bid4Assets =

American online real estate auction website

- Company type: Public
- Founded: 1999; 26 years ago
- Founders: Norman Understein; Rick Zitelman; Jay French
- Headquarters: Silver Spring, Maryland, United States
- Key people: Jesse Loomis (President)
- Owner: Liquidity Services
- Website: bid4assets.com

Bid4Assets was the first online real estate auction website to operate in the United States. Established in 1999, it auctions distressed real estate and personal property for private investors and federal and local government.

Based in Silver Spring, Maryland, the company has served the United States Marshals, the U.S. Department of Treasury and over 100 counties throughout the United States. To date, Bid4Assets has sold over 125,000 properties nationwide and grossed over $1 billion in sales.

In November 2021 Bid4Assets became a wholly owned subsidiary of Liquidity Services, operators of the world's largest B2B e-commerce marketplace.

== Notable auctions ==
Notable auctions conducted by Bid4Assets include:

- In 2000, Bid4Assets became the first online auction site to be awarded a GSA contract. That same year, Bid4Assets began conducting forfeiture auctions for federal law enforcement, which became the first public auctions to be conducted entirely over the internet.
- In June 2000, the presidential yacht, USS Sequoia, sold for $2 million to Gary Silversmith.
- In September 2000, Bid4Assets conducted the first-ever internet-based tax sale for Kern County, California. Bid4Assets has conducted tax sales via online auction for 50 of the 58 counties in California.
- The original Watergate lock
- The Beastie Boys Grand Royal record label,
- In July 2002, Bid4Assets conducted an internet-based tax sale for Washtenaw County, Michigan. This was Michigan's first-ever online tax-foreclosed property auction.
- In 2005, Bid4Assets sold the Sandshaker Lounger, Package Store and Sandwich Shop, a popular Pensacola, Florida hangout. The property was forfeited to the United States Marshals Service as a result of Operation Sandshaker.
- In 2006, Bid4Assets auctioned a 1990 Mercedes-Benz C-11 race car driven by Michael Schumacher.
- In January 2008, Bid4Assets conducted Clark County, Washington's first internet-based tax sale. Bid4Assets has conducted tax sales via online auction for more than half of the counties in Washington.
- In October, 2010, Bid4Assets hosted one of the largest online real estate auctions in the history of the United States in which over 13,000 properties located in Wayne County, Michigan, were auctioned due to unpaid real estate taxes.
- In 2011, the Wayne County Treasurer's Office netted a record $32 Million from the Bid4Assets online auction of 14,000 tax-foreclosed properties, double the amount collected the previous year.
- In September 2011, the Golden Eye Diamond, a flawless 43.51-carat Fancy Intense Yellow diamond sold for $2,843,623 to Jerre Hentosh. The auction was a federal forfeiture conducted on behalf of the United States Marshals Service.
- Bid4Assets has also pioneered internet-based tax defaulted property sales in Idaho, Nevada, Virginia and Missouri.
- In 2015, as part of a San Francisco tax sale, Bid4Assets auctioned a private cul-de-sac in one of the most exclusive neighborhoods of San Francisco. Tina Lam and Michael Cheng purchased the property for $90,000. The story received national attention and the city ultimately reversed the sale.
- In June 2020 Bid4Assets conducted Utah's first internet-based tax sale for Iron County, Utah. All 135 properties either received a bid or were redeemed for payment of taxes.
- In October 2020, Bid4Assets pioneered Pennsylvania's first internet-based sheriff sale for Montgomery County, Pennsylvania. Montgomery County's sheriff was quoted as stating “COVID-19 was clearly the precipitating factor and an online auction is a safer way to go in the current health crisis." Bid4Assets also pioneered virtual sheriff’s sales in Washington and Oklahoma.
