= South African Medal for War Services =

South African military campaign medal for service in the Second World War

- Type: Service medal
- Awarded for: Voluntary & unremunerated service
- Country: Union of South Africa
- Presented by: the Monarch of the United Kingdom and the Dominions of the British Commonwealth, and Emperor of India
- Eligibility: Whether British subjects or not
- Campaign: Second World War 1939–1945
- Established: 1945

Highlights
- Total: 17,500
- Ribbon bar

Order of wear
- Next (higher): Women's Royal Voluntary Service Medal
- Next (lower): Colonial Special Constabulary Medal

The South African Medal for War Services is a South African service medal for voluntary unpaid service in support of the war effort between 6 September 1939 and 15 February 1946, during the Second World War.

== Institution ==
In addition to British war medals awarded to combatants from all members of the British Commonwealth, several Commonwealth nations augmented the British awards by establishing their own service medals, all distinctive in design, purpose and criteria.

The South African Medal for War Services was instituted by a Royal Warrant dated 29 December 1945, countersigned and sealed at Cape Town on 6 February 1946.

== Award criteria ==
The medal was awarded for part-time unremunerated voluntary service in support of the war effort between 6 September 1939 and 15 February 1946.

Altogether 17,500 medals were awarded to people of both sexes, irrespective of whether or not they were British subjects. The requirement was a minimum of two years’ service, of which at least one year was continuous, rendered voluntarily and without pay within or outside the borders of the Union of South Africa, in one or more of the officially recognised voluntary non-military organisations, such as the Red Cross and the Governor-General's War Fund, with the proviso that five or more hours were worked every week. The medal was also issued with a Protea leaf in bronze, to be affixed to the ribbon, to denote a mention in despatches or a King's Commendation.

== Description ==
The medal was struck in silver and is 36 millimetres in diameter and 3 millimetres thick at the raised rim. It is affixed to the suspender by means of claws and a pin through the upper edge of the medal. It was awarded unnamed.

Obverse

The obverse depicts the years "1939" over "1945", encircled by a wreath of protea flowers, all of which are surrounded by the name of the medal in English and Afrikaans, "SOUTH AFRICA" and "SUID-AFRIKA" above and "FOR WAR SERVICES • VIR OORLOGDIENSTE" below.

Reverse

The reverse has the Coat of Arms of the Union of South Africa.

Ribbon

The ribbon is 32 millimetres wide, with three equal width bands of dark orange, white and dark blue.

== Order of wear ==
In the order of wear prescribed by the British Central Chancery of the Orders of Knighthood, the South African Medal for War Services takes precedence after the Women's Royal Voluntary Service Medal and before the Colonial Special Constabulary Medal.

=== South Africa ===
On 6 April 1952 the Union of South Africa instituted its own range of decorations and medals. These new awards were worn before all earlier British decorations and medals awarded to South Africans, with the exception of the Victoria Cross, which still took precedence before all other awards. Of the official British medals applicable to South Africans, the South African Medal for War Services takes precedence as shown.

- Preceded by the Union of South Africa Commemoration Medal.
