= Women's Royal Voluntary Service Medal =

Women's Royal Voluntary Service Medal (Women's Voluntary Service Medal)
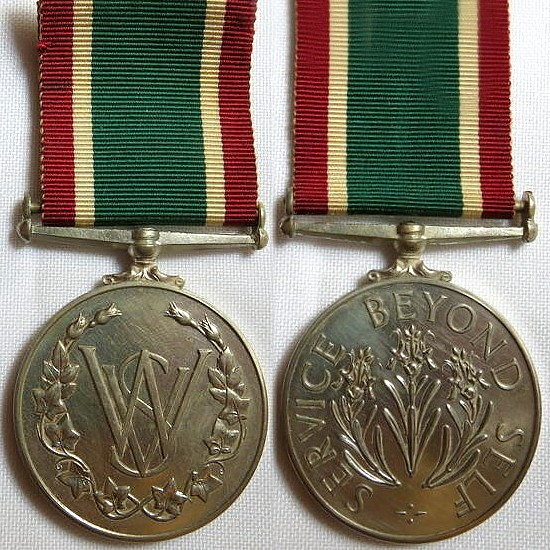
- Type: Long service medal
- Awarded for: Fifteen years service
- Country: United Kingdom
- Presented by: the Monarch of the United Kingdom and the Commonwealth realms
- Eligibility: Royal Voluntary Service members
- Clasps: Additional twelve year periods
- Status: Current
- Established: 1961
- First award: 1961
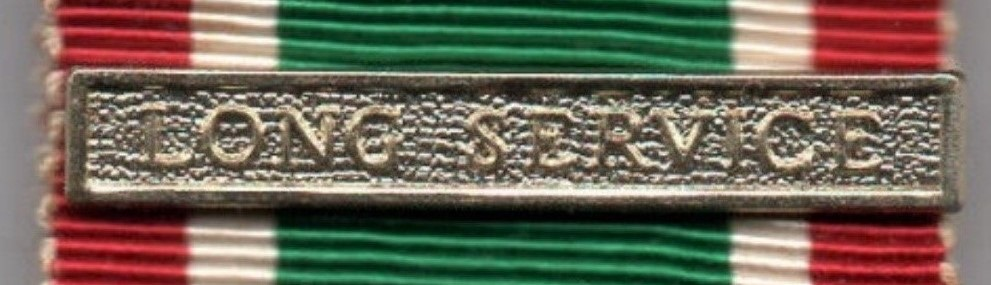
- Second award clasp Ribbon bar

Order of wear
- Next (higher): Voluntary Medical Service Medal
- Next (lower): South African Medal for War Services

The Women's Voluntary Service Medal was instituted in 1961 to reward fifteen years of exemplary service in the Women's Voluntary Service. In 1966 Queen Elizabeth II granted the organisation the prefix "Royal" in recognition of its valued work and the title of the medal was changed to Women's Royal Voluntary Service Medal.

== Royal Voluntary Service ==
The Women’s Voluntary Services for Air Raid Precautions was established in 1938, in anticipation of impending hostilities. They played a key role on the home front during the Second World War, most notably during the Blitz, including in the evacuation of civilians from urban areas. After the war, the organisation evolved to assisting and caring for isolated and lonely people, particularly the elderly. Renamed the Royal Voluntary Service in 2013, it still serves as back-up to professional services in times of crisis by running rest centres and providing emergency feeding to members of the public, fire and rescue crews and police.

== Institution ==
The Women's Voluntary Service Medal was instituted on 23 March 1961. It was renamed the Women's Royal Voluntary Service Medal when Queen Elizabeth II, patron of the Women's Voluntary Service since 1956, granted the organisation the prefix "Royal" in 1966. Although the organisation was further renamed the Royal Voluntary Service in 2013, dropping 'women' from the title, the name of the medal did not change.

== Award criteria ==
The medal can be awarded to a volunteer after completing forty duties each year over a period of fifteen years. Service in the Civil Defence, disbanded in 1968, could count towards the award, provided the period had not been reflected in the award of the Civil Defence Long Service Medal. Holders of the medal qualify for the award of a clasp after each subsequent period of twelve years service.

By 2015, approximately 35,000 medals had been awarded. This includes a number of awards to men, the first in 1964.

== Order of wear ==
In the order of wear prescribed by the British Central Chancery of the Orders of Knighthood, the Women's Royal Voluntary Service Medal takes precedence after the Voluntary Medical Service Medal and before the South African Medal for War Services.

== Description ==
The medal was struck in cupro-nickel by the Royal Mint and is a disk, 36 millimetres (1.42 inches) in diameter, with a raised rim on each side and suspended from a straight non-swivelling bar. The medal's design was created by coin designer Norman Sillman ARCA FRBS. It is awarded unnamed.

Obverse

The obverse has the letters "WVS", superimposed one upon the other in sequence and encircled by a wreath of ivy, the symbol of steadfastness, and rosebuds.

Reverse

The reverse shows three flower stems of rosemary, the woman’s herb, to typify remembrance and friendship. It is circumscribed "SERVICE BEYOND SELF".

Clasp

The clasp was also struck in cupro-nickel and is inscribed "LONG SERVICE". It is rectangular with bend-over pins on the reverse for attachment to the ribbon.

Ribbon

The ribbon is 32 millimetres (1.26 inches) wide, with a 5 millimetres wide red band and a 3 millimetres wide white band, repeated in reverse order and separated by a 16 millimetres wide dark green band.
