= Royal Ulster Constabulary Service Medal =

- Original ribbon, 1982–2000 Second ribbon, 2000–2001
- Type: Service medal
- Awarded for: At least 18 months of service
- Presented by: the United Kingdom
- Eligibility: Members of the Royal Ulster Constabulary and Royal Ulster Constabulary Reserve
- Status: No longer awarded after the RUC was replaced by the Police Service of Northern Ireland
- Established: 20 July 1982
- First award: 23 January 1985

Order of Wear
- Next (higher): Rhodesia Medal
- Next (lower): Northern Ireland Prison Service Medal

The Royal Ulster Constabulary Service Medal was a medal created to honour the service of members of the Royal Ulster Constabulary (RUC) and the RUC Reserve. Established in 1982 and first awarded in 1985, the medal ceased to be awarded when the RUC was replaced by the Police Service of Northern Ireland.

== Criteria ==
This Royal Ulster Constabulary Service Medal was awarded to all members of the RUC and RUC Reserve who completed eighteen months of service. Those individuals who died, were wounded, or disabled due to service, and did not complete the required period of service were also eligible for the medal. Service must have been from 1 January 1971, until the replacement of the RUC in 2001.

== Description ==
The medal is circular and made of silver coloured metal. The obverse bears the effigy of Elizabeth II wearing the St Edward's Crown, surrounded by the royal titles. The reverse depicts the badge of the Royal Ulster Constabulary above the words FOR SERVICE. The ribbon of the medal is light green with central stripes of red, black and dark green. These are representative of the colours of the Royal Ulster Constabulary. In October 2001, the ribbon edges were changed to Garter blue to reflect the award of the George Cross to the Royal Ulster Constabulary.

Approximately 40,000 RUC Service Medals were awarded.

== See also ==
- Police Service of Northern Ireland Service Medal
