= British Red Cross =

British humanitarian organisation

- Founded: 4 August 1870
- Legal status: Incorporated by royal charter, 1908
- Purpose: Humanitarian aid
- Location(s): London, EC2; United Kingdom
- Patron: King Charles III
- Deputy President: Princess Alexandra
- Chief Executive: Béatrice Butsana-Sita
- Main organ: Board of Trustees - chairperson, Liz Padmore
- Revenue: £331 million (2023)
- Staff: 3,548 (2023)
- Volunteers: 10,500 (2023)
- Website: www.redcross.org.uk
- Formerly called: British National Society for Aid to the Sick and Wounded in War

The British Red Cross Society (Welsh: Y Groes Goch Brydeinig) is the United Kingdom body of the worldwide neutral and impartial humanitarian network the International Red Cross and Red Crescent Movement. The society was formed in 1870, and is a registered charity with 10,500 volunteers and 3,500 staff. At the heart of their work is providing help to people in crisis, both in the UK and overseas. The Red Cross is committed to helping people without discrimination, regardless of their ethnic origin, nationality, political beliefs or religion. Queen Elizabeth II was the patron of the society until her death in 2022, and was replaced by her successor King Charles III, who previously served as president between 2003 and 2024.

In the year ending December 2023, the charity's income was £331 million, which included £32M from government contracts and £34M from government grants. Total expenditure was £323M, of which £246M (76%) of its income delivering its charitable activities.

== Guiding ethos ==
The mission of the British Red Cross is to mobilise the power of humanity so that individuals and communities can prepare for, deal with and recover from a crisis, summed up by the strapline 'refusing to ignore people in crisis'. In fulfilling this mission, all volunteers and staff must abide by the seven fundamental principles of the International Red Cross and Red Crescent Movement, which are:

- Humanity
- Impartiality
- Neutrality
- Independence

The British Red Cross also has four values, which guide the way they work. These are:

- Compassion
- Inclusivity
- Dynamism
- Courage

== History ==
=== Formation ===
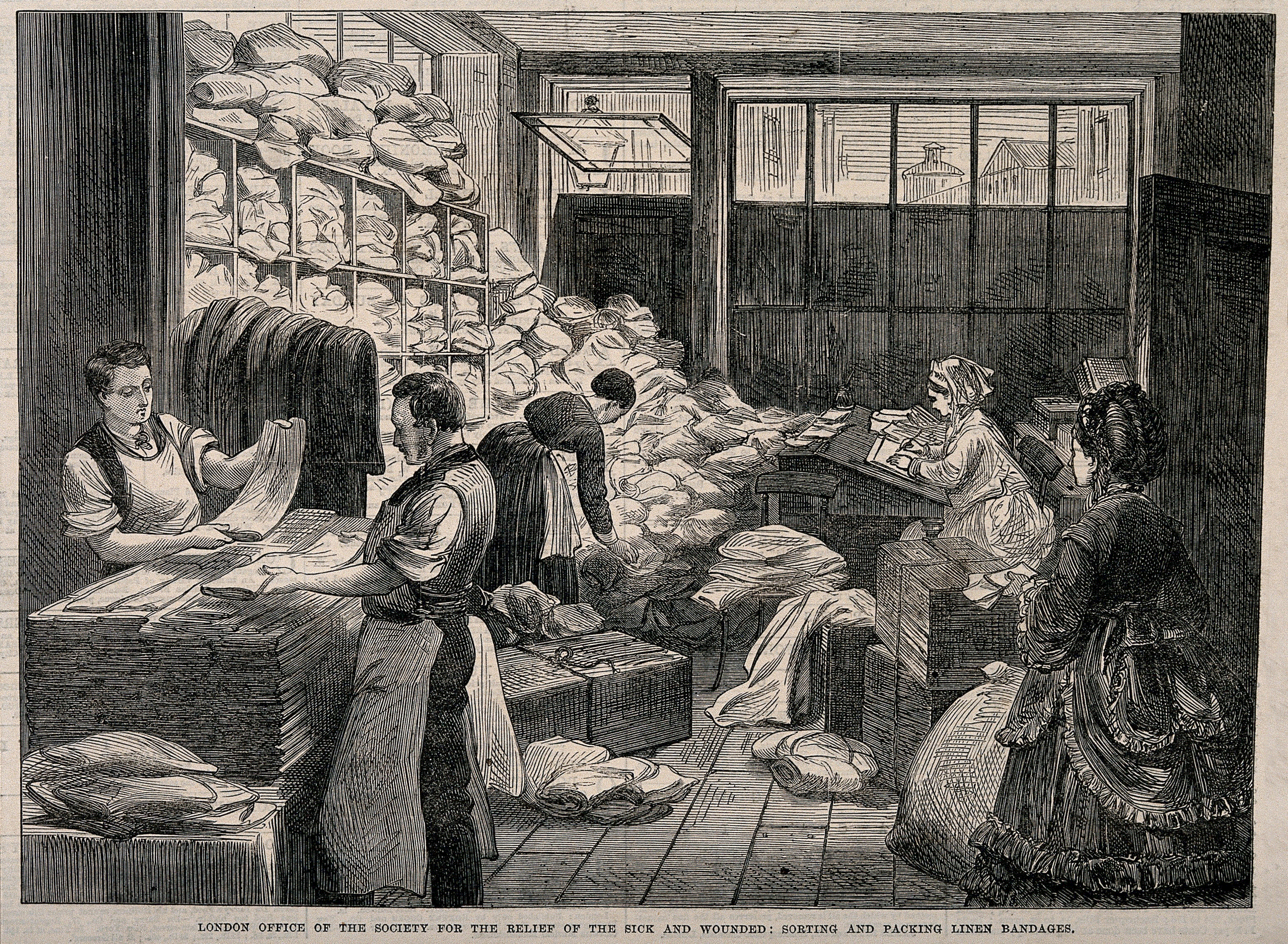
Sorting and packing linen bandages at the London office of the society, September 1870

The British Red Cross was formed in 1870, just seven years after the formation of the international movement in Switzerland. This followed the outbreak of the Franco-Prussian War (1870–1871), and a move across Europe to form similar societies. The society was founded as the British National Society for Aid to the Sick and Wounded in War at a public meeting chaired by Robert Loyd-Lindsay in London on 4 August 1870. It assisted in providing aid to both warring armies in the Franco-Prussian War and subsequent 19th-century conflicts, under the protection of the Red Cross Emblem. The society was one of several British volunteer medical organisations to serve in the war. Queen Victoria was the organisation's first patron.

In 1905, 35 years after its formation, the society was reconstituted as the British Red Cross Society, and was granted its first royal charter in 1908 by King Edward VII, who became the patron. His consort, Queen Alexandra, became its president. In the following years, King George V, King George VI and Queen Elizabeth II assumed the position of patron, while Queen Mary and Queen Elizabeth The Queen Mother served as presidents. King Charles III, who was the society's president between 2003 and 2024, was named patron in May 2024.

=== First World War ===
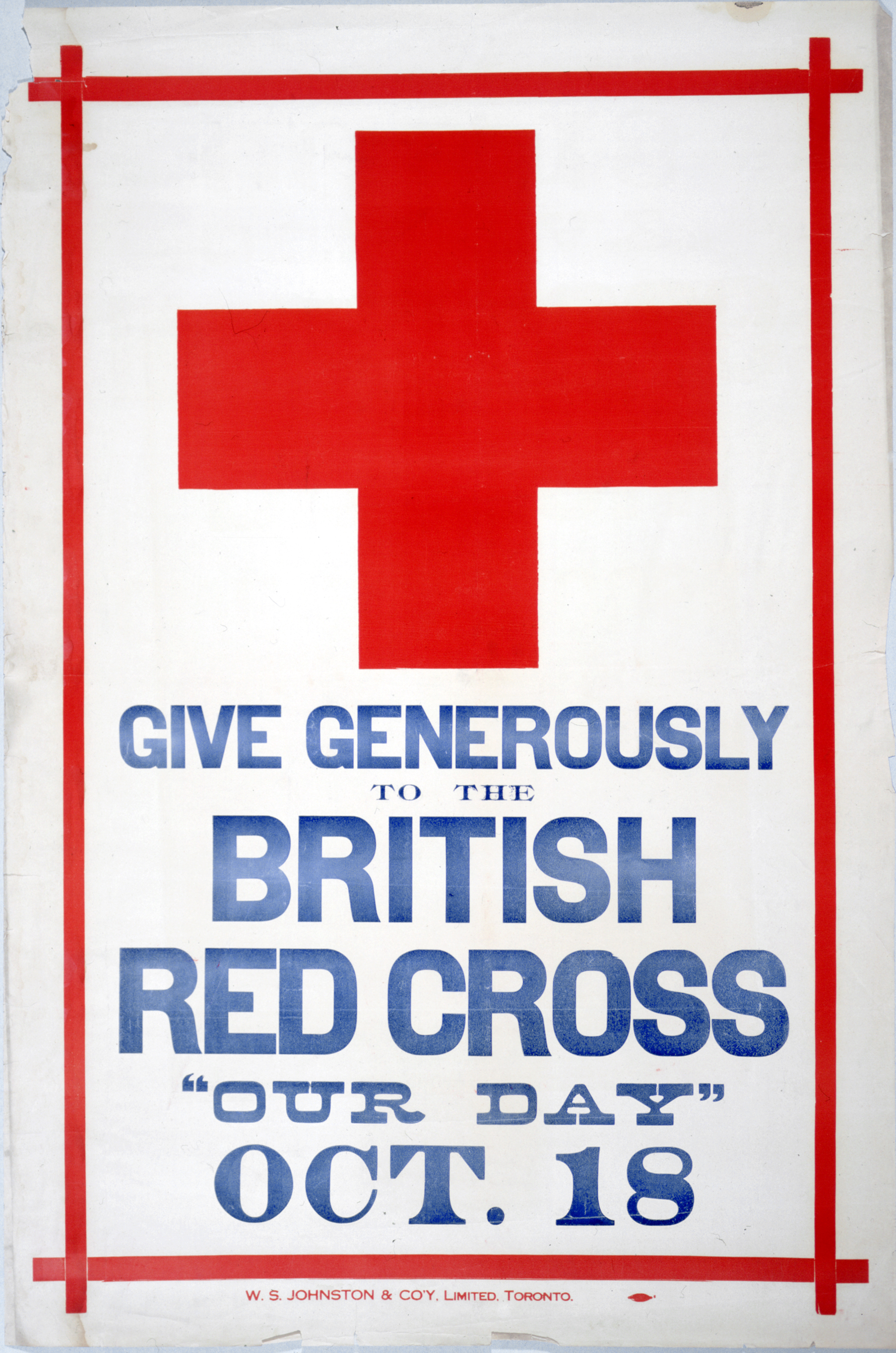
Give generously to the British Red Cross, [between 1914 and 1918], Archives of Ontario poster collection (I0016189)

Following the start of the Great War in 1914, the British Red Cross joined forces with the Order of St John Ambulance to form the Joint War committee and Joint War Organisation. They pooled resources and formed Voluntary Aid Detachments (or VADs) with members trained in First Aid, Nursing, Cookery, Hygiene and Sanitation. These detachments all worked under the protection of the Red Cross, working in hospitals, rest stations, work parties and supply centres.

The Joint War Organisation also aided assistance at the front line, supplying the first motorised ambulances to the battlefields, which were significantly more efficient than the horse-drawn ambulances they replaced. It was active in setting up centres for recording the wounded and missing. Red Cross volunteers searched towns, villages and hospitals where fighting had occurred, noting names of the missing, the injured and the dead. This formed the basis of the international Message and Tracing service, still running today.

Amongst the more innovative activities of the Red Cross in the war was the training of Airedale Terrier dogs to search for wounded soldiers on battlefields.

Christie's auction house in Britain held an auction each year from 1915 to 1918 to benefit the Red Cross. People all across the United Kingdom donated their jewelry to help raise money. In 1918 one of the auctioned pieces was the Red Cross diamond.

=== Inter-war years ===
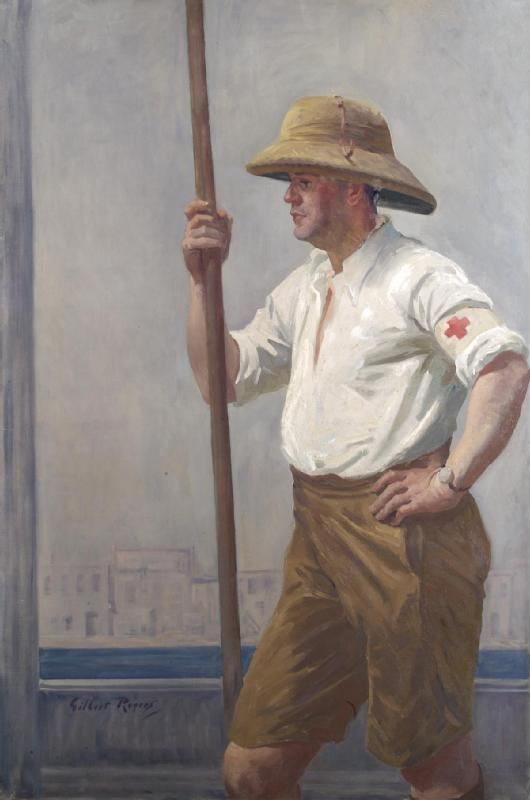
A three-quarter length portrait of a Red Cross and Order of St John barge orderly, wearing sandy coloured shorts, pith helmet and white shirt. He stands side on and holds a wooden barge pole in his right hand. He appears to be standing on the deck of a boat, with the River Tigris and buildings on the riverbank visible behind him, 1919.

In 1919, after the cessation of hostilities, the League of the Red Cross (now the International Federation of Red Cross and Red Crescent societies) was formed, and the role of national societies increased, with a shift of emphasis from wartime relief to focusing on "the improvement of health, the prevention of disease and mitigation of suffering throughout the world". The British Red Cross stayed involved with blood transfusion past the formation of the National Blood Service and it retained an ancillary role until 1987.

The British Red Cross was instrumental in starting overseas societies throughout the British Empire and Commonwealth, most of which are now independent national societies.

In 1924, the British Red Cross started its youth movement, helping to promote its values to a younger generation.

=== Second World War ===
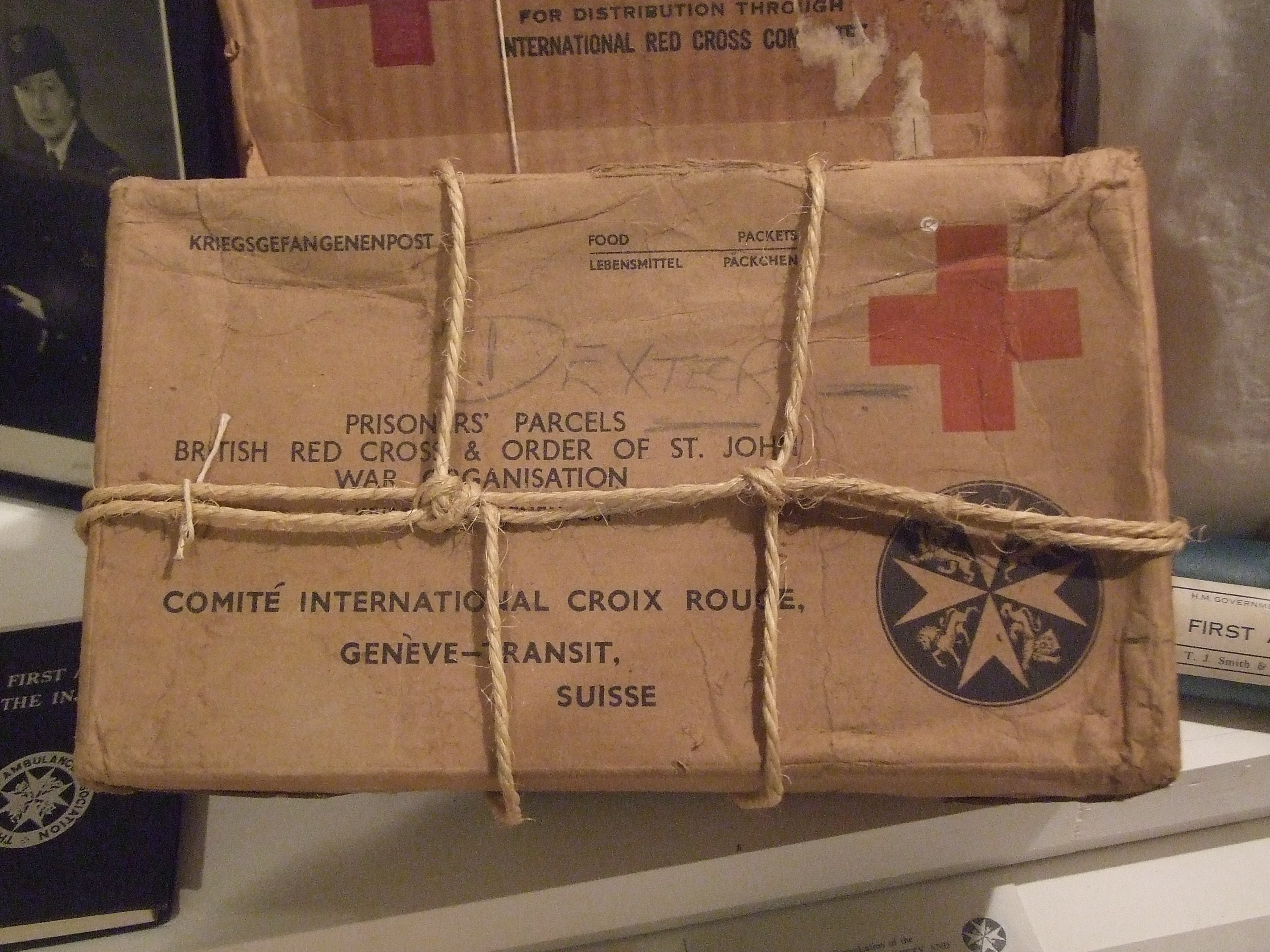
British Red Cross parcel

After the declaration of war in 1939, the British Red Cross once again joined with St John to form the Joint War Organisation, again affording the St John volunteers protection under the Red Cross emblem.

The organisation once again worked in hospitals, care home, nurseries, ambulance units, rest stations and more, much of which was funded by the Duke of Gloucester's Red Cross and St John appeal, which had raised over £54 million by 1946.

The Red Cross also arranged parcels for prisoners of war, following the provisions of the third Geneva convention in 1929, which laid out strict rules for the treatment of PoWs. The Joint War Organisation sent standard food parcels, invalid food parcels, medical supplies, educational books and recreational materials to prisoners of war worldwide. During the conflict, over 20 million standard food parcels were sent.

During the German occupation of the Channel Islands, the islanders were helped to avoid starvation with food parcels brought by the Red Cross ship SS Vega.

=== Post-war years ===
The immediate priorities for the British Red Cross following the war, were the huge number of displaced civilians caused by forced migration during the war. The Red Cross provided much relief for these people, including basic supplies, and helping to reunite people through the Messaging and Tracing Service. This work led to the provisions in the 1949 Fourth Geneva Convention to protect civilians caught up in war.

Since then, the British Red Cross has provided relief to people worldwide, including during the Hungarian Revolution of 1956, in Vietnam in 1976, Famine in Africa in the 1980s and the 1999 Armenia, Colombia earthquake. Whilst the society no longer sends its volunteers abroad, it is a leading contributor of delegates to the International Red Cross pool of emergency relief workers.

Between 1948 and 1967, the British Red Cross and the St Andrew's Ambulance Association jointly operated the Scottish Ambulance Service, under contract to the National Health Service. NHS Scotland took over full responsibility for the service in 1974.

In the UK, the society has been active at many major disasters, from the coal tip slide at Aberfan in 1966, the Pan Am Flight 103 bombing at Lockerbie in 1988, to the 7 July 2005 London bombings. They provide support on all levels, from front line medical provision, to running helplines for worried relatives and long term emotional care for the victims.

In July 2008, the Prince of Wales and the Duchess of Cornwall hosted a garden party at Buckingham Palace to celebrate the 100th anniversary of the granting of the society's royal charter.

== Status and structure ==
The British Red Cross is recognised by the UK Government as one of three Voluntary Aid Societies, the other two being St John Ambulance and St. Andrew's First Aid. It is the sole Red Cross Society for the United Kingdom and the British Overseas Territories.

== Overseas branches ==
Overseas branches are located in:

- British Virgin Islands
- Cayman Islands
- Turks and Caicos Islands
- Montserrat
- Anguilla
- Bermuda
- Falkland Islands
- Gibraltar

Former overseas branches:

- British Hong Kong (before 1997)

== Activities ==
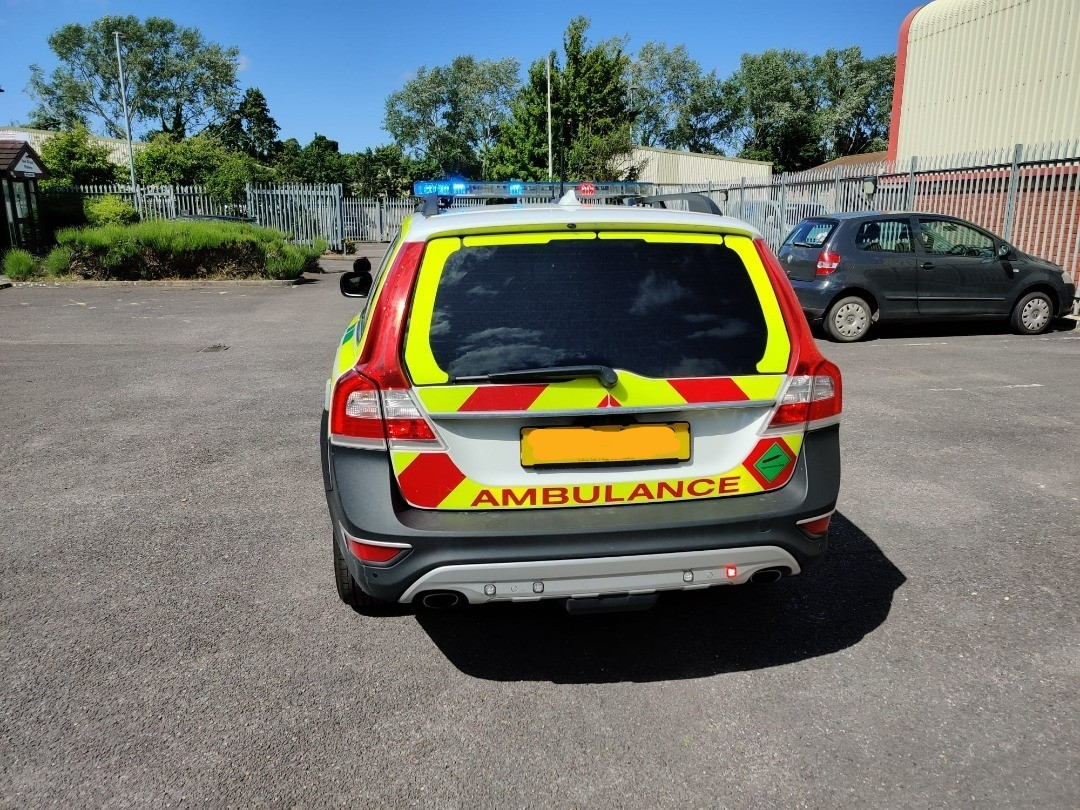
Rapid Response Vehicle (RRV) Ambulance Volvo, used for 999 ambulance work in England

The British Red Cross, as with all IFRC member societies, operate first and foremost an emergency response service, which supports the statutory and governmental emergency services in times of crisis, in accordance with the duty of Red Cross and Red Crescent national societies to be auxiliaries in the humanitarian services of their governments.

The British Red Cross provides a wide range of services to assist the emergency services and statutory authorities, ranging from first aid support and distribution of aid during a crisis to managing a disaster appeal scheme and providing telephone support lines in its aftermath.

Notably, all services of the British Red Cross can be utilised for the emergency response service, as the situation demands. For example, the therapeutic care service can provide support at a rest centre for survivors, while Ambulances can assist the NHS in caring for the injured.

The emergency response service has been present at most types of major emergency such as the London bombings, Manchester Arena bombing, Grenfell Tower fire, rail crashes, other fires, and floods. The British Red Cross operate this service throughout its territory, available 24 hours a day but, contrary to popular belief, does not send its volunteers abroad, as overseas disasters will be dealt with by the society in the country affected.

In addition to this core service, the British Red Cross operates in other areas, both at home and abroad as part of the International Red Cross and Red Crescent Movement to help people in crisis:

=== First aid and ambulance provision ===
==== Event first aid (EFA) ====
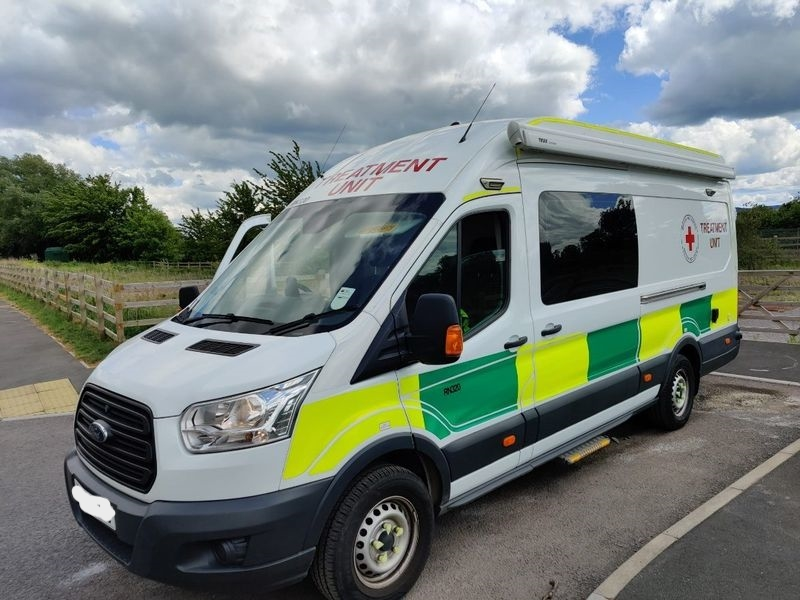
A first aid treatment unit (FATU) Ford Transit, that was used by the Event First Aid Team in England

The International Red Cross and Red Crescent Movement is the largest provider of first aid in the world.

The British Red Cross was possibly most recognised in the UK for its work as a leading provider of first aid at public events across the UK. This stopped in 2020, by the British Red Cross, when it announced in 2019 that it would stop all Event First Aid. Thousands of volunteers gave care to the injured at events of all sizes including Premiership football games, concerts and large-scale running events such as the Great North Run.

The training undertaken by Event First Aid Service volunteers varied, and advanced training was available to those volunteers who wished to undertake it, which included rising to the level of Ambulance Crew, or even undertaking training to become a qualified Ambulance technician. The closure of event first aiders also saw the end of the Voluntary Medical Service Medal being issued to British Red Cross volunteers, much to their dismay, however it is still issued to St Andrew's first aid volunteers.

==== Ambulance Support (AS) ====
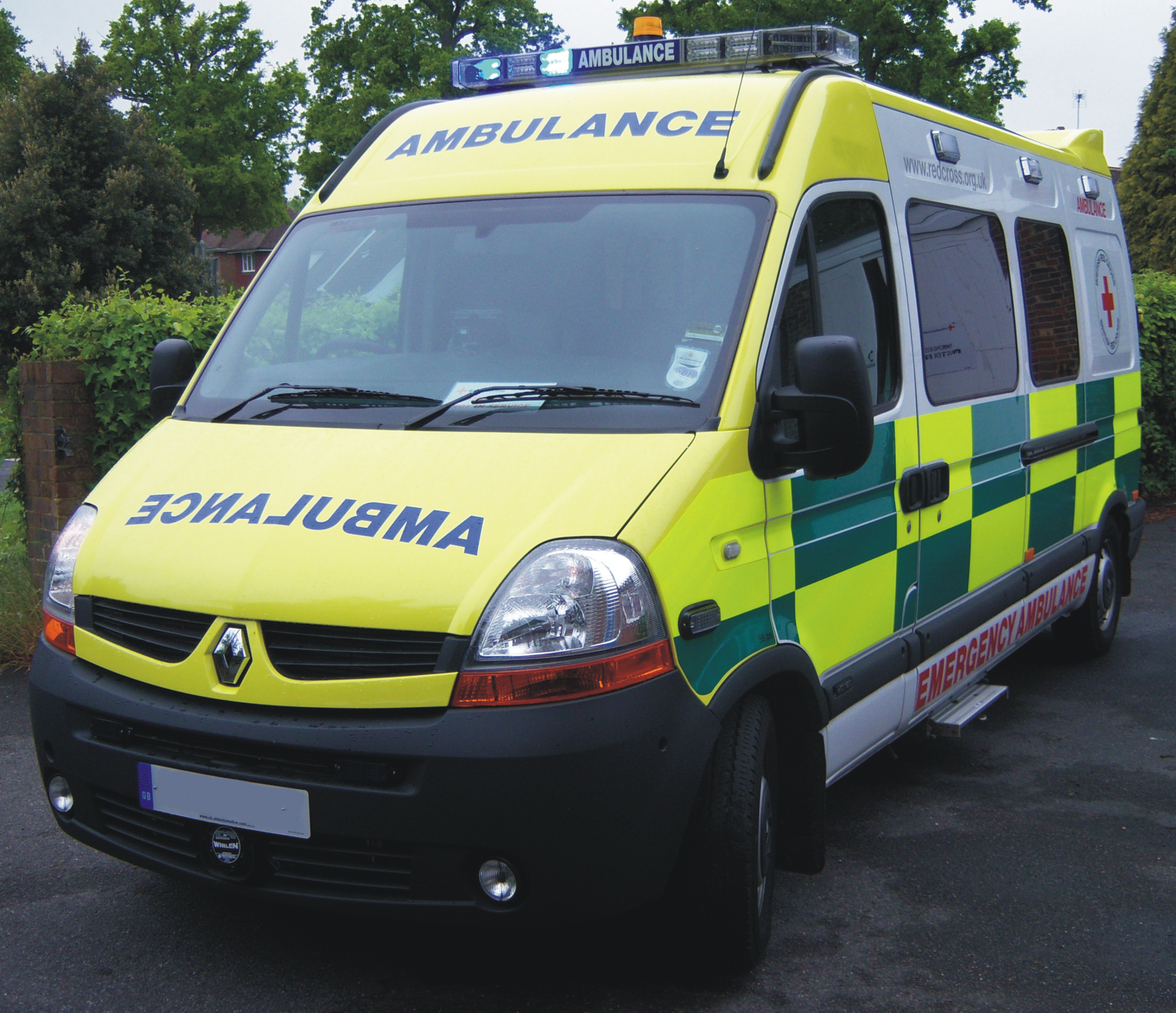
British Red Cross Renault Master emergency ambulance, used by the Ambulance Support team

There are three main areas of Ambulance Support (AS) provided by the BRC:

1. patient transport service (PTS)
2. urgent patient transport
3. blue light emergency response (999).

The BRC also provide ambulance services under royal charter during:

- surges in demand
- predicted periods of high activity
- adverse weather events (e.g. 4x4 ambulances).

Within that there are different clinical levels:

- Ambulance care assistant (ACA) - a non-emergency patient-transport role, moving patients to and from different locations.
- Ambulance crew - provides emergency or urgent transport services
- Ambulance technician (EMT) - qualified EMTs.
- Paramedic - state registered paramedics, employed but the BRC does not train them in-house.

Ambulance crews undergo national standard training and examination and are then qualified to offer an advanced level of care to sick and injured patients.

The training is of a sufficiently high standard, that in many areas, along with the other main medical service provider, St John Ambulance, British Red Cross ambulance crews work on behalf of the NHS ambulance services during particularly busy times or whenever requested, responding to 999 calls from members of the public.

British Red Cross provide ambulance support for the North East Ambulance Service. The BRC also provide PTS in South East Wales, with paid Ambulance Care Assistants being trained and deployed in house.

Specialist units existed within the first aid provision including the Cycle Response Unit, which allowed trained cyclists with enhanced first aid skills to access areas inaccessible to full ambulance vehicles. This was initially sponsored by Land Rover.

==== Fleet Support ====
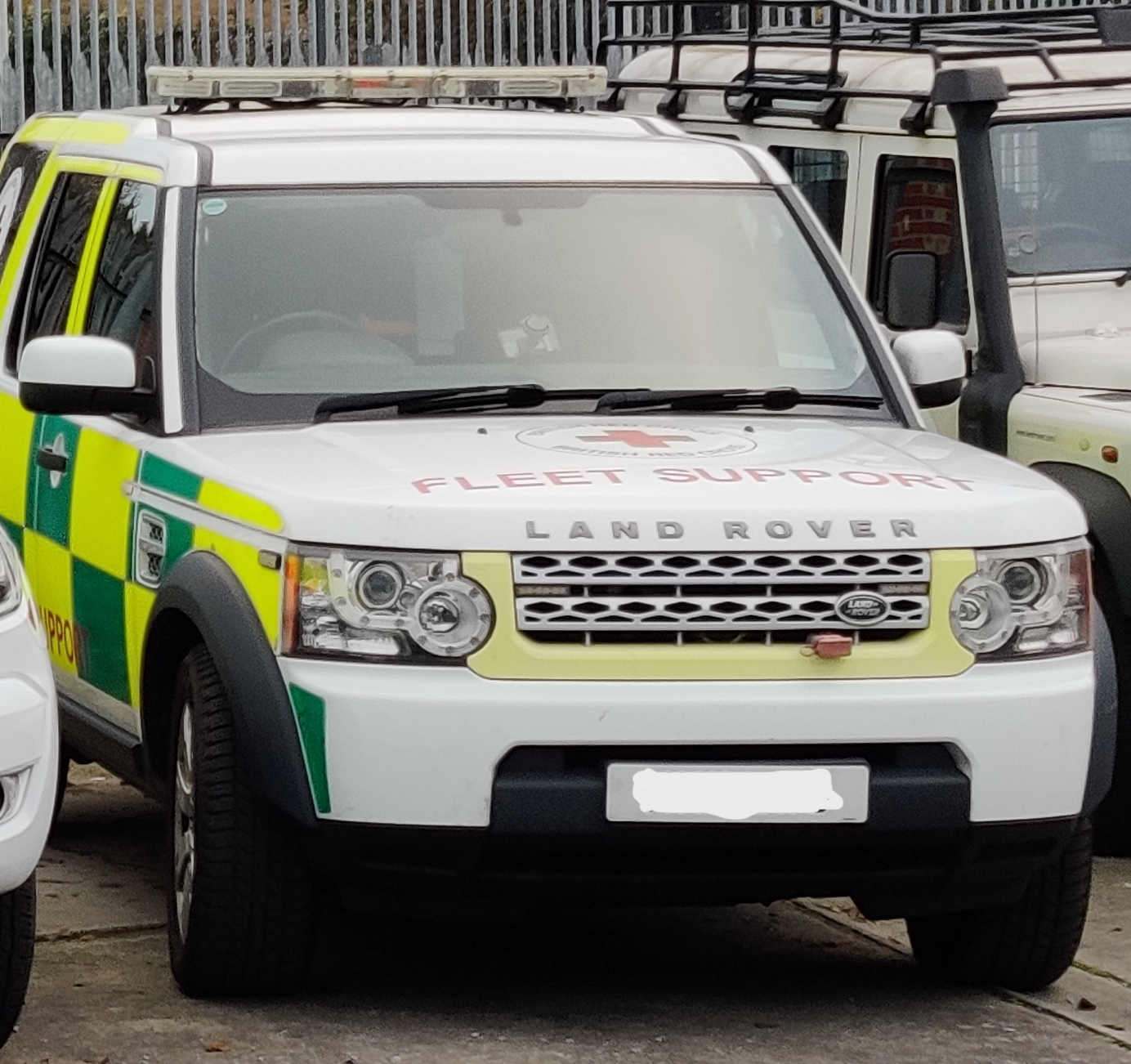
Fleet Support vehicle - Land Rover Discovery, that is used by the BRC Fleet Support Team, supporting BRC ambulances

The BRC's Fleet Support team, is a group of volunteers that look after the fleet of vehicles used by Ambulance Support (AS) and generally includes the following duties:

- Washing and cleaning (outside only) ambulances, rapid response cars, patient transport vehicles (cars & ambulances), emergency response units, vans and 4x4 ambulances
- Driving vehicles between office locations, garages and repairers
- Basic maintenance of vehicles e.g. starting the vehicles, filling windscreen wash, checking wiper fluid, oil checks, checking (visibly) tyre pressure
- Assisting with stock and equipment

==== Closure of Event First Aid ====
In October 2019, the British Red Cross announced to volunteers that it would cease providing Event First Aid services on 31 March 2020. Its Ambulance Support services continue.

=== First aid training ===
The British Red Cross is a provider of first aid training in the United Kingdom. It trains people both on a community and a commercial basis. The commercial training teams run nationally recognised First aid courses specifically designed to provide skills for use at work. The British Red Cross have been running these courses for over 25 years and over 120,000 people are trained each year. Courses range from a basic Emergency Life Support to a three-day First Aid at Work (FAW) course recognised by the Health and Safety Executive.

On a community basis, the British Red Cross is also well known as providing many first aid courses across the country to members of the public, as well as reaching out to schools, community groups and minority groups. One of the projects of the British Red Cross is Everyday First Aid, which seeks to provide training to those who would not otherwise get the opportunity to undertake such training, such as people with disabilities.

First aid training programmes delivered by the Red Cross are renowned for giving participants both the skills and confidence to use what they have learnt, with a combination of theoretical knowledge and practical sessions.

=== Fire and emergency support (FESS) ===
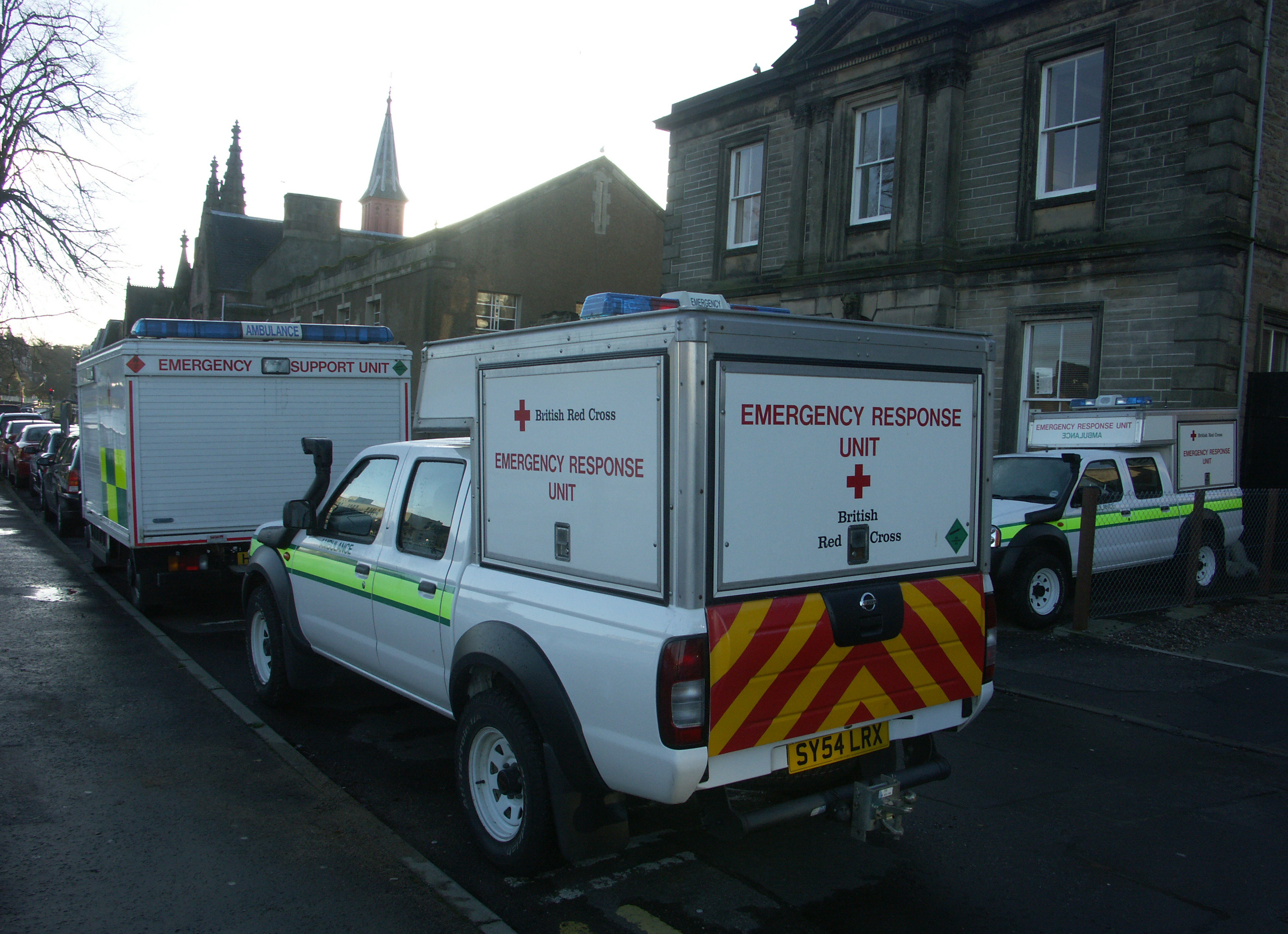
British Red Cross ESU and ERU in Inverness

Formerly known as Fire Victim Support, this service is one of the more recent to be started by the British Red Cross. Covering most, but not yet all, of the UK, the British Red Cross provide assistance at the request of the local fire and rescue service to those in the immediate aftermath of emergencies such as a house fire or road traffic accident.

Typically a team of two volunteers with a customised vehicle will respond to victims and provide them with shelter, food, first aid, clothing, toiletries, washing facilities and moral support. Volunteers will assist with the process of dealing with local authority housing departments or insurance companies to enable rehousing.

In addition, these teams are frequently called out to major incidents to provide support to the firefighters and other emergency services, from simply making refreshments available, to providing a confidential listening service for those members of the emergency services traumatised by what they have just seen.

They also are key in many local authorities' emergency plans and may be given the role of helping at or running survivor reception centres, setting up friends and family reception centres and providing first aid at them, and sometimes the providing first aid at the incident site (such as during the London bombings on 7/7) – thus freeing up more highly trained Paramedics. The Red Cross also are able to set up a number of help lines in connection with major incidents.

=== Medical equipment loan ===
British Red Cross provides the public alongside some NHS hospital trusts to borrow a wheelchair for free. This operates throughout United Kingdom, including Northern Ireland. They nearly have 1,000 different offices that operate this service. This service is operated by the British Red Cross Health and Social Department.

=== Humanitarian education ===
This service provides a way of learning about and understanding the world – best thought of as a form of citizenship education. It is not religious or political, but is centrally concerned with our shared humanity. At the core of humanitarian action and thinking is a desire to contribute to saving lives and reducing suffering. Humanitarian education invites exploration of those actions and thoughts. Humanitarian Education helps students examine what motivates people, including themselves, and extends to other societies, times, and cultures. It explores the wider issues, sometimes surprisingly complex, that arise when people help each other.

The British Red Cross provides educational resources for teachers and trained peer education volunteers. In September 2008 the British Red Cross launched an alternate reality game called Traces of Hope to help educate people about the work the Red Cross does in conflict areas and the effect war has on civilians.

=== Health and social care ===
==== Care in the home ====
The British Red Cross, in some areas, provides short-term care and support for people recently returned from hospital, or recently having suffered an injury that otherwise would result in a hospital or care facility admission. Volunteers enter peoples' homes and help them with the everyday tasks which would otherwise be impossible or pose difficulty for them, such as shopping and getting prescriptions, helping them maintain their independence and dignity, while preparing them for living independently and offering companionship.

There is small Red Cross team working in the discharge lounge in A&E at Leighton Hospital who use their own cars to drive vulnerable patients home and settle them in. The following day they make a follow-up – a phone call. If all is well, great. If not, they can refer on to the BRC's Home from Hospital scheme that provides up to six weeks social support such as help with shopping and befriending. This is one of 26 similar services. There are 86 Home from Hospital services.

While referrals for this service can come from health and social care professionals, people can also self-refer.

==== Therapeutic care ====
British Red Cross volunteers in the Therapeutic Care Service are also active in hospitals and other care settings, such as care homes, where they enter and give patients a therapeutic massage of the head, neck, shoulders and hands through the patient's clothing, to help relax them, particularly at stressful times, and encourage a sense of wellbeing. Referrals for this service usually come from healthcare professionals, but people can self-refer, as the service can also be provided at community meeting places and homes.

==== Crisis intervention community support service ====
The crisis intervention community support service which operates in Derbyshire, Nottinghamshire and Cheshire provides crisis emotional support and assists people in maintaining their independent living skills during a period of crisis. It helps to prevent admission to hospital or respite care by providing short, targeted interventions. The team in Nottingham team consists of 12 healthcare assistants. During 2014, it claimed that 748 admissions were avoided, which would have cost about £1.5 million. The service costs the two local Clinical Commissioning Groups just under £250,000 a year to run.

==== Transport service ====
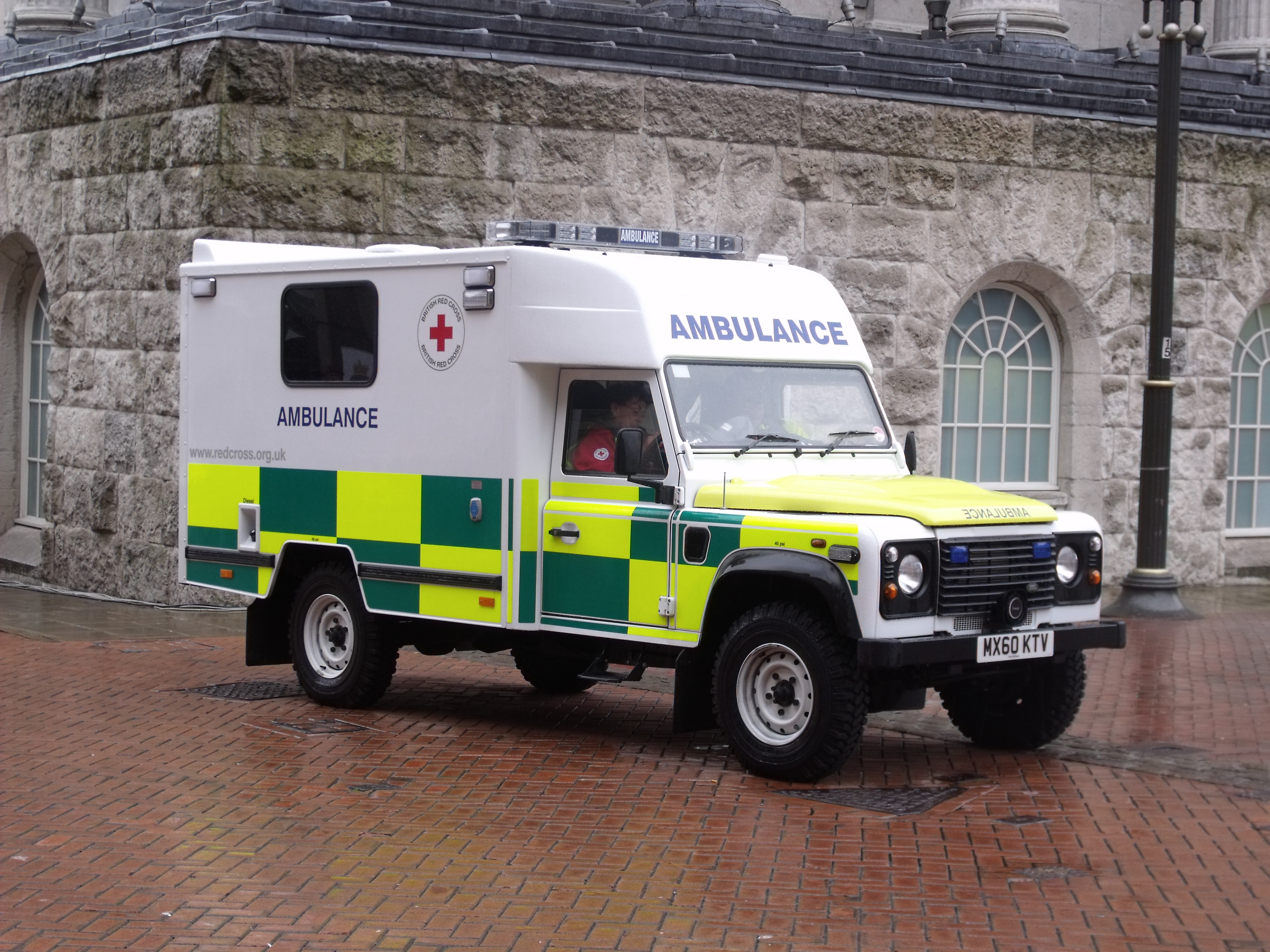
British Red Cross Ambulance - Land Rover Defender. This was used at an event called Armed Forces Day.

The British Red Cross provides a number of transport schemes to get people with limited access to transport, either with their own car or public transport, from place to place. Services can be provided by car or minibus, with an escort if appropriate, in order to help people lead a normal life, such as journeys for medical appointments and to shops. This includes in some areas 'Dial-a-Ride' schemes, where elderly or disabled people can phone and are transported by specially adapted minibus door to door.

In addition, the British Red Cross also provides, in some areas, ambulance transport, either seated or stretcher, between places of treatment, or for admissions and discharges of patients at hospital. This is operated by the trained ambulance crews also used for emergency ambulance provision (see above).

=== Refugee support services ===
Since 1989, the British Red Cross has provided a range of services to refugees, including managing a number of refugee reception centres nationwide. The work includes providing refugee orientation services and ensuring that life essentials, such as shelter and food are provided for. In cases of destitution, the British Red Cross can provide short-term emergency help, and advice on accessing other services. A peer befriending service also exists to provide help to vulnerable refugees, such as young people and women. The British Red Cross can also assist in cases of large-scale arrivals to the United Kingdom.

Since September 2008, the British Red Cross has been a member of the European Council on Refugees and Exiles (ECRE).

=== International family tracing ===
This is another specialised international service, operated by the majority of national Red Cross and Red Crescent societies worldwide. Started to help the refugees of war, this service now extends to any person, who has lost touch with family through war or disaster. The global Red Cross and Red Crescent network uses local volunteers to find relations, put them back in touch, or simply pass messages.

The British Red Cross also provides this service to those separated by the Second World War.

This aspect hit the headlines when a volunteer famous for doing this work for 20 years was dismissed.

=== International disaster relief ===
Since the International Red Cross and Red Crescent Movement is worldwide, there are volunteers in the nation affected that can provide help in disaster situations. However, the British Red Cross, in common with other national societies, sends paid personnel abroad, called delegates, who have specialised skills such as in logistics, to assist the agencies in the aftermath of a major international disaster. This is in addition to resources the British Red Cross can provide, in co-operation with the International Federation of Red Cross and Red Crescent Societies.

The British Red Cross also provides assistance in recovery after the immediate post-disaster situation, helping prepare communities for future emergencies and facilitating long-term development.

Muriel Skeet, a British nurse, was the Nursing Advisor and Chief Nursing Officer (CNO) to the British Red Cross Society from 1970 until 1978. During this time she published her manual for relief work in 1977.

As the largest charity of its type, it is also part of the UK Disasters Emergency Committee, which is a group of large charities who fund raise for major disasters, such as the Boxing day tsunami

=== Health and care abroad ===
The British Red Cross works closely with other Red Cross and Red Crescent Societies to improve the health and care situation of vulnerable communities abroad.

The British Red Cross has been supporting HIV work internationally since the mid-1980s, for example in China, South Africa and Ethiopia. The charity helps combat Tuberculosis in Turkmenistan, Kyrgyzstan and Russia, including supporting programmes involved in raising awareness and supporting those affected in their homes. Furthermore, it supports water and sanitation activities in Zambia, Zimbabwe, Mozambique, Uganda, Ethiopia, Rwanda and Cambodia, by providing safer drinking water and sanitation facilities and educating populations.

The British Red Cross also supports programmes assisting healthcare in conflict areas, such as Iraq and Sudan.

=== HIV awareness ===
The British Red Cross supports the Red Cross and Red Crescent Movement's mission to fight the spread of HIV and AIDS worldwide. The society works with groups of young people to fight discrimination and stigma as well as reducing complacency about catching the disease. On World AIDS Day (1 December) 2007, the society launched an on-line campaign called "HIV: What's the story?" to target young people in the UK and overseas. The campaign also makes extensive use of social networking sites such as Facebook and Bebo.

=== Youth Engagement ===
British Red Cross won the Queen Elizabeth II Platinum Jubilee Award for Volunteering for their work to empower young people.

=== Example of annual activity ===
In 2010 the British Red Cross carried out the following activities:

- provided water, food and shelter for over 420,000 people affected by 25 overseas disasters
- trained 221,970 people in first aid (in the UK)
- provided first aid services at 9,533 public events
- responded to 2,102 emergencies in the UK
- helped 7,109 victims of fire

== Fundraising ==
British Red Cross charity shops
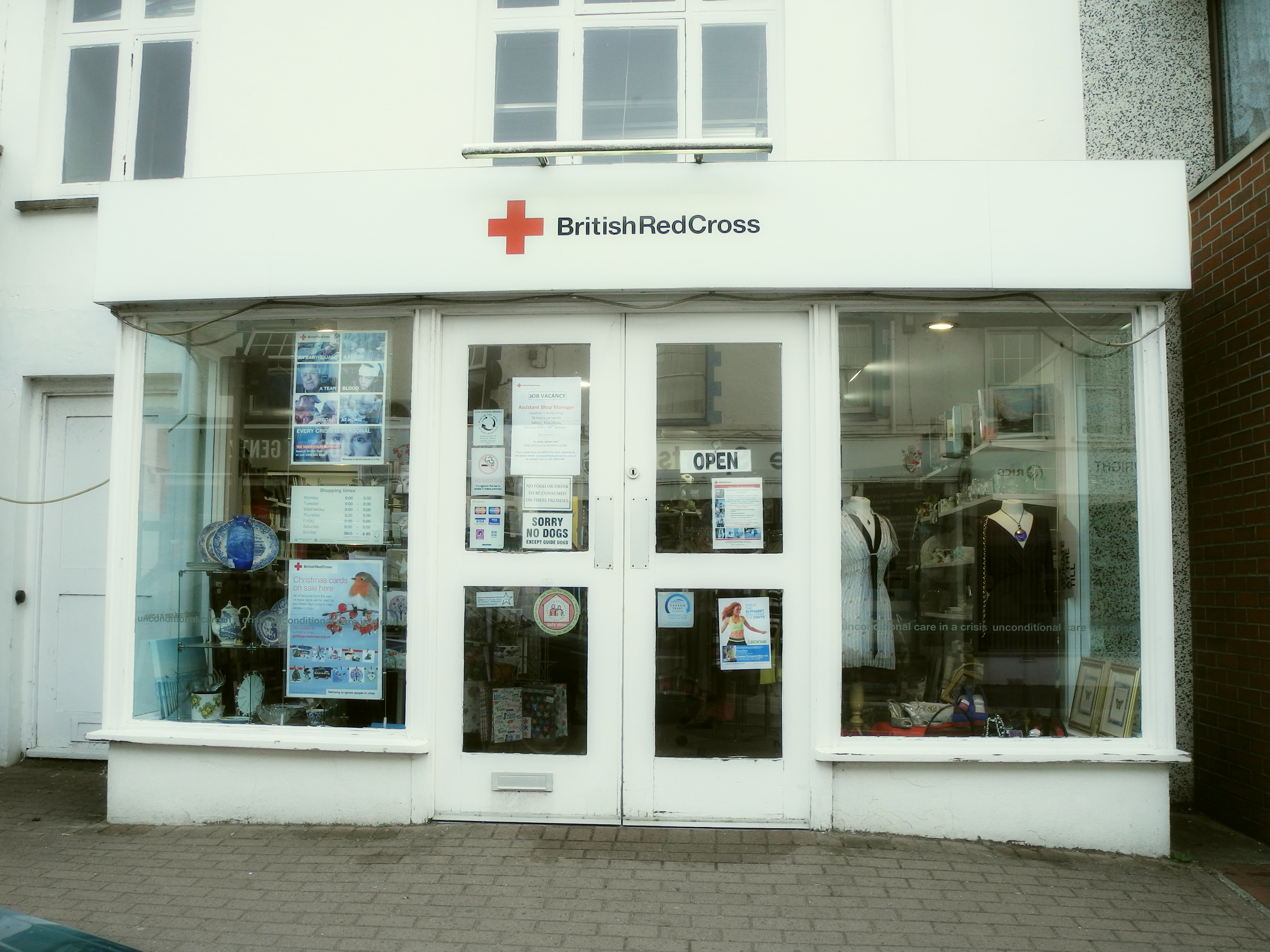
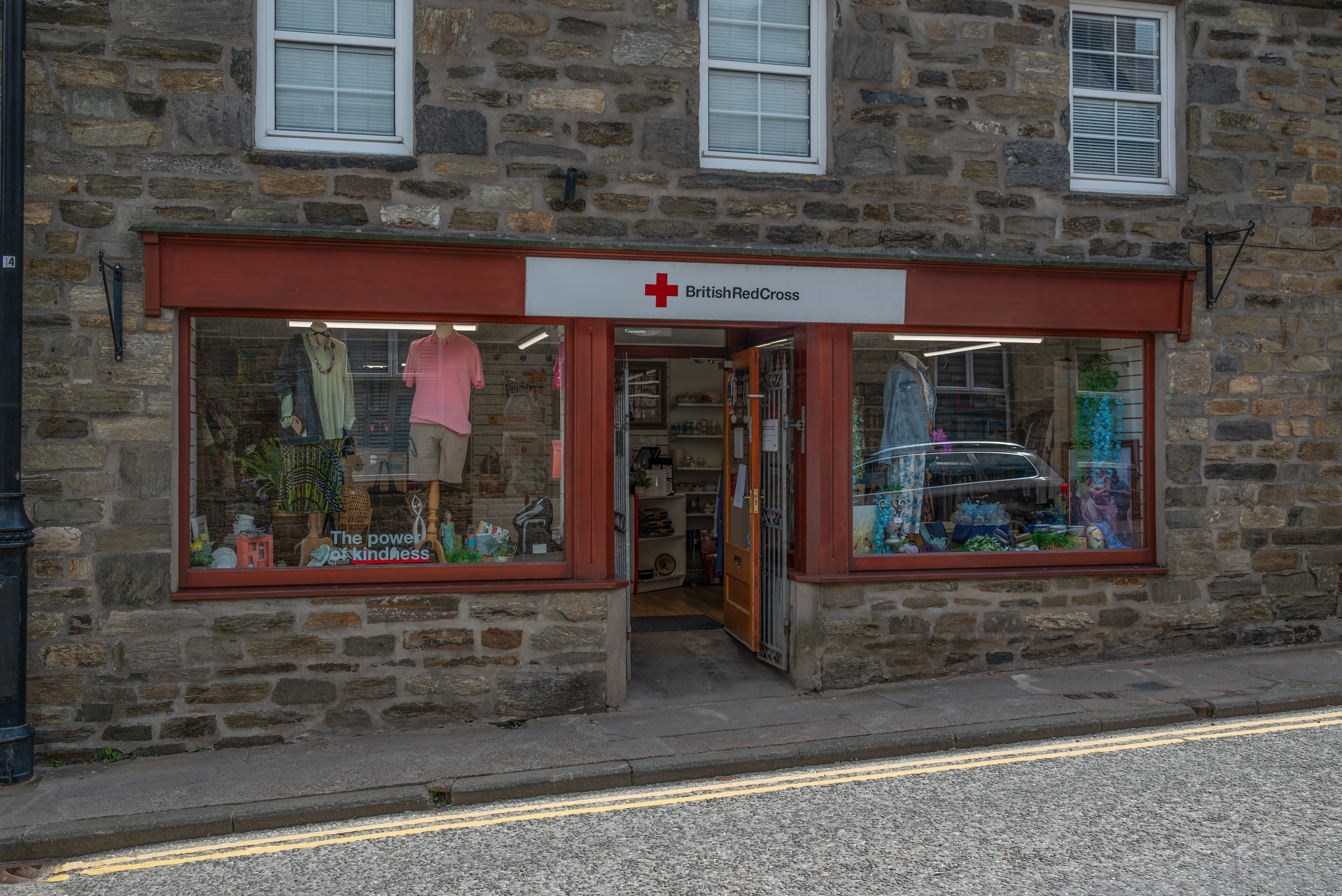

As a charity, the British Red Cross relies heavily on voluntary contributions from members of the public and organisations, in order to carry out its work. In addition, it does also make money from its commercial services, including First Aid Training (for the workplace), First aid provision at events and providing auxiliary crews to the ambulance services.

Whilst personal donations are important, the scale of corporate donations can make a huge difference to the society, and initiatives such as being the Tesco charity of the year in 2007 make large contributions to central funds.

Every year, many events are held, including sponsored bike rides, walks and even skydives. Red Cross Appeal Week (formerly known as Red Cross Flag Week), is held annually in May, to coincide with the birthday of Red Cross founder, Henry Dunant. This is a week where staff and volunteers are asked to donate two hours to run street and private premises collections.

The British Red Cross helps to fund, and is aided with funds raised by, the national will-making scheme Will Aid, in which participating solicitors waive their usual fee to write a basic will and in exchange invite the client to donate to charity.

=== Celebrity links ===
To help boost support for the cause, the Red Cross has a number of celebrity ambassadors which include Angela Rippon, Michael Buerk, James McAvoy, David Bull, Josie d'Arby, Nancy Dell'Olio, Konnie Huq, Craig Gannon and Dougray Scott.

== British Red Cross Museum ==
The British Red Cross runs a museum containing a variety of materials from its beginnings in 1870 to the present day. This museum is a member of The London Museums of Health & Medicine group. The collections include posters, photographs, badges worn by Society members, medals awarded to Society members, medical equipment and fundraising materials.

The museum is free to enter and can be visited without booking. Guided tours of the museum and research visits to the archives must be booked in advance.

== Controversies ==
=== The Red Cross and letters to game developers ===
The British Red Cross sent a warning letter to the developers of the indie game Prison Architect in 2016. The organisation claims that, by using red cross images on Prison Architect ambulances and paramedics, the game has violated the Geneva Conventions.

The Red Cross symbol (along with the Red Crescent and the Red Crystal) is protected under the Geneva Convention, this is to distinguish armed combatants from impartial humanitarian aid workers. The warning letter was sent due to the possibility of the red cross being mistaken as a sign of first aid, and not as protected humanitarian work. The Red Cross fear that the mistaken use may cause the symbol's meaning to be misinterpreted during war.

The Prison Architect developers changed the cross to green, a colour commonly on medical signs and equipment (as shown by various ISO Standards) so its use is more commonly associated with medical help.

== Honours ==
- The Voluntary Medical Service Medal may be earned by volunteers with the British Red Cross after 15 years service with a Clasp for each additional period of five years service. This medal is also awarded by St. Andrew's First Aid in Scotland.
- British Red Cross Badge of Honour: an award issued by the organization.

== See also ==
- List of Red Cross and Red Crescent Societies
