= Muriel Skeet =

British nurse

- Born: 12 July 1926; Colchester
- Died: 22 November 2006 (aged 80)
- Alma mater: Middlesex Hospital; London School of Hygiene and Tropical Medicine
- Occupation: Nurse
- Employer: British Red Cross (1970–1978); Florence Nightingale Foundation (1965–1970); Middlesex Hospital (1949–1960); Nuffield Trust (1961–1964); World Health Organization (1970–1996)
- Awards: Fellow of the Royal College of Nursing (1977)

Muriel Hilda Skeet FRCN (12 July 1926 – 22 November 2006) was a British nurse, known for her international work and publications.

== Early life ==
Muriel Hilda Skeet was born in Colchester on 12 July 1926. Following a private education in Colchester, she then joined Endsleigh House School.

== Nursing career ==
Skeet trained as a nurse at London's Middlesex Hospital in March 1945, where she qualified and registered with the General Nursing Council in 1948. She worked there as a staff nurse, ward sister and administrative sister until 1960.

Skeet then spent a year in the South of France and Rome carrying out private nursing including for the Agnelli family.

On her return to England, Skeet became a fieldwork organiser with the Nuffield Provincial Hospitals Trust, now Nuffield Trust. During this time, she undertook a one-year course in medical statistics and epidemiology at the London School of Hygiene and Tropical Medicine.

In 1965, Skeet went into a research post at the Florence Nightingale Memorial Committee of Great Britain and Northern Ireland, now known as the Florence Nightingale Foundation, until 1970. Works that she wrote at this time changed nursing practices: the popularity of her book Waiting in Outpatients caused appointment systems to be introduced, and Marriage and Nursing saw crèches introduced for nursing staff with young children. Home from Hospital was particularly influential in changing how patients were informed ready for discharge and in causing hospitals to investigate the circumstances that patients were being discharged to at home.

Skeet was the Nursing Advisor and Chief Nursing Officer (CNO) to the British Red Cross Society from 1970 until 1978. She conducted work in disaster areas for 25 years and her manual for relief work (1975) is still widely used.

After this, Skeet worked for the World Health Organization until she was 60, and then as a consultant until 1996.

== Personal life and death ==
When Skeet was 18, her fiancé was killed in the World War II.

Skeet died at a nursing home in Exmouth, Devon, on 22 November 2006, at the age of 80.

== Honours ==
Skeet was made a Fellow of the Royal College of Nursing in 1977.

== Bibliography ==
- with Blackman, F. Dame Nita: Caribbean woman, world citizen. (Kingston, Ian Randle Publishers 1995)
- The age of aging: implications for nursing. (London, International Council of Nurses/World Health Organization 1989)
- Emergency procedures and first aid for nurses. 2nd edition. (Oxford, Blackwell-Scientific 1988)
- Nursing science in nursing practice. (Copenhagen, World Health Organization 1983)
- Home from hospital: providing continuing care for elderly people. Some key issues and learning from the field. (London, King's Fund Centre 1982)
- with Smith, J.P., Hockey, L., Cox, C. Nursing science in nursing practice. (London, Butterworths 1981)
- Emergency procedures and first aid for nurses. (Oxford, Blackwell 1981)
- Notes on nursing: the science and the art. (Edinburgh, Churchill Livingstone 1980)
- Manual for disaster relief work. (Edinburgh, Churchill Livingstone 1977)
- Discharge procedures: practical guidelines for nurses. (London, Nursing Times 1975)
- with Stroud, J. Home nursing. (London, Stanley Paul 1975)
- "Home from hospital": the results of a survey conducted among recently discharged hospital patients. (London, Dan Mason Nursing Research Committee 1971)
- with Ramsden, G.A. Marriage and nursing: a survey of State Registered and State Enrolled Nurses: the fifth report. (London, Dan Mason Nursing Research Committee 1967)
- 'Issues in accountability.' Recent Advances in Nursing. 19. pp. 1–20 (1988)
- 'Internationalisation of nursing.' Recent Advances in Nursing. 18. pp. 109–128 (1987)
- 'Romantics or realists? WHO initiatives - could be under threat.' Nursing Times. 83(23) p. 20 (1987)
- 'Some international concepts of old age.' Nursing. 2(41) pp. 1206–1208 (1985)
- 'Community health workers: promoters of inhibitors of primary health care?.' International Nursing Review. 32(2) pp. 55–58 (1985)
- with Thompson, R. 'Creative nursing: processive care and more nurses' excellent personal qualities were not being used in their professional practice.' Journal of Advanced Nursing. 10(1) pp. 15–4 (1985)
- 'The influence of world trends upon health.' Curationis. 6(4) pp. 11–15 (1983)
- 'When elderly people go into hospital: planning long-term nursing care.' Nursing Focus. 4(7) pp. 15–16 (1983)
- 'A healthier life for all...the role of nursing.' Nursing Mirror. 155(22) pp. 35–37 (1982)
- 'Adding life to years: role of nursing.' Nursing Journal of India. 73. pp. 95–96 (1982)
- 'Enhancing old age: the role of nursing.' New Zealand Nursing Journal. 75(8) pp. 8–9 (1982)
- 'Enhancing old age: the role of nursing.' Nursing Focus. 3. pp. 4–5 (1982)
- 'How the other half dies...controversy surrounding the promotion and sale of powdered baby milk in the Third World.' Nursing Times. 78(38) pp. 1586–1588 (1982)
- 'Primary health care - a case for teamwork.' Nursing Focus. 4(2) pp. 6–14 (1982)
