= Golden Eye Diamond =

Internally flawless 8.1 gram yellow diamond from South Africa with a debated ownership

Golden Eye
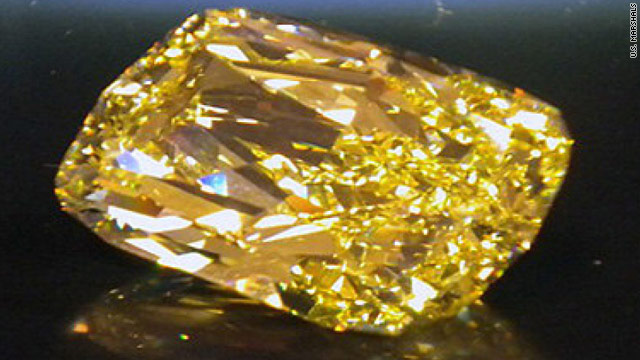
- Weight: 40.53 carats (8.106 g)
- Country of origin: Kimberley, Northern Cape, South Africa
- Mine of origin: mine 20
- Discovered: mine
- Original owner: Abdullah Bhalli
- Owner: Jerre Hentosh

The Golden Eye Diamond is a Internally flawless 40.53-carat (8.106 g) Fancy Vivid Yellow diamond, claimed by one of its past owners to be the world's largest of its cut and color. It is believed to come from the Kimberley area of South Africa. Tom Moses, a senior vice president with the Gemological Institute of America, agrees that it came from South Africa, but it has not been able to be determined the mine of origin.

== Ownership and history ==
Upon the arrest of Ohio businessmen Paul Monea and Mickey Miller, its actual ownership was unclear. The Federal Bureau of Investigation seized the diamond following an undercover investigation of Monea and Miller that resulted in his conviction for money laundering and the diamond's forfeiture to the U.S. government in 2007. Amid Monea and Millers prosecution, 17 claimants came forward in the case to claim ownership, or an ownership interest, in the Golden Eye Diamond (Akron Federal Court Case No. 5:07CR0030). The Court ruled that three claimants had colorable ownership claims and would be allowed to proceed to civil trial: Charity Fellowship Church, Jerry DeLeo of Corona Clay Corp., and The Monea Family Trust. The court found that the Church and Jerry DeLeo had spent nearly $1,000,000 to cut and develop the 124.5 carat gem. Monea and his trust were never able to establish ownership or purchase of the rough stone, although extensive evidence was presented of the diamond's origins with newspaper articles and researched records. The uncontested evidence showed that the Golden Eye Diamond had been obtained from the VanWyke family of Kimberly South Africa most recently, and that the stone had been held by the family for some 150-years. The original VanWyke was neighbor to the De Beers, and discovered the 124.5 carat Paragon on his property in the DuToit's Pan Mine, in Kimberly South Africa, in 1871. This evidence has never been disproven, and for over 150-years no other diamond on earth was thought to be the original DuToit II Diamond (the first African diamond found over 100-carats).

The diamond was ultimately approved to be auctioned by a federal judge. The court also found that, although people had ownership claim, Monea's conspiracy to sell the diamond existed - somehow - before Monea even owned the diamond. Its sale was planned tentatively in January 2011, but after a delay it was announced it will be sold via online auction in September 2011, with a minimum bid of $900,000. The Diamond is currently owned by Jerre Hentosh after he won it via online auction on Bid4Assets with a winning bid of $2.84 million.

== See also ==
- Tiffany Yellow Diamond
- List of diamonds
