= Nassak Diamond =

43.38 carats (8.676 g) diamond originated from India

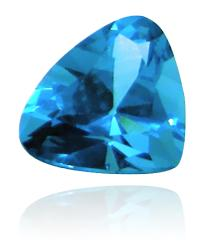
- Munich, Germany's Reich der Kristalle museum replica of the 1820s Rundell and Bridge recut of the Nassak Diamond. In reality the diamond was nowhere near this blue, being a white Type IIa classic Golconda diamond. The term "blue-white" is often used to describe these diamonds but in reality alongside a modern D-color diamond it would have had an extremely faint blue cast. Its cut was also more complex (see below images).
- Weight: 43.38 carats (8.676 g)
- Dimensions: 23.35 x 21.73 x 11.51 mm (estimate)
- Color: Blue-white
- Cut: Emerald
- Country of origin: India
- Mine of origin: Kollur Mine Golconda Diamonds
- Discovered: 15th century
- Cut by: Harry Winston
- Original owner: Trimbakeshwar Shiva Temple
- Owner: Edward J. Hand
- Estimated value: $4.05 million (inflation adjusted 1970 value)

The Nassak Diamond (also known as the Nassac Diamond and the Eye of the Idol) is a large, 43.38 carats (8.676 g) Golconda Diamond that originated as a larger 89-carat diamond in the 15th century in India. Found in the Golconda mine of Kollur and originally cut in India, the diamond was the adornment in the Trimbakeshwar Shiva Temple, near Nashik, in the state of Maharashtra, India from at least 1500 to 1817. The British East India Company captured the diamond through the Third Anglo-Maratha War and sold it to British jewellers Rundell and Bridge in 1818. Rundell and Bridge recut the diamond in 1818, after which it made its way into the handle of the 1st Marquess of Westminster's dress sword.

The Nassak Diamond was imported into the United States in 1927, and was considered one of the 24 great diamonds of the world by 1930. American jeweller Harry Winston acquired the Nassak Diamond in 1940 in Paris, France and recut it to its present flawless 43.38 carats (8.676 g) emerald-cut shape. Winston sold the diamond to a New York jewellery firm in 1942. Mrs. William B. Leeds of New York received the gem in 1944 as a sixth anniversary present and wore it in a ring. The Nassak Diamond was last sold at an auction in New York in 1970 to Edward J. Hand, a trucking firm executive from Greenwich, Connecticut. Currently the diamond is held at a private museum in Lebanon, though there have been some calls for its return and restoration to the Indian temple.

== History ==
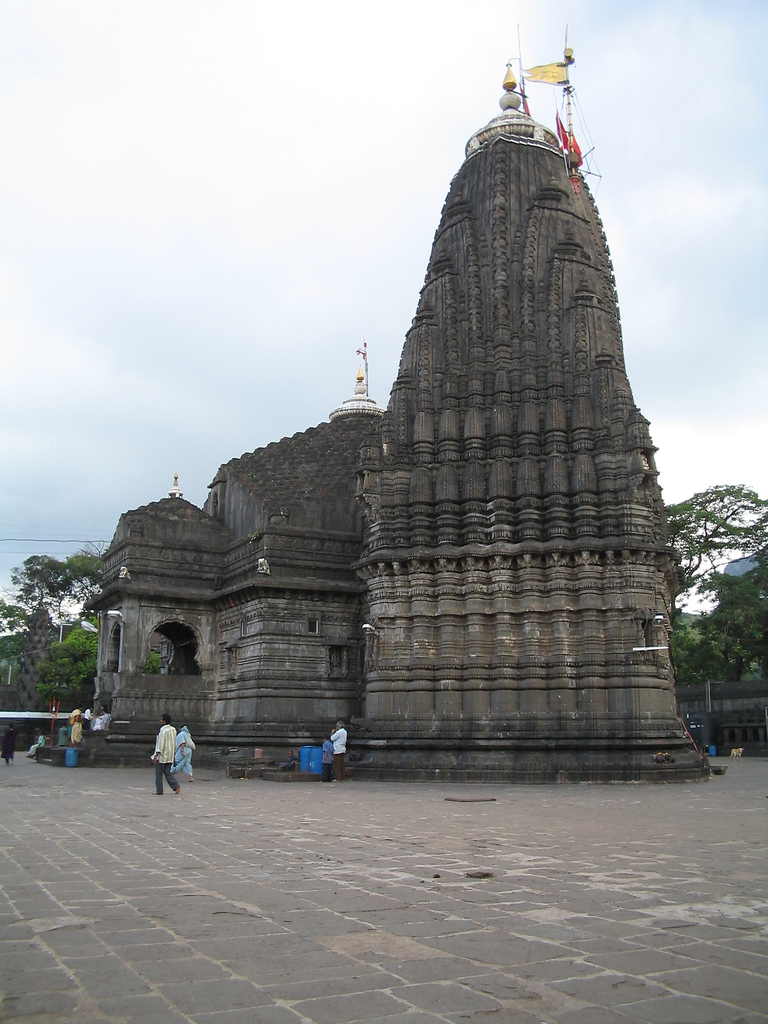
Trimbakeshwar Shiva Temple in Nashik, India

The Nassak Diamond originated in the 15th century in India. Although the date of the original cutting is unknown, the original cutting was performed in India and had sacrificed everything to size while giving the diamond a form and appearance similar to that of the Koh-i-Noor diamond. According to local legend, this diamond was donated to the Trimbakeshwar Shiva Temple of Nashik by an aristocratic Maratha family. It was believed as a divine eye of Lord Shiva and was adorned in Shivalinga around 15th C.E. From 1680 C.E. During Mughal-Maratha Wars the temple was attacked several times but Marathas saved Shivalinga time to time. Later it became one of important temples in Maratha Empire As priests worshiped Shiva, the diamond eventually acquired its name from its long-term proximity to Nashik.

In 1817, the British East India Company and the Maratha Empire in India began the Third Anglo-Maratha War. During the Maratha war, the Nassak Diamond disappeared from the Shiva temple. The war ended in 1818 and the British East India Company was left decisively in control of most of India.

As per the claims made by British The Baji Rao II the last independent Indian Peshwa Prince, who handed over the diamond to an English colonel named J. Briggs. In turn, Briggs delivered the diamond to Francis Rawdon-Hastings, the 1st Marquess of Hastings who had conducted the military operations against the Peshwa. Rawdon-Hastings delivered the diamond to the East India Company as part of the spoils of the Maratha war. The East India Company then sent the Nassak Diamond to England, to be sold on the London diamond market in 1818.

Vectorized drawings of an 1876 sketch of the Nassak Diamond.

At the London diamond market, the Nassak Diamond was presented as an approximately 89 carats (17.8 g) diamond of great purity "but of bad form," having a somewhat pear-shape. The diamond further was characterised as a "rudely faceted, lustreless mass." Illustrations in Herbert Tillander's book "Diamond Cuts in Historic Jewelry – 1381 to 1910" show it as being a semi-triangular moghal cut with a plateau top, similar looking to the 115-carat Taj-E-Mah Diamond which resides in the Iranian Crown Jewels. Despite its appearance, the diamond was sold for about 3,000 pounds (equivalent today to £277,000) to Rundell and Bridge, a British jewellery firm based in London.

Rundell and Bridge held onto the diamond for the next 13 years. During that time, the jewellery firm instructed its diamond cutter "to keep as closely as possible to the traces of the Hindu cutter, 'amending his defects, and accommodating the pattern to the exigencies of the subject matter.'" The recut by Rundell and Bridge from 89.75 carats (17,950 mg) to 78.625 carats (15,725.0 mg) resulted of a loss of no more than 10 percent of the original weight of the diamond.

In 1831, Rundell and Bridge sold the diamond to the Emanuel Brothers for about 7,200 pounds (today about £826,000). Six years later in 1837, the Emanuel Brothers sold the Nassak Diamond at a public sale to Robert Grosvenor, the 1st Marquess of Westminster. At one point, the Marquess mounted the diamond in the handle of his dress sword. In 1886, the diamond was valued at between 30,000 and 40,000 pounds (today between £4,128,000 and £5,504,000), due in part to its vast gain in brilliancy from the re-cut by Rundell and Bridge.

== Mauboussin and the lawsuit ==
Side view 13a, top view 13b, and bottom view 13c drawings of the Nassak Diamond as it appeared between the Rundell and Bridge recut and the 1940 Winston recut. A US court ruled in 1930 that the shown recut revealed nothing more than "a large diamond, cut in an ordinary way." These drawings are from Max Bauer's 1904 book "Precious Stones".

In 1922, George Mauboussin had become the named partner of "Mauboussin, Successeur de Noury," a French jewellery house that traced its roots to its founding by M. Rocher in 1827. In March 1927, the Duke of Westminster used US importers Mayers, Osterwald & Muhlfeld to sell the diamond to Parisian jeweller George Mauboussin, who was living in the United States at the time. Mauboussin's importation of the diamond into the United States was tax free, since the diamond was determined to be an artistic antiquity produced more than one hundred years prior to the date of importation. However, E. F. Bendler, an American wholesaler and dealer in diamonds and a rival of Mauboussin, filed a protest that resulted in a lawsuit to determine whether a tax should be imposed on the diamond's entry into the United States. By November 1927, Mauboussin considered selling the diamond to friends of General Primo de Rivera, who planned to give the diamond to the dictator on the occasion of his forthcoming investiture as marshal of Spain. That sale never materialised and the lawsuit continued. The diamond was nearly lost in a theft that occurred in January 1929, when four gunmen robbed the Park Avenue jewellery store where the Nassak Diamond was being kept. However, the thieves missed finding the diamond because it was being stored in a soiled envelope.

After the first robbery attempt, Mauboussin's jewellery firm opened a branch in New York City on 1 October 1929, only to be met by the Wall Street crash of 1929 at the end of October. To compound matters, the same gang of international robbers tried to steal the Nassak Diamond again in May 1930, but once again missed it.

Prior to the outcome of the lawsuit, the insured diamond was valued between US$400,000 and $500,000 (allowing for inflation, this would now be $7.53 million and $9.41 million). At the time the lawsuit was pending, imported diamonds that were cut and suitable for use in the manufacture of jewellery, without actually being set as jewellery were subject to an ad valorem tax of 20% its value. However, artistic antiquities produced more than one hundred years prior to the date of importation could be imported into the United States duty-free; that is to say, without having to pay a 20% tax. The final decision of the lawsuit was released on 4 June 1930. In that decision, the court determined that the unset 78.625 carats (15,725.0 mg) Nassak Diamond was not an artistic antiquity and was suitable for use in manufacture of jewellery. In particular, the court said that the 1930 Nassak Diamond was nothing more than "a large diamond, cut in an ordinary way." As a result, the importer owed an ad valorem tax of 20% of the diamond's value under US Tariff Act of 1922.

== Harry Winston's influence ==
In 1930, the Nassak Diamond had a somewhat elongated triangle form with rounded corners. The depth of one side of the triangle was thicker than the other. The diamond was "without flaw, unusually brilliant, and so cut as to well display its clear, crystal brilliancy." While on exhibit at the 1933 World's Fair in Chicago, Illinois, the "Official guide book of the fair, 1933" described the diamond as a flawless, blue- white stone with a reputation of being "the finest diamond outside crown jewels collections."

In 1940, American jeweller Harry Winston acquired the Nassak Diamond in Paris, France and recut it to its present flawless 43.38 carats (8.676 g) emerald cut shape. Winston sold the diamond to a New York jewellery firm in 1942. In 1944, Commander William Bateman Leeds Jr., millionaire son of the inventor of a tin plating process and friend of George Mauboussin, purchased the diamond for his wife, Reflexion Olive Leeds (born Olive Hamilton), and gave it to her in a set ring as a sixth anniversary present.

== Present information ==
In early 1964, gemologist G. Robert (Bob) Crowningshield evaluated the Nassak Diamond at the Gemological Institute of America gem laboratory to produce a Diamond Grading Report. In that same year, the Nassak Diamond was placed in the hands of J. & S.S. DeYoung, a then 100-year-old estate jewellery house located in New York. The Gemological Institute of America Diamond Grading Report that came with the diamond indicated that it was Internally Flawless.

In early April 1970, the diamond was rated one of the thirty great stones of the world and placed on display at Parke-Bernet Galleries in New York City. On 16 April 1970, the diamond was sold at auction for $500,000 (allowing for inflation, this would now be $4.05 million) to Edward J. Hand, a then 48-year-old trucking firm executive from Greenwich, Connecticut. This was the second highest auction price ever for a diamond at that time, the first being circa $1.1 million for the Taylor-Burton Diamond several years earlier. Six years later, the diamond was placed on display in November 1976 at a charity benefit as a means to attract donors to that benefit.

== Trivia ==
In December 1982, British Midland Airways purchased a McDonnell Douglas DC-9 aircraft from KLM; two months later, the plane was in the United Kingdom with the name "The Nassak Diamond".

== See also ==
- Koh-i-Noor
- Darya-ye Noor
- List of diamonds
