= David Whatton =

Chief Constable David Whatton QPM
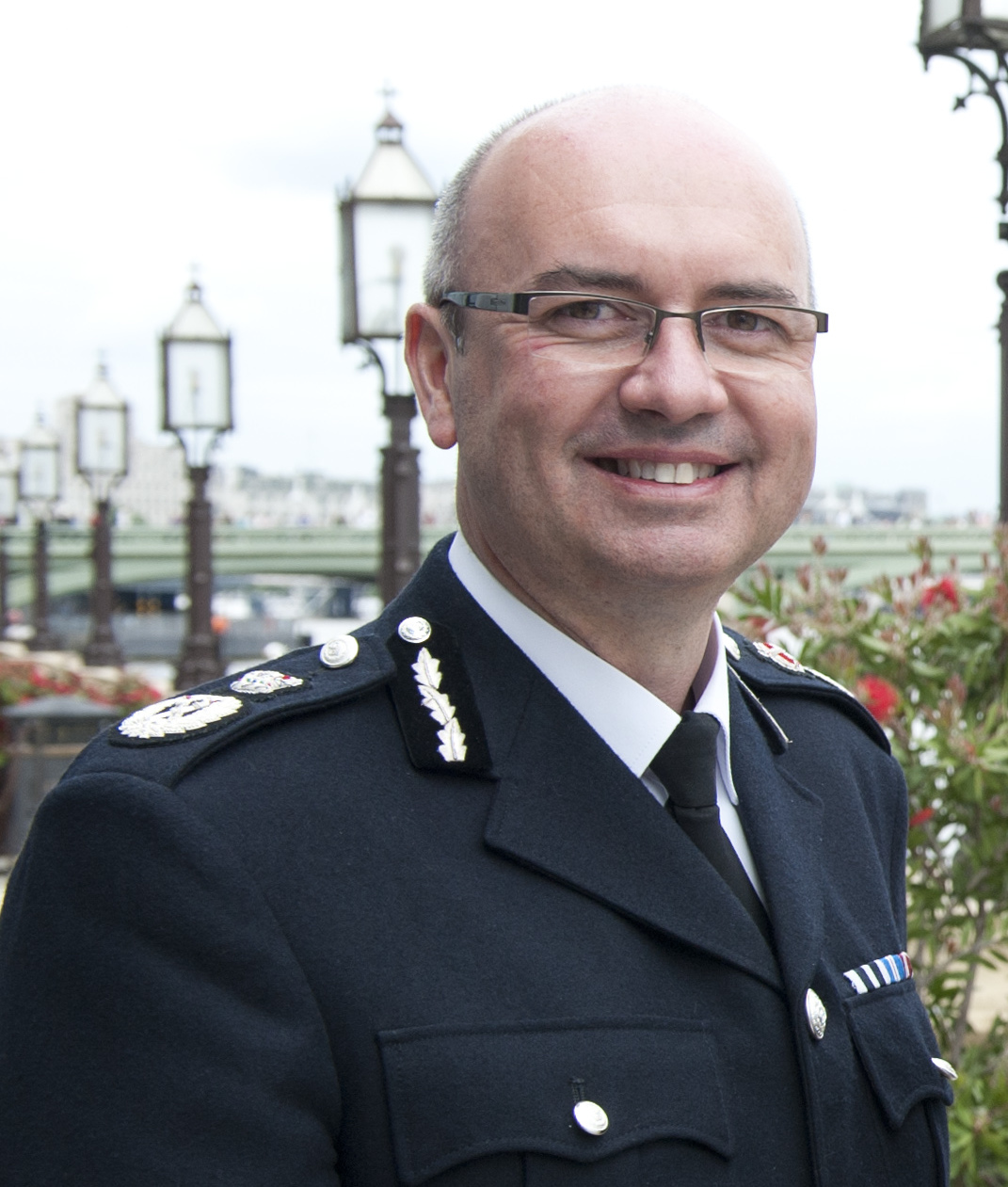
- Whatton in 2013

Chief constable of Cheshire Constabulary
- In office December 2008 – June 2014
- Preceded by: Peter Fahy
- Succeeded by: Simon Byrne

Chief constable of Greater Manchester Police Acting
- In office March 2008 – September 2008
- Preceded by: Michael J. Todd
- Succeeded by: Peter Fahy

Deputy chief constable of Greater Manchester Police
- In office October 2006 – March 2008
- Chief constable: Michael J. Todd
- Succeeded by: Simon Byrne

David Whatton is a retired British senior police officer. He was the chief constable of Cheshire Constabulary in Cheshire, England. He has previously held chief police officer roles with the West Midlands Police and Greater Manchester Police.

== Career ==
David Whatton joined the West Midlands Police in April 1983. In December 2002 he joined Greater Manchester Police (GMP) from the West Midlands Police as assistant chief constable and became deputy chief constable.

He assumed the role of acting chief constable for GMP after the death of Michael J. Todd, the chief constable who died in Snowdonia on 11 March 2008.

In October 2008 it was announced Whatton was to become the new chief constable of Cheshire Constabulary when the previous incumbent, Peter Fahy, became the new chief constable of GMP. He took up the role officially on 1 December 2008. In January 2010 he was awarded the Queen's Police Medal.

During his time as chief constable of Cheshire Constabulary, Whatton served as the National Policing Lead for Violence and public Protection for the College of Policing and Association of Chief Police Officers (ACPO).

Whatton retired from the police in June 2014. He was succeeded by the then Metropolitan Police Assistant Commissioner Simon Byrne who was unanimously approved to be Cheshire's next chief constable in February 2014.

== Honours ==

Ribbon	Description	Notes
	Queen's Police Medal (QPM)	2010
	Queen Elizabeth II Golden Jubilee Medal	2002; UK version of this medal
	Queen Elizabeth II Diamond Jubilee Medal	2012; UK version of this medal
	Police Long Service and Good Conduct Medal	

Police appointments
Preceded by Alan Green	Greater Manchester Police; Deputy Chief Constable; 2006–2008	Succeeded by Ian Seabridge (Acting)
Preceded by Michael J. Todd	Chief constable of Greater Manchester Police (Acting); March 2008– September 2008	Succeeded by Peter Fahy
Preceded by Graeme Gerrard (Acting)	Cheshire Constabulary; Chief constable December 2008 – June 2014	Succeeded by Simon Byrne
