= Ian Hopkins =

British police officer

Chief Constable Ian Hopkins QPM

Chief Constable of Greater Manchester Police
- In office October 2015 – December 2020
- Deputy: Ian Pilling
- Preceded by: Sir Peter Fahy
- Succeeded by: Stephen Watson

Deputy Chief Constable of Greater Manchester Police
- In office December 2011 – October 2015
- Chief Constable: Sir Peter Fahy
- Preceded by: Simon Byrne
- Succeeded by: Ian Pilling

Personal details
- Awards: Queen's Police Medal (2016)

Ian Hopkins QPM is a former senior British police officer. From October 2015 to December 2020, he was the Chief Constable of Greater Manchester Police.

== Career ==
Hopkins joined Greater Manchester Police (GMP) in April 2008 on promotion to assistant chief constable. He started his career in Staffordshire Police in 1989 and has served in Northamptonshire Police and Cheshire Police. In 2011 he undertook a three-month secondment as syndicate director for the Strategic Command Course.

=== Deputy Chief Constable ===
He was appointed Deputy Chief Constable of Greater Manchester Police in December 2011 with responsibility for force performance, the Force Change Programme and corporate communications.

His GMP career was soon subject of censure: in 2013 he was formally advised regarding his conduct when he took his family to watch a Coldplay concert at the Etihad stadium on 9 June, paying for five £55 tickets out of his own pocket. When he turned up for the gig, his party was invited to sit in empty corporate seats, The Hopkins party also accepted tea, coffee and Lancashire Hotpot valued at £25.

Originally, the officer’s entry on the register of hospitality and gifts stated the gig had been at the Manchester Arena, that he had only received food and drink worth £5 and failed to reflect how his party had been bumped up to a corporate section. The Investigation discovered that on a separate occasion, Mr Hopkins bought four tickets at £50 each to attend a Take That concert at the Etihad stadium on 7 June 2011. His party accepted soft drinks, tea, coffee and a glass of wine valued at £100. The officer’s original entry had failed to reflect his party had again been moved to corporate seats.

Mr Hopkins amended the entries following the intervention of Sir Peter Fahy

He has also added two new entries. One states he paid £65 each for four tickets for a Bruce Springsteen concert on 22 June. The party was again bumped up to better seats although no other hospitality was accepted.

The second new entry reveals Mr Hopkins accepted three tickets, one adult and two juniors, for City’s Champions League game against Real Madrid on 21 November.

The officer made a £50 donation to the City In The Community scheme to cover the theoretical value of the tickets, according to the register.

On each of the four visits to the Etihad, Mr Hopkins accepted the hospitality from City’s head of safety and security who was a former superintendent at GMP.

=== Chief Constable ===
Ian Hopkins was promoted to chief constable of GMP in October 2015. Controversy soon followed his appointment. On 16 May 2016, Hopkins had been present at a party for Senior Women In Policing when ACC Rebekah Sutcliffe verbally attacked a junior colleague, Superintendent Sarah Jackson. An argument ensued between the two about surgically enhanced breasts. Hopkins had recognised Sutcliffe was drunk and had texted Jackson to look after her before leaving the subordinate alone to face a verbal attack by Sutcliffe. Sarah Jackson left GMP shortly after the incident for Cumbria and was promoted.

=== Police cuts ===
Hopkins is concerned that cuts to police funding will reduce the effectiveness of the Greater Manchester Police. Hopkins maintains he had hoped for 6300 officers by March 2021 but now expects only 5709 officers, which is fewer than there were in 1975. Hopkins stated:

Clearly we would always look to save money without job cuts, but the reality is 83% of our budget is people and after eight years of efficiencies across all parts of the organisation – which has seen us make reductions of £183m – there would be little alternative but to cut posts, both officers and staff. (...) This would just get worse as we would have to further prioritise against threat, harm and risk, screen out more and more crime. Essentially we would just have to focus on providing a response function, a serious and organised crime capability and a custody function as the core capabilities of policing.

The perception by Hopkins that GMP would struggle to cope led him to launch the "Citizens Contract" which sought to explain a reduced Police Offer. However, this was later described as "Complete Tosh" and "Patronising nonsense" by Hopkins replacement Chief Constable Steve Watson.

=== End of Police career ===
Hopkins's career was brought to an end when he was forced to stand down in 2020. GMP had undergone a HMICFRS inspection that had found they had failed to record 80,000 crimes, he initially sought to indicate he had voluntarily stepped aside, but it soon emerged that he had been required to leave office by Andy Burnham Mayor for Greater Manchester.

Further details emerged that even though he had been removed he had continued to claim his salary.

=== Honours ===
Hopkins was awarded the Queen's Police Medal for distinguished service in the 2016 Birthday Honours.

=== Failure to be awarded a knighthood ===
GMP's Chief Constables have traditionally been awarded knighthoods for their leadership. This does not include the first Chief Constable, James William Richards, who only served a brief period upon GMP's amalgamation or Michael Todd, who died suddenly while still serving). Apart from these, every other Chief Constable has been knighted. Sir James Anderton was knighted in 1990, Sir David Wilmott in 2002 and Sir Peter Fahy in 2012.

Ian Hopkins has not been knighted, as the honour is bestowed while serving (and he was effectively removed from office); it is, therefore, unlikely that he ever will be.

Ribbon	Description	Notes
	Queen's Police Medal (QPM)	2016 Birthday Honours
	Queen Elizabeth II Golden Jubilee Medal	2002; UK version of this medal
	Queen Elizabeth II Diamond Jubilee Medal	2012; UK version of this medal
	Police Long Service and Good Conduct Medal	

Police appointments
Preceded by Simon Byrne	Deputy Chief Constable of Greater Manchester Police; 2011 to 2015	Succeeded by Ian Pilling
Preceded by Sir Peter Fahy	Chief Constable of Greater Manchester Police; 2015 to 2020	Succeeded by Stephen Watson
