= Peter Fahy =

British police officer (born 1959)

Chief Constable Sir Peter Fahy QPM
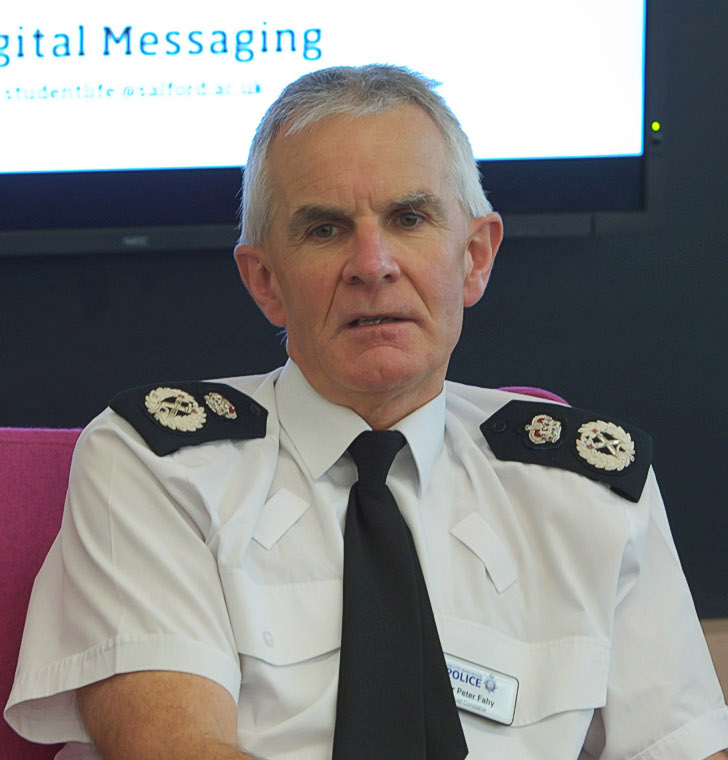
- Fahy in 2012

Chief Constable of Greater Manchester Police
- In office 1 September 2008 – 30 October 2015
- Deputy: Simon Byrne; Ian Hopkins
- Preceded by: Michael J. Todd; David Whatton (Acting)
- Succeeded by: Ian Hopkins

Chief Constable of Cheshire Constabulary
- In office 2002 – 31 October 2008
- Succeeded by: Graeme Gerrard (Acting); David Whatton

Personal details
- Born: 18 January 1959 (age 67) London, England
- Spouse: Jenny Fahy
- Education: University of Hull; University of East Anglia

Sir Peter Martin Fahy (born 18 January 1959 in London, England) is a retired senior British police officer. He was the chief constable of Greater Manchester Police (GMP), the United Kingdom's third largest police force. He retired from the police force on 23 October 2015 after serving for 34 years.

== Early life and education ==
Fahy holds a degree in French and Spanish from the University of Hull, and a master's degree from the University of East Anglia.

== Police career ==
He joined the police in 1981, and was the ACPO spokesman on workforce development.

Before taking up this post at GMP on 1 September 2008, he was the chief constable of Cheshire Constabulary, a post he held since 2002. He had been assistant chief constable at Surrey and had had positions with Hertfordshire and West Midlands forces.

Fahy has previously expressed his frustration at red tape which has been creeping into police forces across the United Kingdom. In July 2011, Fahy commanded his officers to use their common sense and criticised police policies which prevents the police from helping victims or protecting the public in certain cases. In July 2011, Fahy was one of the frontrunners to replace Sir Paul Stephenson as the Metropolitan Police commissioner but Fahy ruled himself out of that position.

In July 2013, it was announced that his contract had been extended for a further three years by Greater Manchester Police Commissioner Tony Lloyd. After 30 years service, Fahy was eligible for retirement, and his contract would have ended on 31 August 2013.

Fahy was the Association of Chief Police Officers (ACPO) lead of Specials Constabulary.

In January 2014, the Crown Prosecution Service announced that they would be prosecuting him under health and safety legislation over the death of Anthony Grainger.

However, in January 2015, William Boyce, at Liverpool Crown Court accepted an 'abuse of process' argument from the defence.

== Later life ==
In October 2015, Fahy was appointed an honorary professor of Criminal Justice by the University of Manchester. He gave his first public lecture on 11 November 2015. It was entitled; Thinking about police and public in a more divided world: reflections on 34 years of policing.

Peter Fahy became chair of trustees of the charity We Stand Together in November 2017. He had originally established the #WeStandTogether campaign in response to the Charlie Hebdo shooting and other attacks across Europe. We Stand Together was established as a charity in May 2018 in response to the Manchester Arena Attack.

In March 2021, Fahy criticised the proposed Police, Crime, Sentencing and Courts Bill, which he argued was a politically-motivated reaction to Black Lives Matter and Extinction Rebellion protests.

== Honours ==
Fahy was knighted in the 2012 Birthday Honours "for services to policing".

Ribbon	Description	Notes
	Knight Bachelor (Kt)	June 2012
	Queen's Police Medal (QPM)	January 2004
	Queen Elizabeth II Golden Jubilee Medal	2002; UK version of this medal
	Queen Elizabeth II Diamond Jubilee Medal	2012; UK version of this medal
	Police Long Service and Good Conduct Medal	

- In 2018 he was awarded the honorary degree of Doctor of Laws (LLD) from the University of Chester.

Police appointments
Preceded by Unknown	Chief Constable of Cheshire Constabulary; 2002–2008	Succeeded by Graeme Gerrard (acting); David Whatton
Preceded by Michael J. Todd	Chief Constable of Greater Manchester Police; 2008–2015	Succeeded by Ian Hopkins
