= Matt Baggott =

British police officer

Chief Constable Sir Matt Baggott CBE QPM
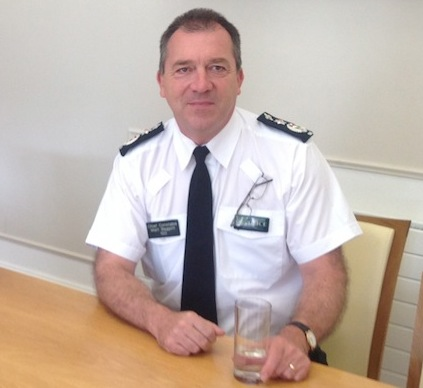
- Baggott in 2013
- Born: 1959 (age 66–67); London, England
- Police career
- Department: Police Service of Northern Ireland
- Rank: Chief Constable
- Awards: Knight Bachelor; Commander of the Order of the British Empire; Queen's Police Medal

Sir Matthew David Baggott, CBE, QPM (born 1959) is a retired senior British police officer. He was Chief Constable of the Police Service of Northern Ireland from 2009 to 2014.

== Career ==
Baggott joined the Metropolitan Police in 1978. He moved to West Midlands Police as Assistant Chief Constable in 1998, and was promoted to Deputy Chief Constable in 2001. He was appointed Chief Constable of Leicestershire Constabulary in 2002.

In September 2009, he succeeded Sir Hugh Orde as Chief Constable of the Police Service of Northern Ireland. In January 2014, it was announced that he would retire from the PSNI in September 2014, having decided that he would not apply to extend his contract. On 5 June 2014, he announced that he would retire earlier than planned; stepping down on 29 June.

He was President of the Christian Police Association.

== Honours ==
Baggott was awarded the Queen's Police Medal (QPM) in the 2004 Birthday Honours, and was appointed Commander of the Order of the British Empire (CBE) in the 2008 New Year Honours "for services to the Police". He was knighted in the 2015 New Year Honours for services to policing.

Ribbon	Description	Notes
	Knight Bachelor	2015
	Order of the British Empire (CBE)	2008; Commander; Civil Division
	Queen's Police Medal (QPM)	2004
	Queen Elizabeth II Golden Jubilee Medal	2002; UK version of this medal
	Queen Elizabeth II Diamond Jubilee Medal	2012; UK version of this medal
	Police Long Service and Good Conduct Medal	

== Footnotes ==
Police appointments
Preceded by David Wyrko	Chief Constable of Leicestershire; 2002–2009	Succeeded by Simon Cole
Preceded by Judith Gillespie (acting)	Chief Constable of the Police Service of Northern Ireland; 2009—2014	Succeeded by George Hamilton
