= North West Police Underwater Search and Marine Unit =

The North West Police Underwater Search & Marine Unit are based in the North West of England, and deliver specialist underwater search, confined space searches and marine policing from the Scottish border to Mid-Wales.

== Collaboration ==
The Unit is a collaboration between six police forces (Merseyside Police, Greater Manchester Police, Cheshire Constabulary, Cumbria Constabulary, Lancashire Constabulary and North Wales Police), with Officers from each Force being seconded to the Unit.

All the officers on the unit are qualified commercial divers, and hold a range of boating and other specialist qualifications, including confined space search techniques.

Because the unit also operates in Wales, "Heddlu", the Welsh word for police can also be seen displayed on some of the unit's boats and vehicles.

== Role ==
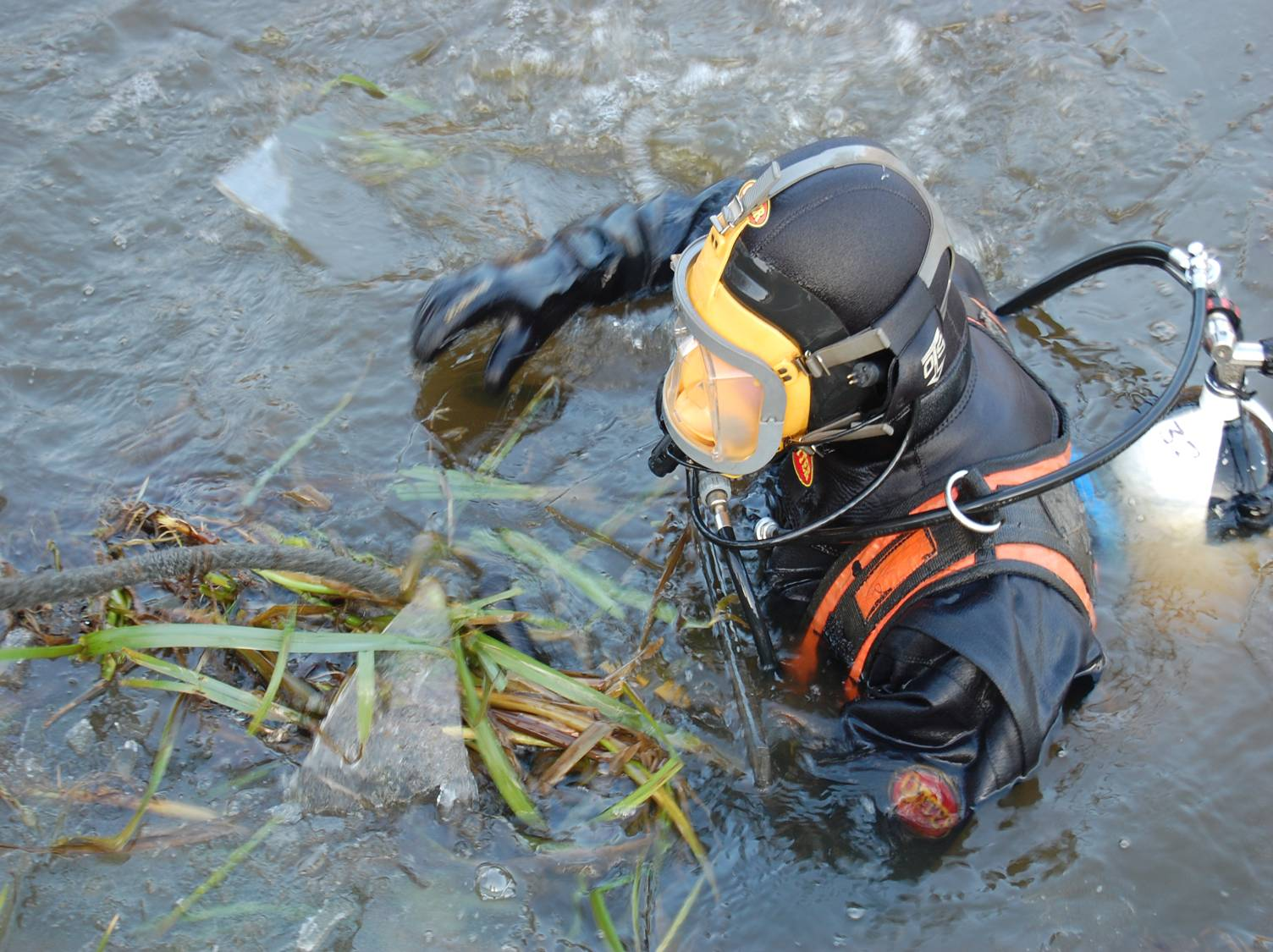
A North West Police Underwater Search & Marine Unit officer conducting a search in sub-zero conditions.

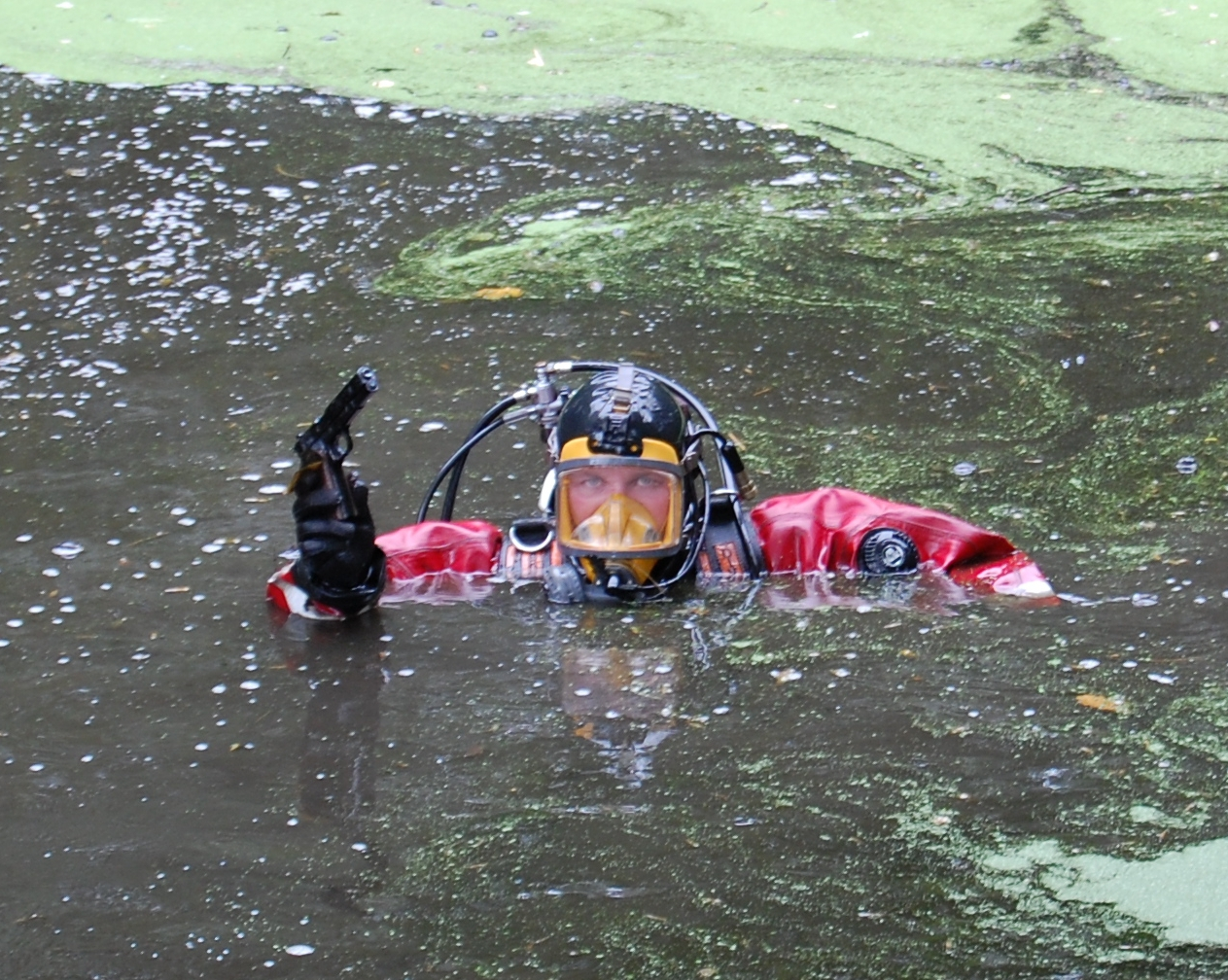
A firearm is recovered by an officer from the North West Police Underwater Search & Marine Unit.

The tasks that the unit undertake, apart from being challenging, are both wide and varied. As well as being involved in the recovery of bodies from water, security and evidential searches are a regular activity. This will include the searching of ponds, weirs, reservoirs, rivers, streams, canals, docks, lakes, quarries, with some of these at altitude.

The unit also provides a police presence up to 12 nautical miles (22 km; 14 mi) out to sea. They police parts of the coastline of the Irish Sea.

The unit is available to forces during times of flooding, such as those seen in Cumbria in 2009.

As well as performing the duties across the North West region for the member police forces, they regularly work alongside other UK law enforcement agencies, such HM Customs, UK Visas and Immigration and the Royal Navy.

The unit carries out drug enforcement operations such as ship hull searches.

== History ==
In the 1970s, Merseyside Police, Greater Manchester Police and Cheshire Constabulary joined together to form the Joint Underwater Search Unit.

In 1987, a police diver from North Wales Police joined the Unit.

In the 1970s, Cumbria and Lancashire Constabularies had a combined Underwater Search Team.

In 2003, both police diving teams merged to become the North West Underwater Search Unit.

From that time to present, the unit has continued to develop not only in diving techniques but also by developing a marine policing function.

== Equipment ==
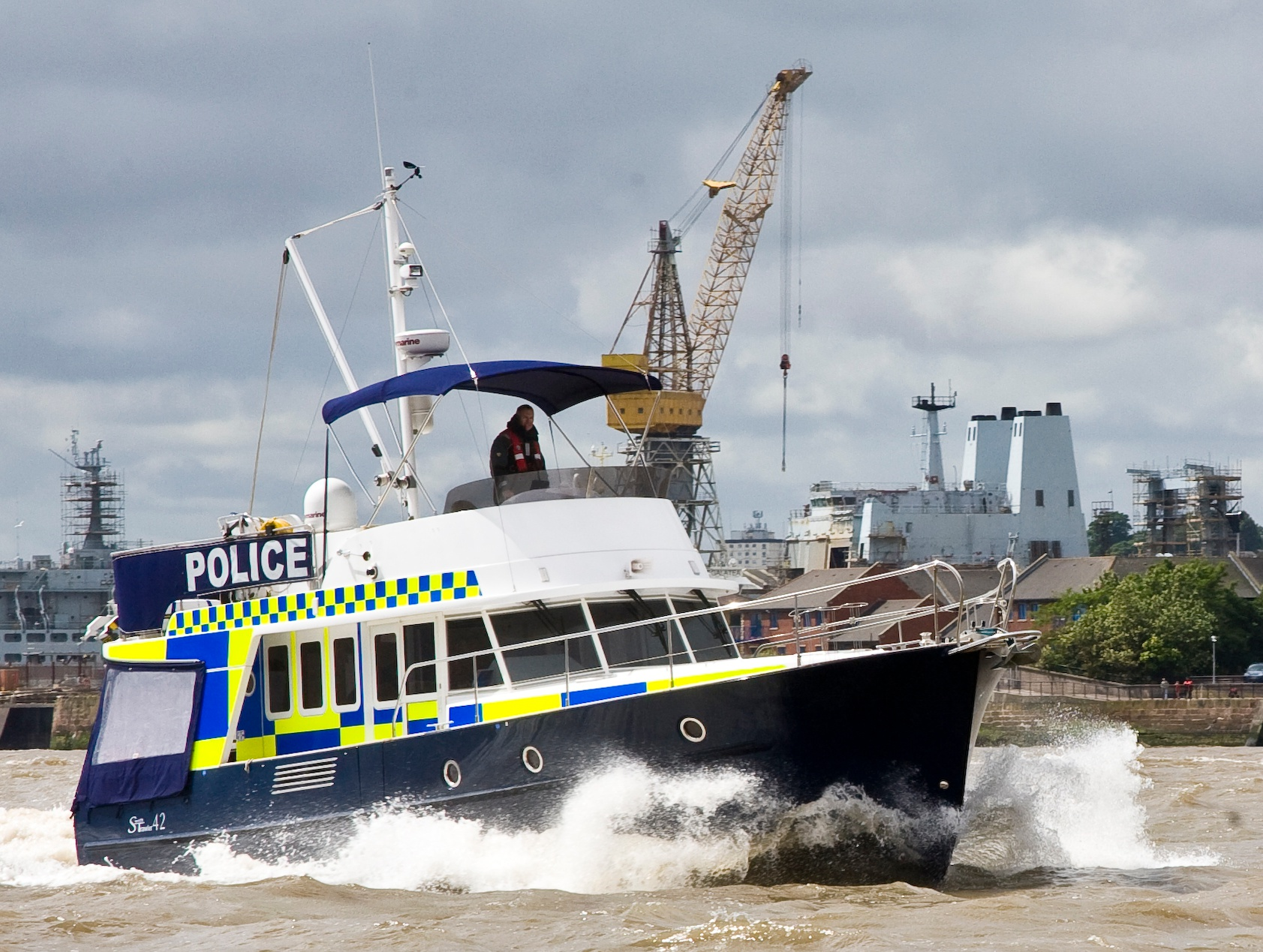
Consortium, the vessel previously used by the North West Police Underwater Search & Marine Unit until December 2017.

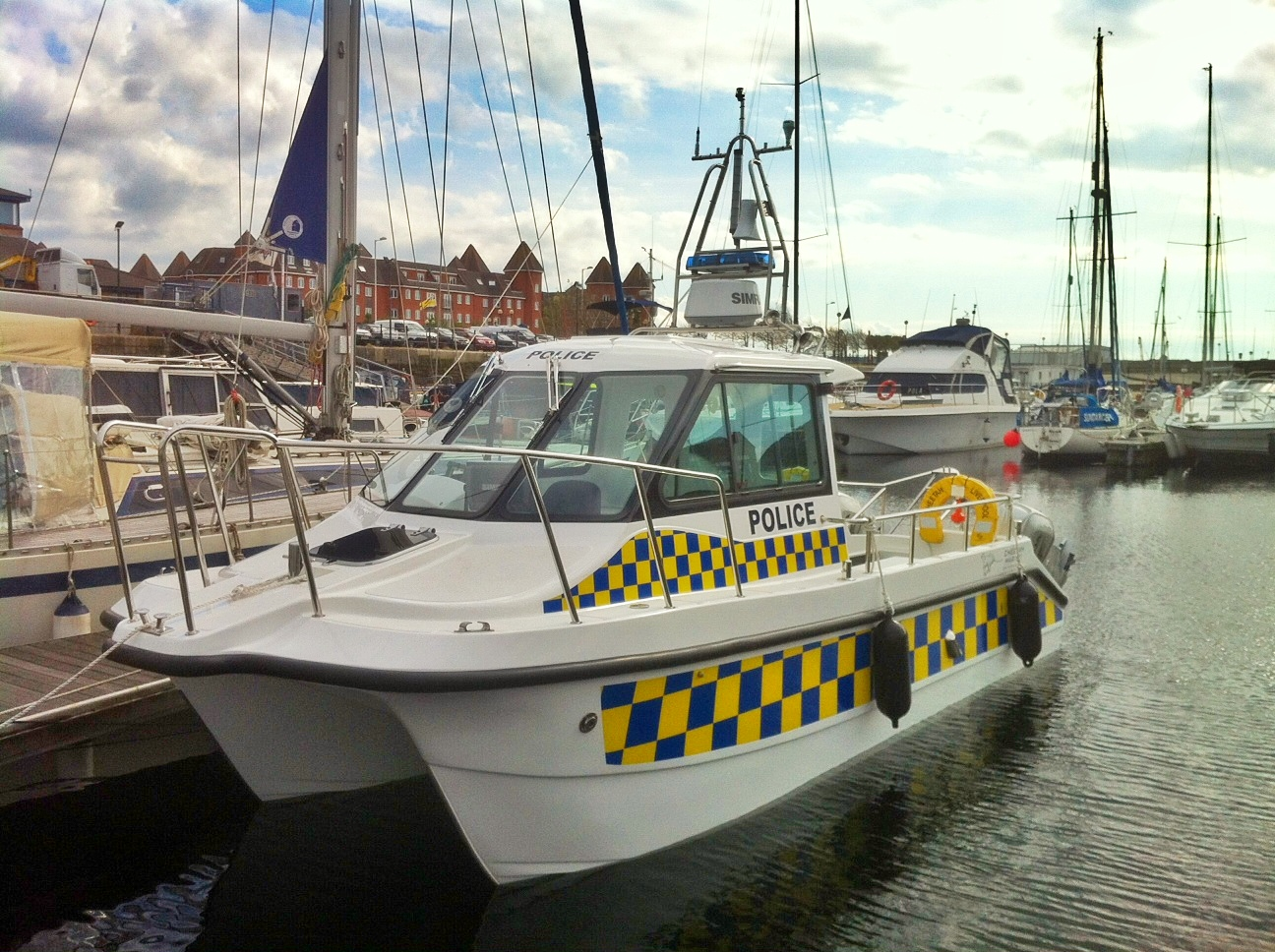
A Cheetah catamaran acquired by the unit in 2012, to be used during the London Olympics.

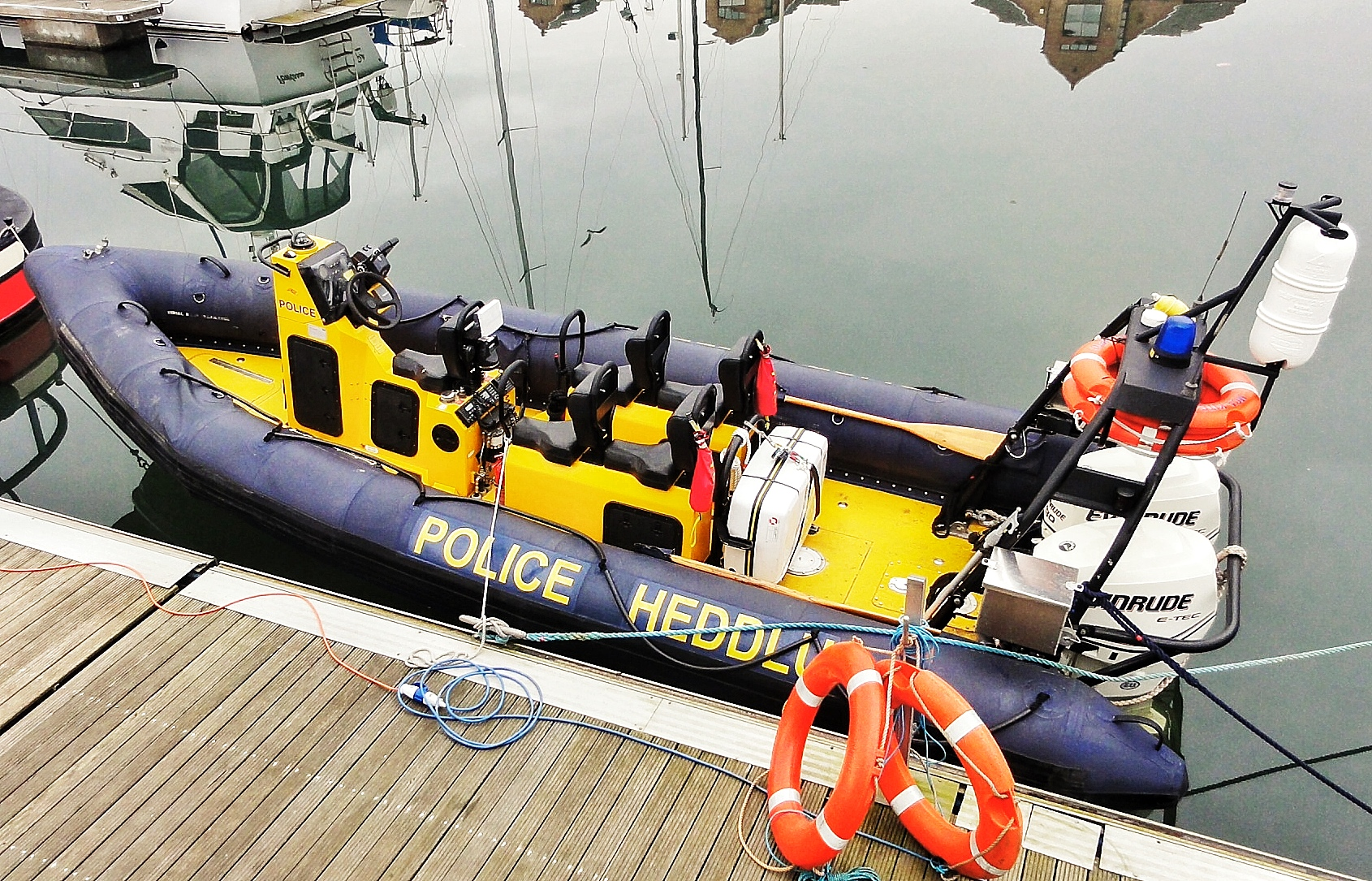
A rigid-hulled inflatable boat (RIB) used by the unit. Note that it is marked as both POLICE and HEDDLU, as it operates in both England and Wales.

In order to maximise their efficiency and capability, the unit utilise specialist electronic search equipment, including side-scan sonar, scanning sonar, remotely operated vehicle (ROV).

The unit has a close working partnership with the Home Office Centre for Applied Science and Technology, and takes part in research and trials of specialist equipment.

For deployments and operations, the unit previously used a 13-metre (43 ft) police launch, called Consortium, which was replaced in December 2017 with a 10.2-metre (33 ft) metre catamaran, called The Cormorant, after Consortium was damaged during an accident with a tug boat and a tanker. They also use several high powered Rigid Inflatable Boats, a 7.2-metre (24 ft) Cheetah Marine catamaran, and a number of inflatables for use on water that is restricted or difficult to access.

In support of dive operations the unit use a purpose built truck, which integrates with the technology used by the team and provides an essential land based facility to the divers.
