= Judith Gillespie =

British police officer

Judith Gillespie CBE
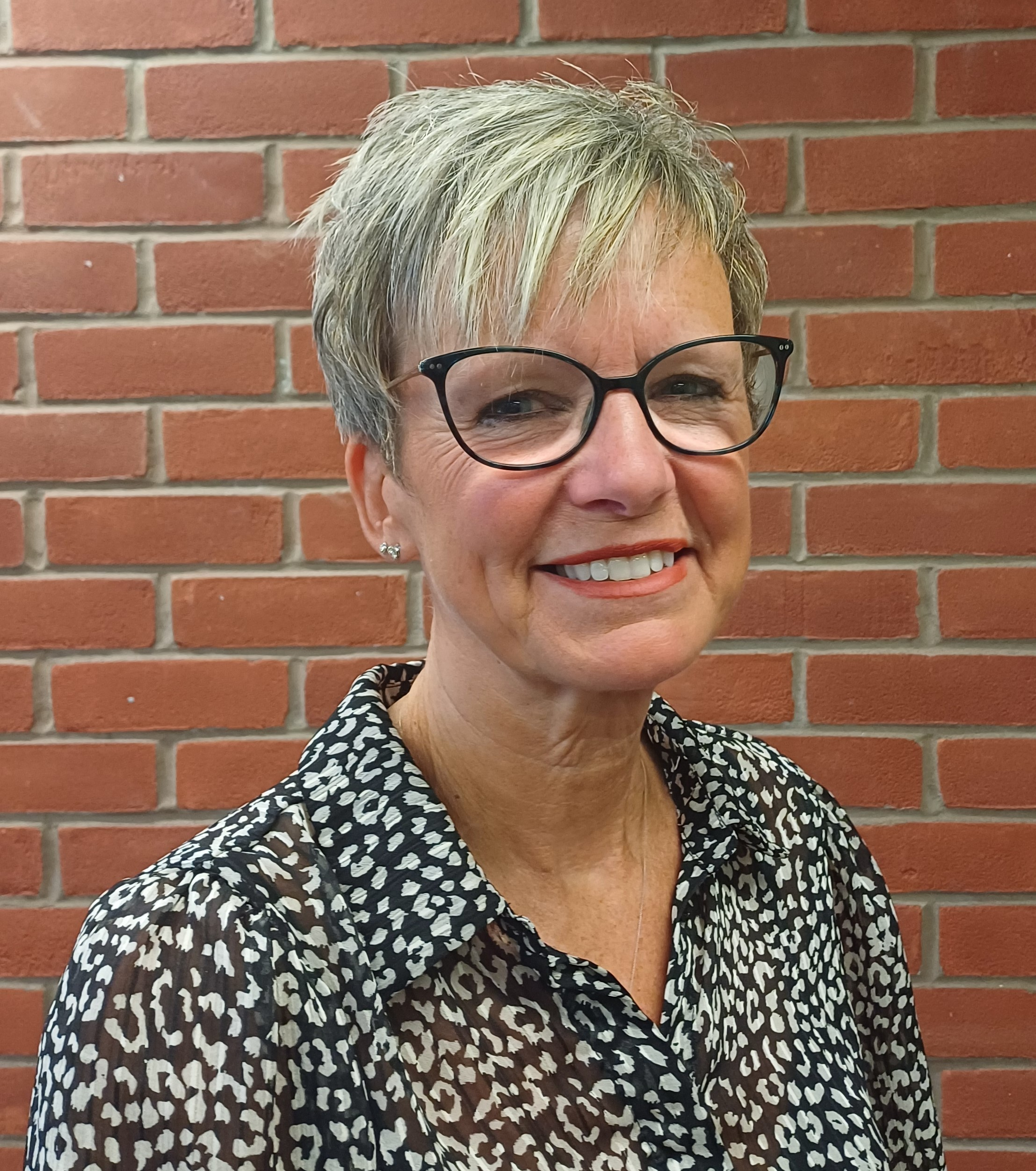

Deputy Chief Constable of the Police Service of Northern Ireland
- In office 1 June 2009 – 31 March 2014
- Preceded by: Paul Leighton
- Succeeded by: Drew Harris

Acting Chief Constable of the Police Service of Northern Ireland
- In office August 2009 – September 2009
- Preceded by: Sir Hugh Orde
- Succeeded by: Sir Matt Baggott

Personal details
- Born: Judith Kyle Gillespie; November 1962 (age 63) Belfast, Northern Ireland
- Citizenship: United Kingdom
- Children: 2 daughters
- Education: University of Cambridge
- Profession: Police officer

Judith Kyle Gillespie, CBE (born November 1962) is a retired senior police officer. She was the Deputy Chief Constable of the Police Service of Northern Ireland between June 2009 and March 2014.

== Early life and education ==
Gillespie was born and raised in North Belfast and was educated at Belfast Royal Academy She completed a Bachelor of Arts (BA) degree in public policy and administration in 1992. She went on to study for a master's degree in applied criminology at the University of Cambridge, which she completed in 2005.

== Police career ==
Gillespie began her policing career when she joined the Royal Ulster Constabulary (RUC) in 1982 as a police constable. During her initial training at Enniskillen, she was awarded the Baton of Honour. She had previously been rejected by the RUC because of her gender. She spent her early career policing the Greater Belfast area. She was promoted to chief inspector in 1997, superintendent in 1999, and chief superintendent in 2002.

In 2003, she attended the Strategic Command Course at the Police Staff College, Bramshill. In 2004, she was appointed assistant chief constable. This made her the first female to reach chief officer rank in the Police Service of Northern Ireland. On 1 June 2009, she was promoted to deputy chief constable, becoming the second most senior police officer in Northern Ireland. She served as acting chief constable from August 2009 to September 2009. In March 2011, she was given the opportunity to retire early with a £500,000 severance package but chose to continue her career. She retired from the police on 31 March 2014.

A keen sportswoman, she played hockey and squash for the RUC. In 2013, when the World Police and Fire Games was held in Belfast, Northern Ireland, she served as the chair of the board.

== Personal life ==
Gillespie is married and has two daughters.

She took up running after the death of the sister-in-law from cancer. She has completed the Belfast Marathon relay, Race for Life and the Great North Run, raising money for Marie Curie Cancer Care.

== Honours ==
Gillespie was appointed Officer of the Order of the British Empire (OBE) in the 2009 Birthday Honours for public service. In the 2014 Birthday Honours, she was promoted to Commander of the Order of the British Empire (CBE) for services to policing and the community in Northern Ireland. In July 2012, she was awarded an honorary doctorate by Queen's University Belfast.

Ribbon	Description	Notes
	Order of the British Empire (CBE)	2014 Commander; 2009 Officer; Civil Division
	Queen Elizabeth II Golden Jubilee Medal	2002; UK Version of this Medal
	Queen Elizabeth II Diamond Jubilee Medal	2012; UK Version of this Medal
	Police Long Service and Good Conduct Medal	
	Royal Ulster Constabulary Service Medal	
	Police Service of Northern Ireland Service Medal	

Police appointments
Preceded by Paul Leighton	Deputy Chief Constable of the Police Service of Northern Ireland; June 2009 to March 2014	Succeeded by Drew Harris
Preceded by Sir Hugh Orde	Acting Chief Constable of the Police Service of Northern Ireland; August 2009 to September 2009	Succeeded by Matt Baggott
