= George Hamilton (Northern Ireland police officer) =

Northern Irish police officer (born 1967)

Chief Constable Sir George Hamilton QPM
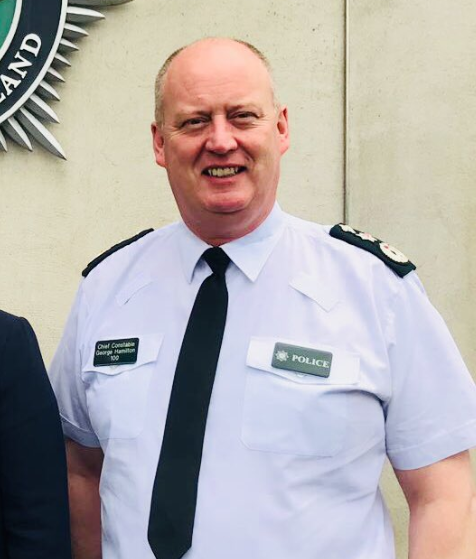
- Hamilton in 2018

Chief Constable of the Police Service of Northern Ireland
- In office 30 June 2014 – 30 June 2019
- Deputy: Drew Harris
- Preceded by: Matt Baggott
- Succeeded by: Simon Byrne

Personal details
- Born: George Ernest Craythorne Hamilton; 27 June 1967 (age 59) Newtownards, County Down, Northern Ireland
- Profession: Police officer
- Salary: £207,000

Sir George Ernest Craythorne Hamilton QPM (born 27 June 1967) is a Northern Ireland retired police officer. From 2014 to 2019, he served as the Chief Constable of the Police Service of Northern Ireland. He was previously the Assistant Chief Constable with responsibility for rural policing.

== Early life and education ==
Hamilton was born on 27 June 1967 in Newtownards, County Down, Northern Ireland. He was educated at Gransha High for Boys, an all-boys state secondary school in Bangor, County Down. He studied politics and economics at the Open University, graduating with a Bachelor of Arts (BA) degree. He also studied at the University of Ulster where he completed a Master of Business Administration (MBA) degree.

== Career ==
Hamilton began his policing career in 1985, when he joined the Royal Ulster Constabulary. In 1994, he was promoted to inspector and seconded to a police force in England.

In 2009, he joined Strathclyde Police as Assistant Chief Constable, returning to the PSNI in 2011 as Assistant Chief Constable Criminal Justice.

=== Chief Constable ===
Hamilton was selected to succeed Matt Baggott as the Chief Constable of the PSNI in May 2014, and took up his post in June of the same year. He was awarded the Queen's Police Medal (QPM) in the 2015 Birthday Honours.

In October 2017 Hamilton, along with Deputy Chief Constable Drew Harris and Assistant Chief Constable Mark Hamilton, were placed under investigation by the Police Ombudsman for Northern Ireland. The inquiry focuses on "concerns about how the Police Service of Northern Ireland conducted an investigation into allegations of bribery and fraud in 2014".

In January 2019, Hamilton announced that he would retire in June 2019. He had been offered a three-year contract extension but he rejected it. On 8 June 2019, as part of the Queen's 2019 Birthday Honours for the United Kingdom, Hamilton was made a Knight Bachelor "for services to Policing and to the community in Northern Ireland."

Hamilton was knighted in the 2019 Birthday Honours for services to policing and the community in Northern Ireland.

== Honours ==

Ribbon	Description	Notes
	Knight Bachelor	2019 Queen's Birthday Honours List
	Queen's Police Medal (QPM)	2015
	Queen Elizabeth II Golden Jubilee Medal	2002; UK version of this medal
	Queen Elizabeth II Diamond Jubilee Medal	2012; UK version of this medal
	Police Long Service and Good Conduct Medal	
	Royal Ulster Constabulary Service Medal	
	Police Service of Northern Ireland Service Medal	

Police appointments
Preceded by Matt Baggott	Chief Constable of the Police Service of Northern Ireland; 2014—2019	Succeeded by Simon Byrne
