= Colin Cramphorn =

British chief constable (1956–2006)

Colin Ralph Cramphorn CBE, QPM, DL, FRSA (1 April 1956 – 30 November 2006) was the Chief Constable of West Yorkshire Police from September 2002 to November 2006.

Colin Cramphorn was educated at Strode's Grammar School, Egham, before joining the Surrey Constabulary in 1975. In September 1981 he went as a Bramshill scholar to the Faculty of Law (as it then was), King's College London, to study for the LL.B., and graduated in June 1984. In 1995 he was appointed an Assistant Chief Constable with West Mercia Constabulary.

In 1998 he moved to the Royal Ulster Constabulary and he was briefly Acting Chief Constable of the RUC's successor, the Police Service of Northern Ireland, prior to the appointment of Sir Hugh Orde in May 2002. Cramphorn continued as Orde's deputy until September 2002, when he was appointed Chief Constable of West Yorkshire Police.

Colin Cramphorn died of prostate cancer in November 2006 at the age of 50.

== Affiliations ==
Cramphorn was a Fellow of the RSA and of the Chartered Management Institute, a member of the Institute of Business Ethics and the Centre for Crime and Justice Studies (formerly the Institute for the Study and Treatment of Delinquency), and an Associate of St George's House, Windsor.

He was also a patron of the Royal Manchester Children's Hospital Research Equipment Fund, a member of the Council of the Order of St John South and West Yorkshire, and a Vice-President of the Yorkshire Society.

In his early days, whilst in Surrey Police, Colin was a committed volunteer at the Guildford Sea Cadets, guiding their Marine Cadet Detachment to become one of the top in the Area. He quickly rose through the ranks becoming a Captain (SCC) RMR, later becoming a volunteer Headquarters Staff Officer for the Sea Cadets nationally.

== Honours ==
In the 2004 New Year Honours, Cramphorn was awarded the Queen's Police Medal. In January 2006, he was appointed to serve as a Deputy Lieutenant for West Yorkshire. In the 2007 New Year Honours, Cramphorn was appointed Commander of the Order of the British Empire posthumously; he had accepted the nomination before his death from prostate cancer, and the appointment was retroactively dated 28 November 2006.

| Ribbon | Description | Notes |
| | Order of the British Empire (CBE) | 28 November 2006; Commander; Civil Division |
| | Queen's Police Medal (QPM) | 2004 |
| | Queen Elizabeth II Golden Jubilee Medal | 2002; UK version of this medal |
| | Police Long Service and Good Conduct Medal | |

- He was made a Deputy Lieutenant for West Yorkshire (DL) in January 2006.
- He was a Fellow of the Royal Society of Arts (FRSA).

Police appointments
| Preceded by Graham Moore | Chief Constable of West Yorkshire Police; 2002–2006 | Succeeded by Norman Bettison |
| Preceded by Ronnie Flanagan | (Acting) Chief Constable of the Police Service of Northern Ireland (PSNI); 2002 | Succeeded by Hugh Orde |
