= Hugh Orde =

British police officer

Chief Constable Sir Hugh Orde OBE QPM
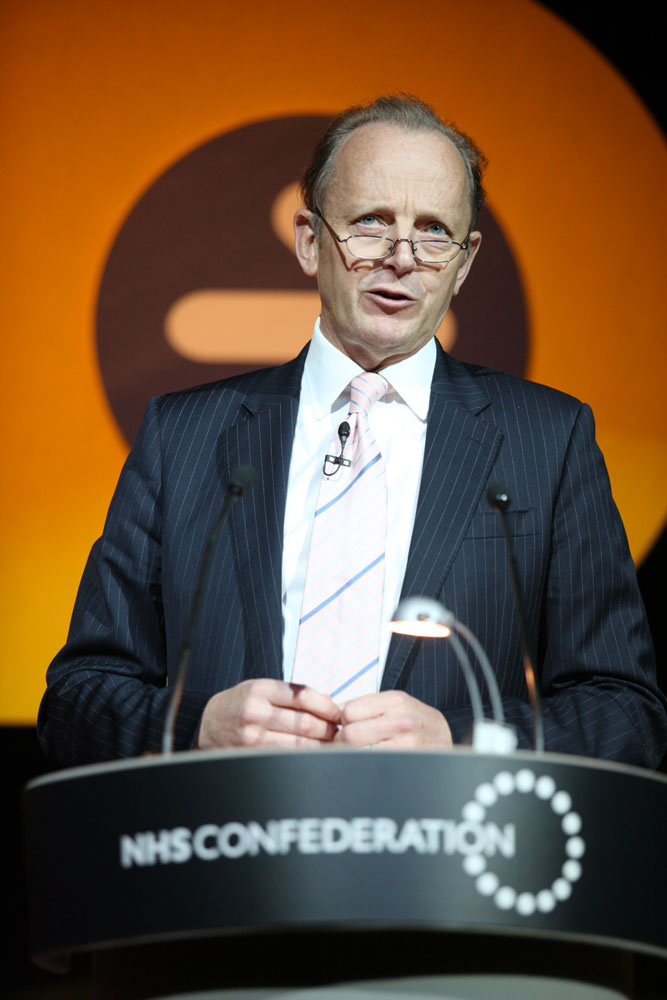
- Orde, speaking at the NHS Confederation Conference in 2012
- Born: Hugh Stephen Roden Orde; 27 August 1958 (age 67); London, United Kingdom
- Police career
- Country: United Kingdom
- Department: Police Service of Northern Ireland
- Rank: Chief Constable
- Awards: Officer of the Order of the British Empire, Queen's Police Medal

Sir Hugh Stephen Roden Orde, OBE, QPM (born 27 August 1958) is a retired British police officer who was the president of the Association of Chief Police Officers (ACPO), representing the 44 police forces of England, Wales and Northern Ireland. Between 2002 and 2009, he was the Chief Constable of the Police Service of Northern Ireland (PSNI). He holds a degree in Public Administration (BA) from the University of Kent.

== Career ==
Orde joined London's Metropolitan Police Service in 1977. He rose quickly through the ranks, becoming a Superintendent in the Territorial Support Group. Later, as Commander responsible for the service's Community Safety and Partnership section, Orde took part in the latter phase of the enquiry into the murder of Stephen Lawrence and its subsequent handling by the police. He became a member (known as a 'graduate') of Common Purpose UK and attended the Matrix course in West London in 1994/95.

While he was a Deputy assistant commissioner, Orde was assigned to the senior staff of the Stevens Report, which investigated government collusion in sectarian killings in Northern Ireland. He was appointed as an Officer of the Order of the British Empire (OBE) in 2001. Hugh Orde was appointed Chief Constable of the PSNI (which replaced the Royal Ulster Constabulary) on 29 May 2002, taking over from Acting Chief Constable Colin Cramphorn on 1 September 2002. He was knighted for his services to policing in 2005.

In April 2009, he announced he was stepping down as Chief Constable of Northern Ireland to become president of the Association of Chief Police Officers (ACPO), assuming the position in the following autumn and holding it until 2015. After his retirement from Northern Ireland he became director of the Police National Assessment Centre and in November 2013 Patron of the national police charity the Police Roll of Honour Trust, joining Sir Stephen House and Sir Bernard Hogan-Howe as joint patrons. In 2010 he was awarded the Queen's Police Medal.

In a 2010 speech at Oxford in which he discussed the threat of the dissident Irish republican campaign, Orde suggested that "To borrow a phrase from the past, we may be at an 'acceptable level of violence'—albeit at a far lower level than when the phrase was first coined", given that dissident republicans were unlikely to respond to negotiation. Democratic Unionist Party MLA Jimmy Spratt called Orde's comments "outrageous" and an insult to those killed by dissident republicans.

== Honours ==

Ribbon	Description	Notes
	Knight Bachelor (Kt)	2005
	Order of the British Empire (OBE)	2001; Officer; Civil Division
	Queen's Police Medal (QPM)	2010
	Queen Elizabeth II Golden Jubilee Medal	2002; UK version of this medal
	Queen Elizabeth II Diamond Jubilee Medal	2012; UK version of this medal
	Police Long Service and Good Conduct Medal	

- He was awarded an Honorary Doctorate of Civil Law (DCL) from the University of Kent in July 2005.

Police appointments
Preceded by Colin Cramphorn (acting)	Chief Constable of the Police Service of Northern Ireland; 2002–2009	Succeeded by Judith Gillespie (acting)
