= Greater Manchester Police =

English territorial police force

- Abbreviation: GMP

Agency overview
- Formed: 1 April 1974; 52 years ago
- Preceding agency: Manchester and Salford Police
- Employees: 10,950
- Volunteers: 350
- Annual budget: £911 Million
- Legal personality: Police Force

Jurisdictional structure
- Operations jurisdiction: Greater Manchester, England, UK
- Map of Greater Manchester Police area
- Area: 492 square miles (1,300 km^{2})
- Population: 3 Million
- Legal jurisdiction: England & Wales
- Governing body: Mayor of Greater Manchester
- Constituting instrument: Police Act 1996
- General nature: Local civilian police

Operational structure
- Overseen by: His Majesty's Inspectorate of Constabulary and Fire & Rescue Services; Independent Office for Police Conduct
- Headquarters: Manchester
- Constables: 8,550 (of which 183 are special constables)
- Police Community Support Officers: 600
- Mayor responsible: Bev Craig, Mayor of Greater Manchester
- Agency executive: Sir Stephen Watson, Chief Constable
- Command Areas: 6
- Stations: 62

Website
- www.gmp.police.uk

Greater Manchester Police (GMP) is the territorial police force responsible for law enforcement within the metropolitan county of Greater Manchester in North West England.

As of March 2020, Greater Manchester Police employed 6,866 police officers, 3,524 members of police staff, and 560 police community support officers. Additionally, the force has 325 special constables. GMP is headquartered at Central Park, Northampton Road, Newton Heath, Manchester.

In December 2020, GMP was placed into special measures by Her Majesty's Inspectorate of Constabulary and Fire & Rescue Services (HMICFRS), after a watchdog report found that GMP did not record one in five crimes between July 2019 and June 2020. They estimated the force failed to log around 80,100 crimes, a high proportion of which were violent offences. Following the announcement, Chief Constable Ian Hopkins resigned from his post.

== History ==
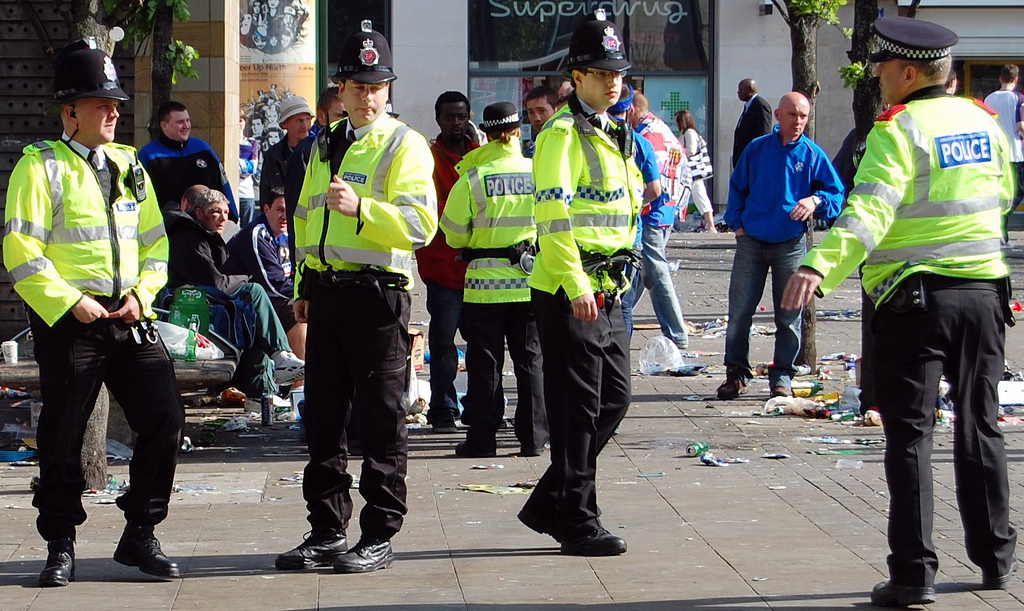
GMP Constables on patrol in Piccadilly Gardens, Manchester, after the 2008 UEFA Cup final

Greater Manchester Police was directly created from two recently amalgamated city police forces, Manchester and Salford Police and parts of what were Lancashire Constabulary, Cheshire Constabulary and West Yorkshire Constabulary on 1 April 1974. The city forces were Manchester Borough Police, which formed in the late 1830s and Salford Borough Police, which began in 1844. Upon Manchester gaining city status in 1853, its police force changed its name to Manchester City Police to reflect its status. In 1926, Salford also became a city, resulting in Salford Borough Police becoming Salford City Police. These two city forces operated until 1968 when, as a result of compulsory amalgamation, as per the Police Act 1964, Salford City Police merged with Manchester City Police, resulting in the new force of Manchester and Salford Police. This new force lasted only six years, when in 1974 the Local Government Act 1972 created the Metropolitan County of Greater Manchester and with it, Greater Manchester Police. An increase of 284,241 acres (115,028 ha) in terms of policing area and 2,267,090 people over the abolished Manchester and Salford Police.

Indirectly, GMP can also trace its heritage to a number of other borough forces, each with their own significant history, which had been abolished in the late 1960s (under the Police Act 1964) and which had been amalgamated into the county forces of Lancashire and Cheshire. These two county forces only policed these boroughs for around six years before Greater Manchester was created and GMP took over responsibility for providing police services. In the historic Lancashire county area these borough police forces were Bolton Borough Police (1839–1969), Oldham Borough Police (1849–1969), Rochdale Borough Police (1857–1969) and Wigan Borough Police (1836–1969). In the historic Cheshire county area this included Stockport Borough Police (at least 1835–1967).

The first chief constable of GMP was William James Richards. Richards had been the chief constable of the short lived Manchester and Salford Police (1968 to 1974) and before that chief constable of Manchester City Police (1966 to 1968). Following his retirement on 30 June 1976, James Anderton became the new chief constable on 1 July 1976. Anderton was a controversial figure during his 15 years in office due to his outspoken style of leadership and hardline views on crime, policing and morality.

In 1991, David Wilmot succeeded Anderton. In 2002, Michael J. Todd was appointed to chief constable until his death in 2008. There was much press coverage of Todd's death in March 2008. Todd was seen as a man of action and got more "bobbies on the beat", with himself often doing so. GMP's Deputy Chief Constable became the acting chief constable until the appointment of Peter Fahy, previously head of Cheshire Police, as chief constable in September 2008.

Constable Ian Rodgers was, in 1975, the first GMP police officer to be killed in the line of duty. His death occurred in a railway incident at Stockport. Since the formation of GMP, 30 officers have been killed or died in the line of duty. GMP then assisted with the reconstruction of Manchester following the 1996 Manchester bombing.

In the 1990s, Manchester had gained the deriding tag of 'Gunchester', in reference to the city's high gun crime rate at the time. Greater Manchester Police faced the problem of gun crime in Manchester, particularly in the deprived districts in south Manchester. Key gang leaders were jailed for life in 2009. By 2011, the city had shaken off the tag.

On 14 October 2010, Greater Manchester Police posted details of all calls made to them in a 24-hour period on Twitter. The service posted details of every incident reported to its officers in 24 hours to demonstrate how much of their time is spent on what the chief constable called "social work" instead of fighting crime. They repeated this exercise on 14 October 2014.

GMP have used social media as a helpful force rather than a hindrance. In the 2011 England riots, with criticism of the role social media such as Twitter and Facebook had in instigating the riots, GMP stated that support on social media had resulted in many responses from members of the public in trying to catch suspects. GMP then named and shamed any individuals convicted due to their involvement in the riots.

=== Chief constables ===
- 1974–1976: William James Richards
- 1976–1991: Sir James Anderton
- 1991–2002: Sir David Wilmot
- 2002–2008: Michael J. Todd
- 2008–2015: Sir Peter Fahy
- 2015–2020: Ian Hopkins
- 2020–2021: Ian Pilling (acting)
- 2021–present: Stephen Watson

=== Officers killed in the line of duty ===
The following officers of Greater Manchester Police are included in the 30 listed by the Police Roll of Honour Trust as having died during the course of their duties:

- PC Fiona Bone, 2012 (killed in firearm and grenade attack; cause of death gunshot wound to the chest)
- PC Nicola Hughes, 2012 (killed in firearm and grenade attack; cause of death gunshot wounds)
- PC Christopher Hart, 2010 (Died in a road traffic incident while on duty responding to a 999 call)
- PC Ian Terry, 2008 (shot during a firearms training exercise)
- PC Allan Shaw, 2006 (died as a result of a Motor Cycle RTC during a special escort training exercise)
- DC Stephen Oake, 2003 (stabbed during anti-terrorism operation, posthumously awarded the Queen's Gallantry Medal)
- PC Alison Armitage, 2001 (run over by a car thief)
- PC Raja Bashrat Ahmed, 1999 (Police motorcycle rammed into oncoming traffic by car thief)
- PC Robert Nathans, 1999 (collapsed and died after pursuing a suspect)
- Inspector Raymond Anthony Codling, 1989 (shot while questioning a suspect on car park at Birch Services M62)
- DC John Sandford, 1982 (attacked while investigating reports of an indecent assault)
- PC John Egerton, 1982 (stabbed during an arrest, posthumously awarded Queen's Commendation for Brave Conduct)

== Governance ==
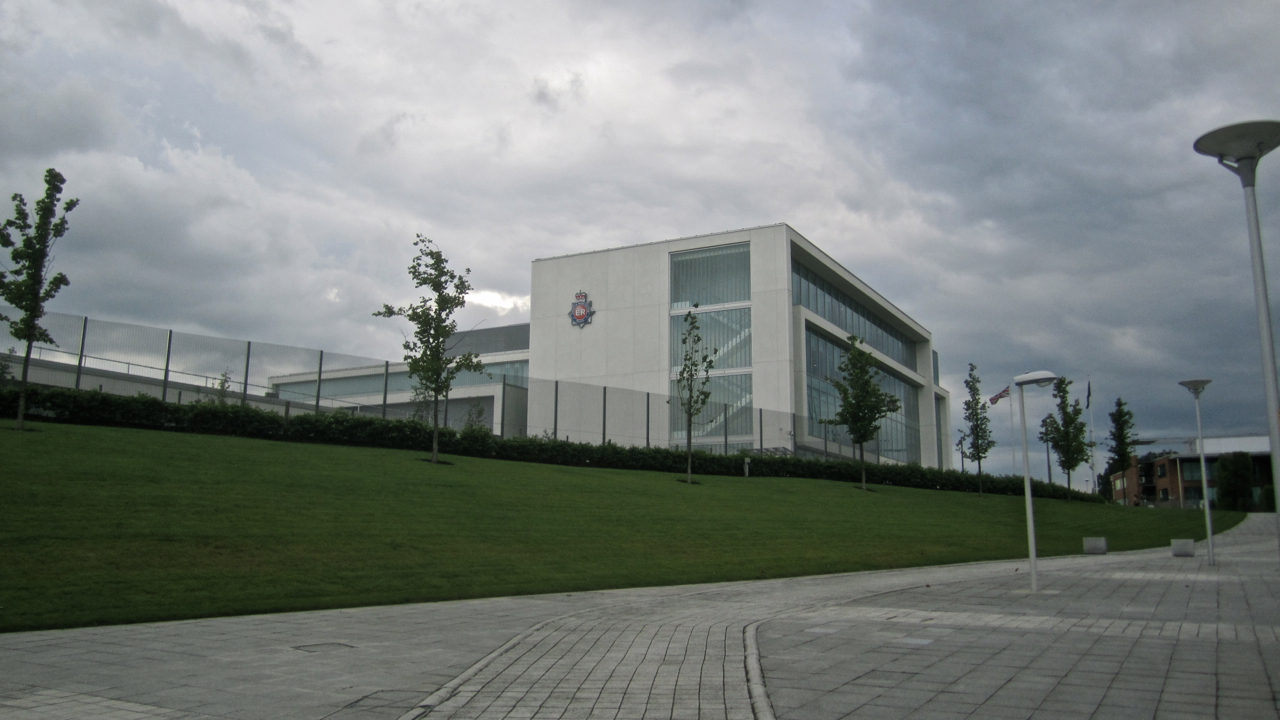
North Manchester divisional headquarters in Central Park, Newton Heath

Prior to 2012 the Greater Manchester Police Authority was the governing body for Greater Manchester Police. In November 2012 responsibility for governance was transferred to the newly created office of Greater Manchester Police and Crime Commissioner, with the first (and only) election for that position being won by Tony Lloyd.

In November 2014, the office of Police and Crime Commissioner was abolished and its responsibilities subsumed into the office of Mayor of Greater Manchester, with Lloyd appointed as interim mayor until the inaugural election in 2017.

Andy Burnham was elected as the inaugural mayor, and served until June 2026. Burnham was succeeded by Bev Craig in August 2026.

The police and crime commissioner was, and subsequently the mayor and their deputy mayor for policing and crime is, scrutinised by the Greater Manchester Police, Fire and Crime Panel which is made up of elected councillors from the local authorities in the police area alongside independent co-opted members.

== Organisation ==
The area GMP polices is split into geographical divisions, with each Metropolitan borough of Greater Manchester being assigned one. In 2021, GMP grouped some divisions together to form command areas, the divisions that remain on their own are also still referred to as a command area. Each command area is run by a chief superintendent, with each 'division' or 'cluster' being led by a superintendent.

As of March 2021, these are the six command areas:

- South command area (Stockport (J) & Trafford (M) Divisions)
- East command area (Tameside (G) & Oldham (Q) Divisions)
- City of Manchester command area (City of Manchester (A) Division)
- Salford command area (Salford (F) Division)
- North command area (Bury (N) & Rochdale (P) Divisions)
- West command area (Bolton (K) & Wigan (L) Divisions)

Manchester Airport (I) Division falls within the Specialist Operations branch.

== GMP units ==
=== Roads Policing Unit ===
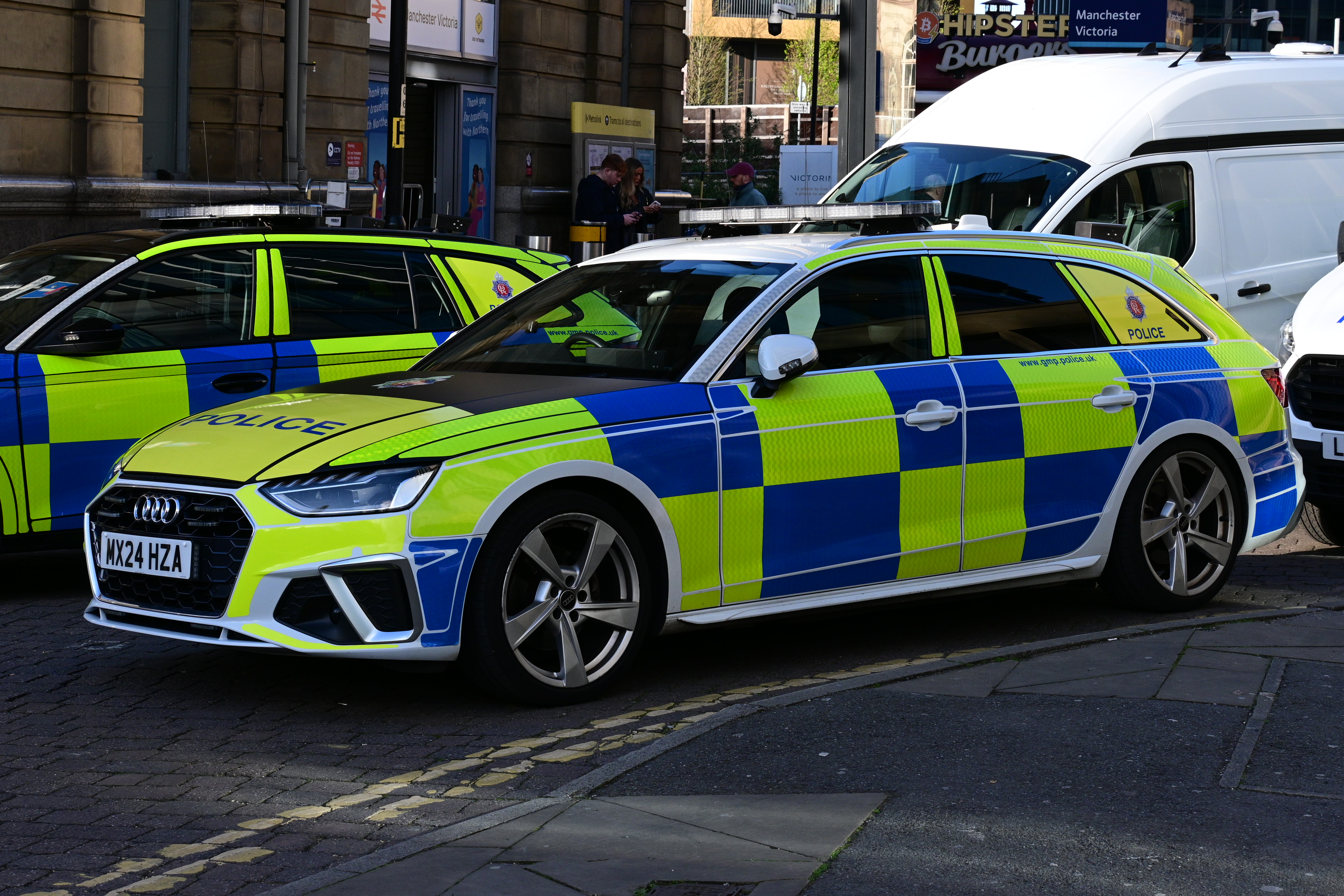
An ANPR equipped Audi A4 road policing unit pictured in 2026

GMP also operates a Roads Policing Unit (RPU) responsible for all traffic policing in the county, which includes over 280 miles (450 km) of motorway.

==== Tactical Vehicle Intercept Unit ====
Under the Roads Policing banner, the Greater Manchester Police also maintains a Tactical Vehicle Intercept Unit (TVIU).

Initially formed as a response to a rise in vehicle-related crime across Greater Manchester (as in the rest of Britain) in the early 1980s, the TVIU (then called the Traffic Area Support Services or TASS) operated using a fleet of marked Ford Capris, as well as unmarked Lotus Sunbeam cars, which were externally downgraded to appear as a regular Talbot Sunbeam. By the early 1990s, TASS had been replaced by the Tactical Vehicle Crime Unit (TVCU), operating a majority-unmarked high-performance fleet which included Ford Escort XR3i and Ford Sierra RS Cosworth cars. This unit notably featured in the 1995 fly on the wall six-part BBC documentary X-Cars, albeit referred to as 'X Department', which attracted 12 million viewers on the series' first airing and resulted in the TVCU receiving an overwhelmingly positive reaction from the public.

The TVCU was also featured in the 2006 BBC One series Car Wars, to similar public acclaim. It was renamed in the mid-2010s to the Tactical Vehicle Intercept Unit (TVIU), a name it keeps to this day.

=== Air Support Unit ===
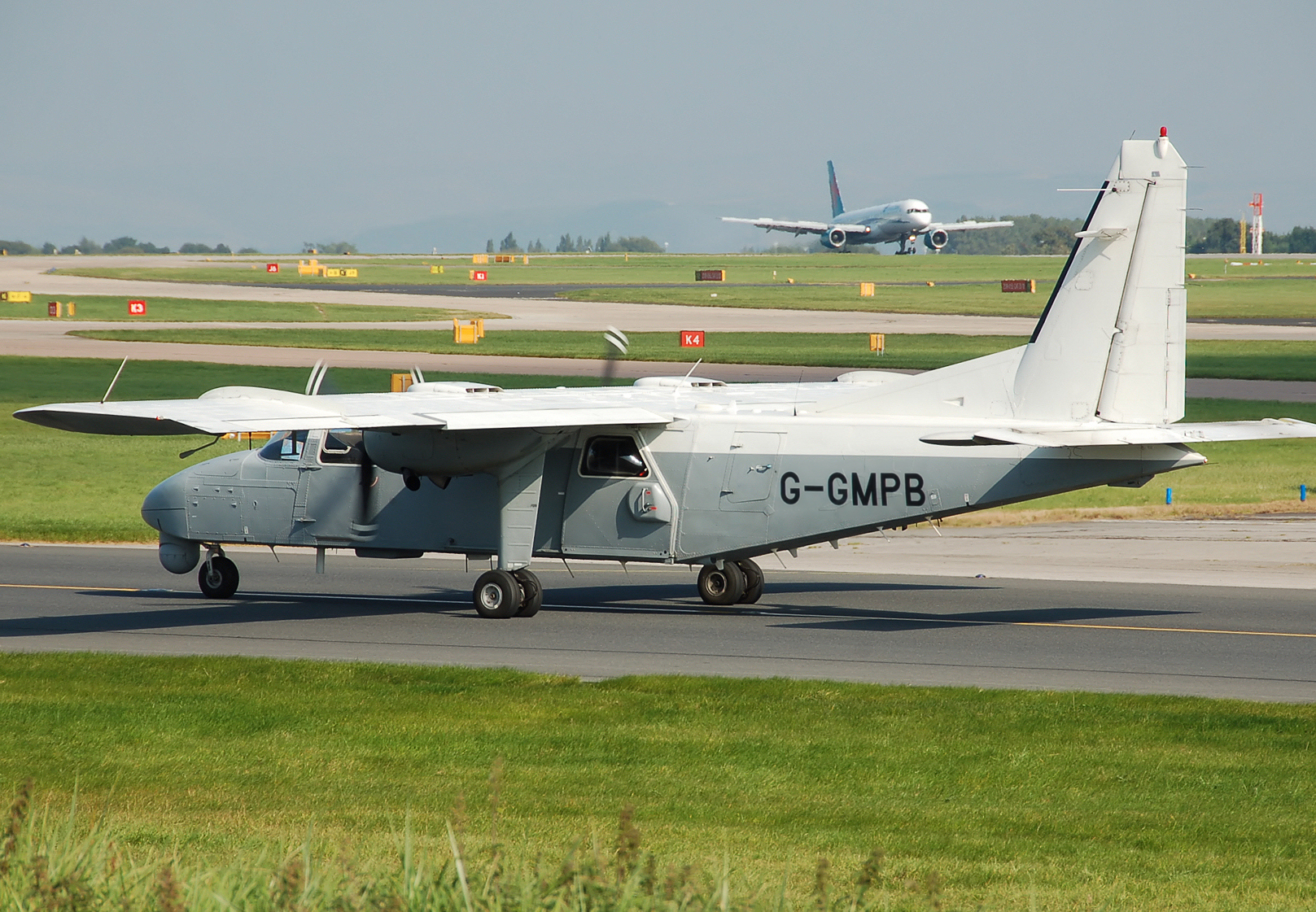
Former Britten-Norman Defender 4000 fixed wing aircraft in 2009

Aviation support has been provided to the GMP by the National Police Air Service (NPAS) since 2012. NPAS operates a EurocopterEC135 T2+ helicopter call sign NPAS 21 from Manchester Barton Aerodrome, which provides support to all neighbouring police forces.

GMP had formed an Air Support Unit in 1989. GMP's first helicopter was a Eurocopter AS355 Twin Squirrel. In c. 2001, the GMP was operating a McDonnell Douglas MD 902 Explorer helicopter call sign India 99 which remained in service until 2008. The MD 902 Explorer flew more than 8,000 hours dealing with around 5,500 incidents and was involved in the arrest of more than 700 criminals. In 2008, a new MD 902 Explorer entered service to replace the older helicopter.

Prior to the establishment of NPAS in 2012, the Air Support Unit had amalgamated with Cheshire Constabulary, North Wales Police and Lancashire Constabulary to form the North West Air Operations Group (NWAOG) in July 2011, operating four helicopters. The group was established to save money and provide flexibility with the closest helicopter able to be deployed to an incident and if there were two incidents in the same force area then two helicopters could be sent if necessary.

The Air Support Unit had also operated a fixed wing aircraft. In January 2002, GMP ordered a Britten-Norman Defender 4000 fixed wing aircraft for the Commonwealth Games in July. In July, GMP began operating the Defender call sign India 66 for the Games which flew on average seven hours a day. The Defender flew around 1,200 hours each year including targeting terrorists and major criminals. The Defender was decommissioned in December 2013. In the United Kingdom, two other police services have also operated the Defender 4000 – the Police Service of Northern Ireland and Hampshire Constabulary.

GMP also trialled a tethered blimp in 2010 to provide surveillance for major events and high crime locations. The blimp was only used on 18 occasions and was sold due to operational problems.

=== Tactical Aid Unit ===
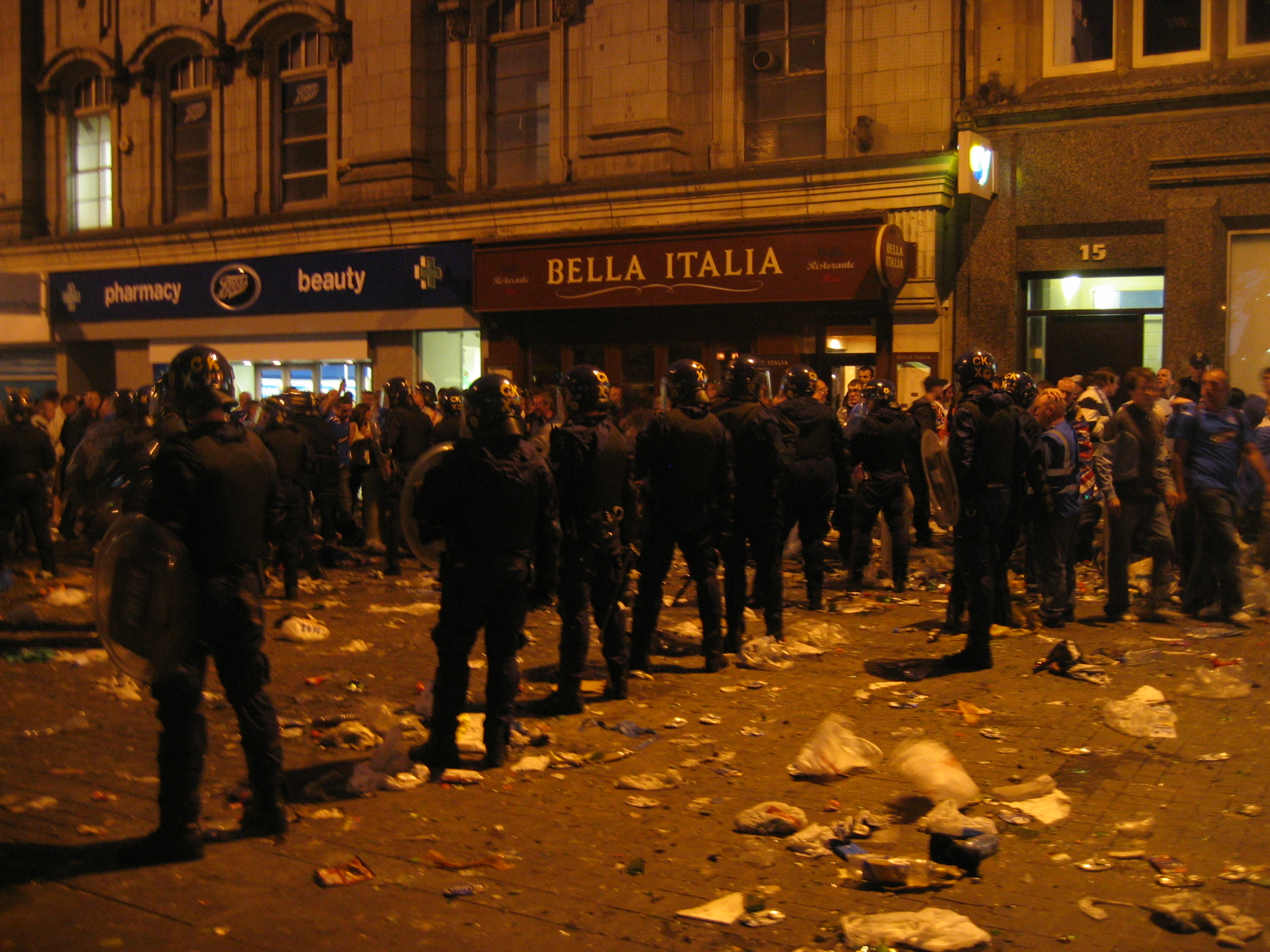
GMP Tactical Aid Unit in deployment during the 2008 UEFA Cup final riots

GMP operates a Tactical Aid Tactical aid unit which is deployed for crowd control and riot policing. The service has policed notable riots such as the 2001 Oldham race riots, the 2008 UEFA Cup final riots and the 2011 England riots which affected Salford and Manchester city centre in 2011.

A GMP Tactical Aid Unit vehicle in 2025

=== Serious Crime Division ===
The SCD is a unit of GMP responsible for dealing with serious crimes and providing protection for vulnerable people.

=== Counter-terrorism ===
The GMP Counter Terrorism Unit was formed in April 2007 to prevent the spread of terrorism. The city has experienced incidents with the intention to spread terror, such as the 1996 Manchester Bombing and the Manchester Arena bombing. Most recently, the unit helped thwart the 2009 plot to launch terror attacks on the Trafford Centre, Arndale Centre and nearby St Ann's Square.

=== Tactical Firearms Unit ===
Officers of the GMP, as in the rest of Great Britain, do not routinely carry firearms. Instead, the GMP maintains a firearms unit to provide them with a capability to deal with armed criminals. The Greater Manchester Police, Tactical Firearms Unit maintains Armed Response Vehicles, which transport armed officers to the scene.

=== Mounted Unit ===
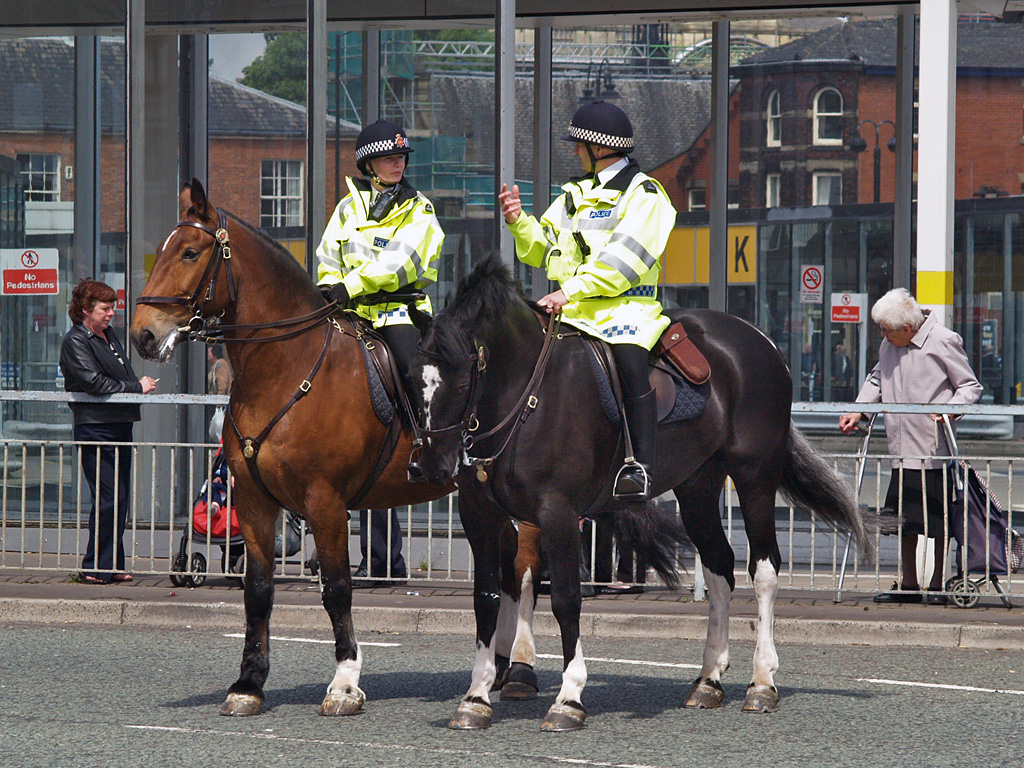
Mounted Greater Manchester Police in Bury

The GMP maintains a mounted policing capability. The mounted officers are employed to target crime hotspots and are also seen at many events including demonstrations and the region's football matches. Horses are also used to search inaccessible areas for missing or wanted people. The unit is made up of a team of specialist police officers, skilled grooms and trainers, and 35 horses. The mounted unit is based at Hough End, in Chorlton, and uses horseboxes to transport the horses for duties around Greater Manchester. All of the horses are named after characters from Charles Dickens's books.

=== Special constabulary ===
GMP has over 183 special constables, who are assigned to each of the twelve divisions. Special constables work alongside their regular counterparts and are mainly assigned to divisions and work within local policing teams (LPTs), however some divisions still allow officers to work within response teams when LPT's are not on duty. Between 2009 and 2012, a small number of special constables were integrated into the Special Operations Department (X – Depart) working within the Road Policing Units (RPU's), undertaking a full and complete duties within the traffic department.

In addition there are a number of special constables engaged, with support of their employers in the Employee Supported Policing scheme. This is where the officers employer supports the officers duties, usually with paid time, 8 hours per month are commonly covered to undertake their special constabulary duties at their normal place of work.

Special constables are normally coordinated by the chief officer of the special constabulary, currently Adam Kramer, and divisional commanders. Under the guidance of the chief constable, it was envisaged that the number of special constables within GMP would increase to 1,000 officers, within a three-year period from 2009, to date this target has not been achieved.

=== Video Intelligence Unit ===
This unit conducts overt surveillance of certain released prisoners and upload some footage onto YouTube of people that they believe have reoffended.

=== Major Incident Team ===
Greater Manchester Police has eight specialist Major Incident syndicates.

=== Transport Unit ===
The Transport Unit was created in November 2019. Its role involves proactively tackling crime and disorder across Greater Manchester's public transport system, including roads, buses, trams and interchanges. The unit consists of 56 police officers, replacing previous initiatives that saw PCSOs patrolling the transport network.

== Collaborations ==
The force is a partner in the North West Police Underwater Search & Marine Unit. It was also involved in the North West Motorway Police Group, until it was disbanded in April 2025.

== Rank structure ==
The rank structure that the Greater Manchester Police use is the same as all other British territorial police forces, excluding London.

=== Insignia ===
Great Britain police ranks and insignia
Rank	Chief constable	Deputy chief constable	Assistant chief constable	Chief superintendent	Superintendent	Chief inspector	Inspector	Sergeant	Constable
Epaulette insignia									

The Greater Manchester Police also have a special constabulary with five ranks.

Greater Manchester Police Special Constabulary Ranks
Rank	Special constable	Special sergeant	Special inspector	Special chief inspector	Special chief officer
Insignia					
Note	The Force uses collar numbers that start with "4" to identify special constables; Reference				

=== Workforce ===
These are the numbers of police officers for each rank:

Greater Manchester Police Workforce
Rank	Police staff	Police support volunteer	Designated Officer	PCSO	Special constable	Constable	Sergeant	Inspector	Chief inspector	Superintendent	Chief superintendent	Chief officer
Female personnel	2124	97	246	256	90	1642	268	66	33	16	3	1
Male personnel	1195	78	246	375	275	3375	746	235	73	30	11	6
Total personnel	3319	175	492	631	365	5017	1014	301	106	46	14	7
Reference	2019 Police workforce open data tables											

== Funding ==
In June 2017, less than a month after the Manchester Arena bombing, the Chief Constable of GMP, Ian Hopkins, said the force was under strain due to funding cuts. Mayor of Greater Manchester, Andy Burnham, intended to write to the Prime Minister claiming that the GMP was up to its limits "and probably beyond them". In March 2010 there was a total workforce of 13,189 staff, but projections suggested there would be only 10,108 by 2020. Her Majesty's Inspectorate of Constabulary (HMIC) maintained that the number of police officers would reduce by 1,800 over the next ten years. Burnham feared that pressure on the GMP was increasing due to terrorism and also because of a rise in violent crime in the region. Burnham told The Guardian, "There’s no question about it: GMP needs more officers. They are at their limits, probably beyond them, in terms of what they are dealing with. The chief constable has described it as the low end of reasonable. Therefore, that’s borderline unreasonable."

== PEEL inspection ==
His Majesty's Inspectorate of Constabulary and Fire & Rescue Services (HMICFRS) conducts a periodic police effectiveness, efficiency and legitimacy (PEEL) inspection of each police service's performance. In its latest PEEL inspection, Greater Manchester Police was rated as follows:

	Outstanding	Good	Adequate	Requires Improvement	Inadequate
PEEL 2021/22 rating			Recording data about crime	Preventing crime; Treatment of the public; Protecting vulnerable people; Managing offenders; Good use of resources	Investigating crime; Responding to the public; Developing a positive workplace

== GMP incidents and investigations ==
- The 1981 Moss Side riot began when 1,000 youths surrounded the police station in Moss Side, smashing all the windows and destroying 12 vehicles. It was followed by 48 hours of rioting.
- 1996 Manchester bombing. On 15 June 1996, the Irish Republican Army placed a 3,300 lb (1,500 kg) bomb in Manchester city centre on Corporation Street, the largest bomb in the United Kingdom since World War II. GMP officers, assisted by other emergency services, evacuated 80,000 people, from the first tip-off at approximately 10:00 a.m. until 11:16 a.m., when the bomb exploded. Hundreds were injured, many from shard of glass, but there were no fatalities. As of September 2022, no one has been charged.
- Gun crime in south Manchester, 1995–2009 – gun crime in south Manchester peaked in 1999 with 43 gun-related injuries and seven fatalities and continued until the early 2000s. Manchester went a year without a gun related fatality from February 2008 to 2009 for the first time in over a decade. This reduction is attributed to the jailing of 11 members of the Gooch Gang in 2009 and the service's Xcalibre unit, which tackles gang and gun-related crime and violence – deterring individuals from joining gangs and reducing the availability of firearms. As of 2012, gun crime in south Manchester is now rare.
- Harold Shipman, 1998 – Shipman was a doctor who murdered his patients. Shipman's proven victims totalled 218 making him the most prolific serial killer in history.
- In 2001, ethnic violence led to the Oldham riots, which saw 15 police officers injured and 32 police vehicles destroyed.
- Alleged racism – in 2003, video evidence emerged documenting racist acts by police trainees and officers, including one member applauding Hitler and another donning a Ku Klux Klan outfit. Flagrant use of racist language to deride other police trainees was also reported.
- Operation Augusta, from 2003 – following the death of a 15-year-old orphaned girl while in the care of Manchester social services, the police launched an operation which identified at least 57 children at risk of sexual abuse and up to 97 possible abusers, but which was prematurely closed down; a follow-up Operation Green Jacket, active in 2019, identified 53 potential victims.
- 2008 Union of European Football Associations (UEFA) Cup final riots (also known as the Battle of Piccadilly). The 2008 UEFA Cup final was on 14 May 2008. Some Rangers fans instigated scuffles and disorder before the match had started and when the video screen broke during the match, the disorder descended into riots.
- Summer 2011 England riots – the riots originally started in London on Saturday 6 August, and in response GMP sent 100 riot police officers on Tuesday 9 August. Riots with opportunist looting broke out in Manchester city centre on the evening of 9 August.
- Shooting of Anthony Grainger on 3 March 2012, an unarmed man was shot and killed by armed police during an operation. In 2017, a public inquiry was held. The report into Grainger's death concluded that Greater Manchester Police were to blame for his death due to their failures.
- Manchester Arena bombing, 22 May 2017 – an explosion occurred at the end of an Ariana Grande concert, killing 22 people, and injuring 59. GMP had a heavy police response, with many general duties officers and firearms officers descending on the scene.
- GMP placed into special measures, 18 December 2020 – Greater Manchester Police was placed into special measures following a 'damning inquiry has found one in five crimes were not recorded – and more than 80,000 hadn't been investigated properly'. Following the announcement, Chief Constable Ian Hopkins resigned.
- A 2022 independent review into child sexual exploitation in Greater Manchester found that child sex abuse victims were failed by Greater Manchester Police and the Oldham Council. Police had ignored some victims; for example, in October 2006 a twelve-year-old girl tried to report to the Oldham police station that she was sexually assaulted. She was told by the station to leave and only return if she was "not drunk". The girl was then raped in the car which took her from the station and then raped multiple times by five different men in a house. The review found that Shabir Ahmed, subsequently convicted as a ringleader of a British Pakistani grooming gang, had been employed by Oldham Council as a welfare rights officer and seconded to the Oldham Pakistani Community Centre. The review also found that "children had been failed by the agencies that were meant to protect them because child protection procedures had not been properly followed".
- In 2022, GMP searched the area of the Moors murders (1963–1965) without success in finding the body of the final victim, Keith Bennett.
- 2024 Manchester Airport brawl, 23 July 2024 – footage circulated online of an armed officer kicking and stamping on a suspect's head in Terminal 2 at Manchester Airport. GMP said in a statement afterward this was in response to a "violent assault" on three officers, who had been called over an alleged altercation. The officer has since been suspended and reported to the Independent Office for Police Conduct. The incident was followed by a protest outside Rochdale Police Station. The two suspects involved who attacked the police and bystanders were charged with assault in December 2024 by the CPS.
- In December 2025, GMP announced tougher enforcement of hate crime and protest-related public-order offences in a joint statement with London’s Metropolitan Police. Senior officers warned that placards and chants such as “intifada” and “globalise the intifada” – language used at pro-Palestinian demonstration, carried “real-world consequences” and said police would “act decisively and make arrests. The announcement followed heightened security concerns after an attack on a synagogue in Manchester that left two dead, and a mass shooting abroad in Sydney, Australia.

== See also ==
- Law enforcement in the United Kingdom
- List of law enforcement agencies in the United Kingdom, Crown Dependencies and British Overseas Territories
