= Simon Byrne (police officer) =

British police officer

Chief Constable Simon Byrne QPM
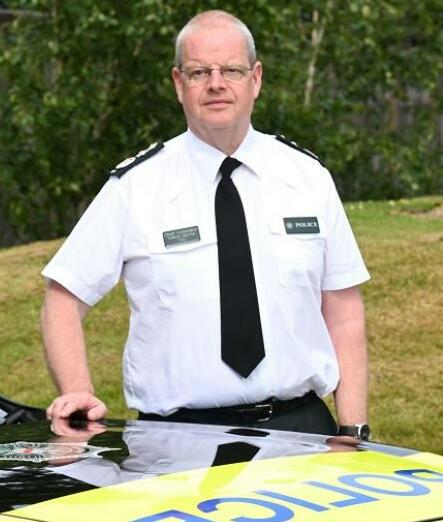
- Byrne in 2021

Chief Constable of the Police Service of Northern Ireland
- In office 1 July 2019 – 4 September 2023
- Deputy: Mark Hamilton
- Preceded by: Sir George Hamilton
- Succeeded by: Jon Boutcher

Personal details
- Born: 29 April 1963 (age 63) Epsom, Surrey, England
- Education: University of Manchester
- Profession: Police officer

Simon Byrne (born 29 April 1963) is an English former senior police officer. He served as chief constable of the Police Service of Northern Ireland (PSNI) from July 2019 until he resigned in September 2023. He was the deputy chief constable of Greater Manchester Police from 2009 to 2011 and the assistant commissioner for Territorial Policing in the Metropolitan Police Service from 2011 to 2014. He then served as chief constable of Cheshire Constabulary from 2014 to 2017.

== Early life and education ==
Byrne was born on 29 April 1963 in Epsom, Surrey, England. He was educated at Neston High School, then a comprehensive school in Neston, Cheshire. He later studied police management at the University of Manchester, graduating with a Master of Arts (MA) degree.

== Police career ==
Byrne began his career in the police when he joined the Metropolitan Police Service as a constable in 1982. He transferred to Merseyside Police in 1985. He served as the commander of the Metropolitan Borough of Knowsley between 2002 and 2004.

In 2006, he was promoted to assistant chief constable. As this is a chief officer rank, he joined the Association of Chief Police Officers. Within Merseyside Police he served as ACC Operations and ACC Personnel. In February 2009, he transferred to Greater Manchester Police, becoming deputy chief constable. In 2011, he returned to the Metropolitan Police Service as the assistant commissioner for Territorial Policing.

On 24 February 2014, he was selected as the next chief constable of Cheshire Constabulary. He took up the appointment on 25 June. From 2015 to 2017, he was additionally the National Police Chiefs' Council lead for criminal justice. He was awarded the Queen's Police Medal (QPM) in the 2016 New Year Honours. On 23 August 2017, he was suspended after an investigation found he had a case to answer for gross misconduct. His fixed-term contract expired in 2018. He was cleared of misconduct on 11 December 2018.

=== Police Service of Northern Ireland ===
On 24 May 2019, Byrne was announced as the next chief constable of the Police Service of Northern Ireland (PSNI). He took up the appointment on 1 July 2019. He was paid £207,489 per year. At a meeting of the Northern Ireland Policing Board on 6 April 2023, his contract as chief constable was extended by three years allowing his to continue in that role until 1 July 2027.

A LucidTalk poll in 2023 found that only 16% of people in Northern Ireland had confidence in his leadership of the PSNI, compared with 60% who expressed no confidence. This followed the PSNI data breaches in August 2023. Following an emergency meeting of the Northern Ireland Policing Board on 4 September 2023, Byrne resigned as chief constable.

== Personal life ==
In 1990, Byrne married Susan. Together they have three children, including one daughter who predeceased her parents.

== Honours ==

Ribbon	Description	Notes
	Queen's Police Medal (QPM)	2016 New Year Honours List; "For Distinguished Service"
	Queen Elizabeth II Golden Jubilee Medal	2002; UK version of this medal
	Queen Elizabeth II Diamond Jubilee Medal	2012; UK version of this medal
	Queen Elizabeth II Platinum Jubilee Medal	2022; UK version of this medal
	King Charles III Coronation Medal	2023; UK version of this medal
	Police Long Service and Good Conduct Medal	2005

Police appointments
Preceded by Ian McPherson	Assistant Commissioner (Territorial Policing); Metropolitan Police Service; 2011 to 2014	Succeeded by Helen King
Preceded by David Whatton	Chief Constable of Cheshire Constabulary; 2014 to 2017	Succeeded by Janette McCormick (acting)
Preceded by Sir George Hamilton	Chief Constable of the Police Service of Northern Ireland; 2019 to 2023	Succeeded by Jon Boutcher
