= Michael J. Todd =

British chief constable

Chief constable Michael J. Todd QPM
- Born: 10 August 1957; Barking, Essex, England
- Died: 11 March 2008 (aged 50); Bwlch Glas, Snowdon, Wales
- Occupation: Chief Constable
- Employer: Greater Manchester Police

Michael James Todd (10 August 1957 – 11 March 2008) was chief constable of Greater Manchester Police from October 2002 until his death.

== Early life and education ==
Todd grew up in Essex where he attended the Billericay School and later attended the University of Essex. He graduated with a first class honours degree in government in 1989 and a master's degree in politics in 1994. The university named him the alumnus of the year in 2003 for his contributions to policing and the community.

== Police career ==
Starting as a Police cadet Todd joined Essex Police in 1976.

After progressing through the ranks he attained the level of inspector via a management exchange programme with the Metropolitan Police.

In 1995 he was appointed assistant chief constable of Nottinghamshire Police, initially managing support services and then operational policing.

He returned to the Metropolitan Police in 1998 when appointed deputy assistant commissioner and in 2000 he was promoted to the rank of assistant commissioner. Throughout his tenure as assistant commissioner he was responsible for Territorial Policing covering all 32 London Boroughs. He oversaw the policing of several high profile public events, such as the Notting Hill Carnival, the Golden Jubilee celebrations and the anti-capitalist May Day protests, for which he received a Commissioner's Commendation from then Commissioner John Stevens.

In 2002, he was selected as chief constable of Greater Manchester Police, overseeing a city then notable for its extensive gang-related gun crime and a force with a record of poor performance, inefficiency and mired in claims of institutional racism. By the time of his death he was viewed as instrumental in improving performance, helping to dispel Manchester's "Gunchester" image and restoring his forces's reputation within the local community.

In 2006 he became a vice-president of the Association of Chief Police Officers (ACPO), a post he held until his death.

=== Investigation of CIA extraordinary rendition flights ===
On behalf of ACPO, Todd investigated the extraordinary rendition flights conducted by the CIA to transport detainees.

=== Taser demonstration ===
Todd was a proponent of the use of the taser and advocated for the weapon to be more widely issued to front line police officers. In 2005, in order to demonstrate that the stun guns were safe and effective, he allowed himself to be tasered on camera. After recovering he said "I was completely incapacitated, and if I was carrying a weapon there was no way I could have done anything, as I just couldn't move. And yes, it hurt like hell and no, I wouldn't want to do it again."

== Personal life ==
Todd was married for more than 27 years and had three children: a daughter and twin boys.

His social interests included mountain biking, computer gaming and reading, particularly military and political biographies.

=== Death ===
After Todd was reported missing by Greater Manchester Police, rescue teams from Llanberis, North Wales started a search for him at 01:00 on 11 March 2008. After being alerted by hill walkers who found personal possessions, they found Todd's body in the Bwlch Glas area of Snowdon. The post-mortem report initially found "no obvious cause" of death.

The inquest into his death was opened and adjourned on 13 March 2008.

One month after his death a public memorial service was held for Todd at Manchester Cathedral. The service was relayed live on the BBC Big Screen Manchester and to the GMP Police training centre, Sedgley Park.

On 6 October 2008, the coroner ruled that Todd had died from exposure, essentially freezing to death having been only lightly clothed on the slopes of Snowdon, and while "his state of mind was affected by alcohol, a drug and confusion due to his personal situation".

=== Post-death enquiry ===
Following Todd's death several allegations were made about both his personal and professional conduct. An enquiry undertaken by Paul Scott-Lee, then chief constable of West Midlands Police, found that while his lifestyle damaged the reputation of the police service it did not compromise the discharging of his duties as chief constable. He was also cleared of any inappropriate professional misconduct such as that relating to expenses, promotions and misuse of police equipment.

== Honours ==

Ribbon	Description	Notes
	Queen's Police Medal (QPM)	2001
	Queen Elizabeth II Golden Jubilee Medal	2002; UK version of this medal
	Police Long Service and Good Conduct Medal	

Police appointments
Preceded by First incumbent	Metropolitan Police Service; Assistant Commissioner (Policy, Review and Standards); 2000–2001	Succeeded by Tarique Ghaffur
Preceded by Ian Johnston	Metropolitan Police Service; Assistant Commissioner (Territorial Policing); 2001–2003	Succeeded by Tim Godwin
Preceded by David Wilmot	Chief Constable of Greater Manchester Police; 2002–2008	Succeeded by Peter Fahy
