= Cheshire Constabulary =

English police force

- Motto: Be safe, feel safe

Agency overview
- Formed: 20 April 1857; 169 years ago
- Employees: 2,088 police officers; 168 PCSOs
- Annual budget: £169.8 million (2018–19)

Jurisdictional structure
- Operations jurisdiction: Cheshire, England
- Map of police area
- Area: 905 square miles (2,340 km^{2})
- Population: 1.1 million
- Legal jurisdiction: England and Wales
- Governing body: Cheshire Police and Crime Commissioner
- Constituting instrument: Police Act 1996
- General nature: Local civilian police

Operational structure
- Overseen by: His Majesty's Inspectorate of Constabulary and Fire & Rescue Services; Independent Office for Police Conduct
- Headquarters: Clemonds Hey, Winsford
- Constables: 2,369 (of which 281 are Special Constables)
- Police Community Support Officers: 168
- Police and Crime Commissioner responsible: Dan Price
- Agency executive: Mark Roberts, Chief constable
- Local Policing Units: 9

Facilities
- Stations: 22

Website
- www.cheshire.police.uk

Cheshire Constabulary is the territorial police force responsible for policing the ceremonial county of Cheshire in North West England. The force is responsible for policing an area of 946 square miles (2,450 km^{2}) with a population of approximately 1 million people.

Chief Constable Mark Roberts was appointed in 2021. The deputy chief constable is Mike Evans, appointed in June 2025.

== History ==
Cheshire Constables Act 1829
- Act of Parliament
- Parliament of the United Kingdom
- Long title: An Act to enable the Magistrates of the County Palatine of Chester to appoint Special High Constables for the several Hundreds or Divisions, and Assistant Petty Constables for the several Townships of that County.
- Citation: 10 Geo. 4. c. xcvii

Dates
- Royal assent: 1 June 1829
Other legislation
Repealed by	Cheshire Constabulary Act 1852

Status: Repealed

Text of statute as originally enacted

Cheshire Constabulary Act 1852
- Act of Parliament
- Parliament of the United Kingdom
- Long title: An Act to amend an Act passed in the Tenth Tear of the Reign of His Majesty King George the Fourth, intituled "An Act to enable the Magistrates of the County Palatine of Chester to appoint Special High Constables for the several Hundreds or Divisions, and Assistant Petty Constables for the several Townships of that County."
- Citation: 15 & 16 Vict. c. xxxi

Dates
- Royal assent: 28 May 1852
Other legislation
Repeals/revokes	Cheshire Constables Act 1829
Repealed by	Cheshire County Council Act 1980

Status: Repealed

Text of statute as originally enacted

A constabulary was first formed in the county under the Cheshire Constables Act 1829 (10 Geo. 4. xcvii) which was amended by the Cheshire Constabulary Act 1852 (15 & 16 Vict. c. xxxi). The passage of the County and Borough Police Act 1856 (19 & 20 Vict. c. 69) led to the dissolution of this force and the creation of a second constabulary. Many of the officers continued to serve in the new force and there were clauses in the act which allowed their pension rights to continue.

The first chief constable was Captain Thomas Johnnes Smith, late of the Bedfordshire Militia. The first full Cheshire Police Committee met at the Crewe Arms Hotel, Crewe, on 3 February 1857 and the new Cheshire Constabulary was officially formed on 20 April 1857.

The first headquarters was established at 4 Seller Street, Chester. In 1862 this office was removed to 1 Egerton Street, Chester and remained there until 1870, when it was removed to 113 Foregate Street. In 1893, the Court of Quarter Sessions approved the building of a new headquarters which was erected at 142 Foregate Street and designed by John Douglas, at a cost not exceeding £2,000. This continued to be used, together with the adjoining buildings, until 1967, when a new purpose-built headquarters was opened at Nuns Road, Chester. This building served the constabulary until 2004 when the headquarters building moved to a purpose-built complex at Clemonds Hey, Winsford. In 1965, the force had an establishment of 1,359 and an actual strength of 1,329.

It was proposed by the Home Secretary on 6 February 2006, that Cheshire should merge with the Merseyside Police, to form a strategic police force, but these proposals were later abandoned.

The Museum of Policing in Cheshire preserves and researches the heritage of policing in the county.

In June 2022, Cheshire Police announced that they will start using facial recognition technology in a bid to help identify offenders. The Technology will be used retrospectively to compare images such as CCTV against pictures held on the police national database.

== Governance ==
The incumbent Cheshire Police and Crime Commissioner (PCC) is Dan Price, appointed in May 2024. The PCC is scrutinised by the Cheshire Police and Crime Panel, made up of elected councillors from the local authorities in the police area. Before November 2012, the force was governed by the Cheshire Police Authority.

=== Chief constables ===
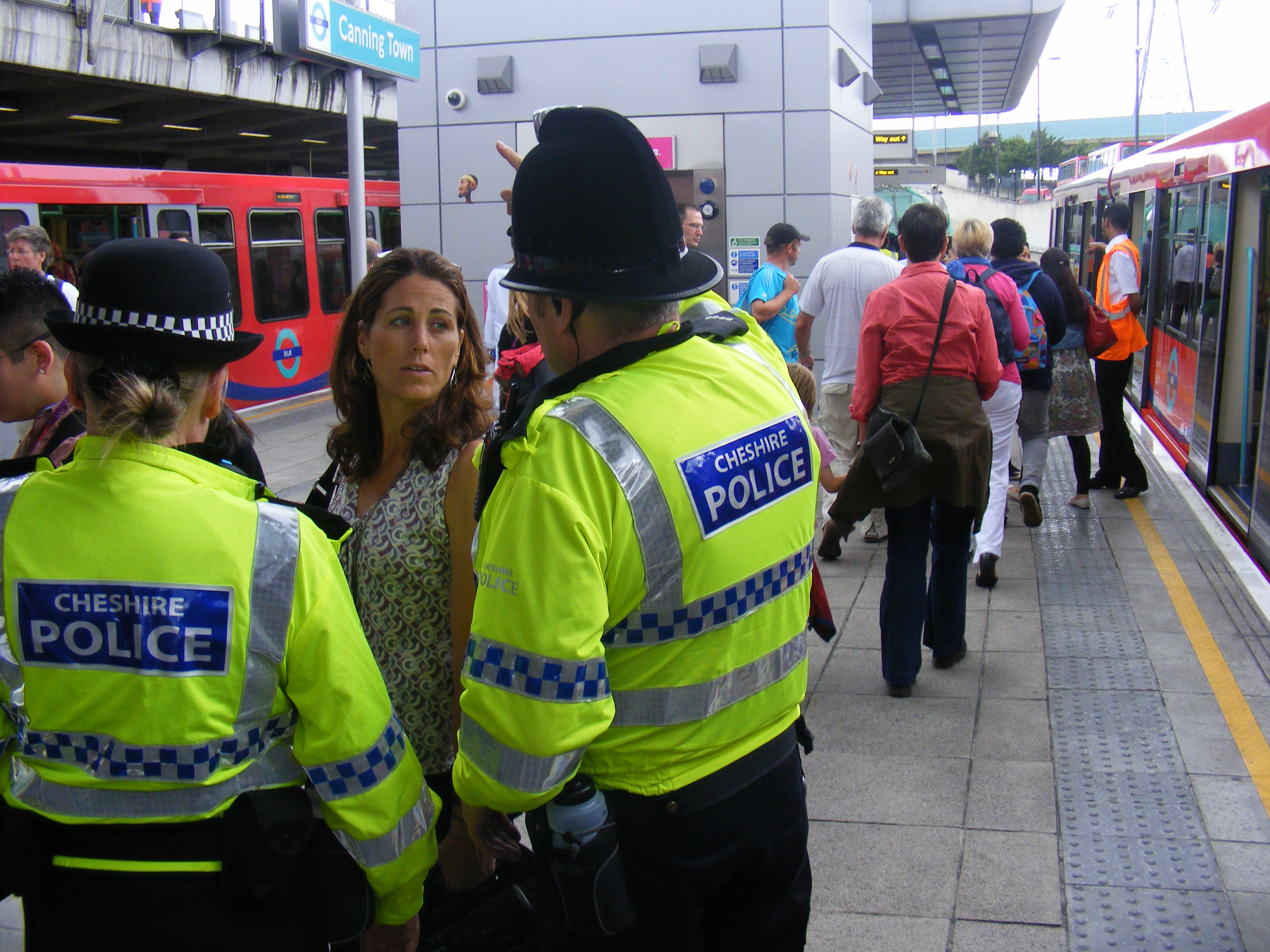
Cheshire Police officers on the DLR helping to police the London Olympic Games

The force has had a number of chief constables:

- Captain Thomas Johnes Smith (1857 to 1870) (First Chief Constable of Cheshire)
- Captain John William Arrowsmith (1870 to 1881)
- Colonel John Henry Hamersley (1881–1910)
- Lieutenant Colonel Pulteney Malcolm (1910 to 1934)
- Captain Archibald Frederick Hordern (1934 to 1935) (Chief Constable of Lancashire, 1935–50)
- Major Sir Jack Becke (1935 to 1946) (knighted in 1944 Birthday Honours)
- Godwin Edward Banwell (1946 to 1963)
- Henry Watson (1963 to 1974)
- William Kelsall (1974 to 1977)
- George Edward Fenn (1977 to 1984)
- David J. Graham (1984 to 1993)
- J. Mervyn Jones (1993 to 1997)
- Nigel K. Burgess (1997 to 2002)
- Sir Peter Fahy (2002 to 2008)
- David Whatton (2008 to 2014)
- Simon Byrne (2014 to 2017)
- Janette McCormick (acting; 2017 to 2019)
- Darren Martland (2019 to 2021)
- Mark Roberts (2021 to present)

=== Officers killed in the line of duty ===
The Police Roll of Honour Trust and Police Memorial Trust list and commemorate all British police officers killed in the line of duty. Since its establishment in 1984, the Police Memorial Trust has erected 50 memorials nationally to some of those officers.

Since 1788, the following officers of Cheshire Constabulary, or its predecessor organisations, were killed while attempting to prevent, stop or resolve a crime:

- Officer John Parry, 1788 (killed arresting a suspect on warrant).
- Police Constable Charles Alfred Cartledge, 1894 (fatally injured stopping a disturbance).
- Police Constable Alfred Kerns, 1900 (fatally injured during a struggle with two men).

== Organisation ==
The constabulary covers the council areas of Cheshire East, Cheshire West and Chester, Halton, and Warrington. In 2015, the structure of the force was changed to cover 3 Areas of the county consisting of 9 Local Policing Units (LPUs) across the county (towns & larger villages covered by each LPU in brackets)

West

- Chester (Frodsham, Helsby & Malpas)
- Northwich (Winsford & Tarporley)
- Ellesmere Port (Neston)

East

- Crewe (Nantwich & Audlem)
- Macclesfield (Alderley Edge, Wilmslow, Knutsford, Poynton & Bollington)
- Congleton (Sandbach, Middlewich, Holmes Chapel & Alsager)

North

- Runcorn
- Warrington (Lymm & Culcheth)
- Widnes

=== Basic command unit structure ===
Each area has several specialist teams, namely:

- Local Policing Units, each with local neighbourhood policing teams and investigation teams. The units concentrate on responding to both emergency and non-emergency calls, preventing and detecting local crime and targeting offenders, building contacts in the local community, resolving problems by working with local organisations and individuals, and being visible and accessible.
- Criminal Investigation Departments detect serious crime
- Customer Service Desks ensure incidents are dealt with promptly and the public get a better service
- Public Protection Units deal with domestic abuse, stalking and harassment, honour-based violence, elder abuse and child protection.
- Intelligence Units and Pro-active Policing Units target persistent criminals
- Partnership Development Units
- Custody Investigation Teams, consist of a combination of interviewing police officers and civilian staff members who interview persons detained in the custody suite suspected of committing an offence.

=== Headquarters-based teams ===
The following centralised teams operate from force headquarters:

- Central Roads Policing Unit
- Centralised Crime Recording Bureau
- Contingency Planning/Events Coordinators
- Force Major Investigation Team
- Specialised Support Units

=== Road policing ===
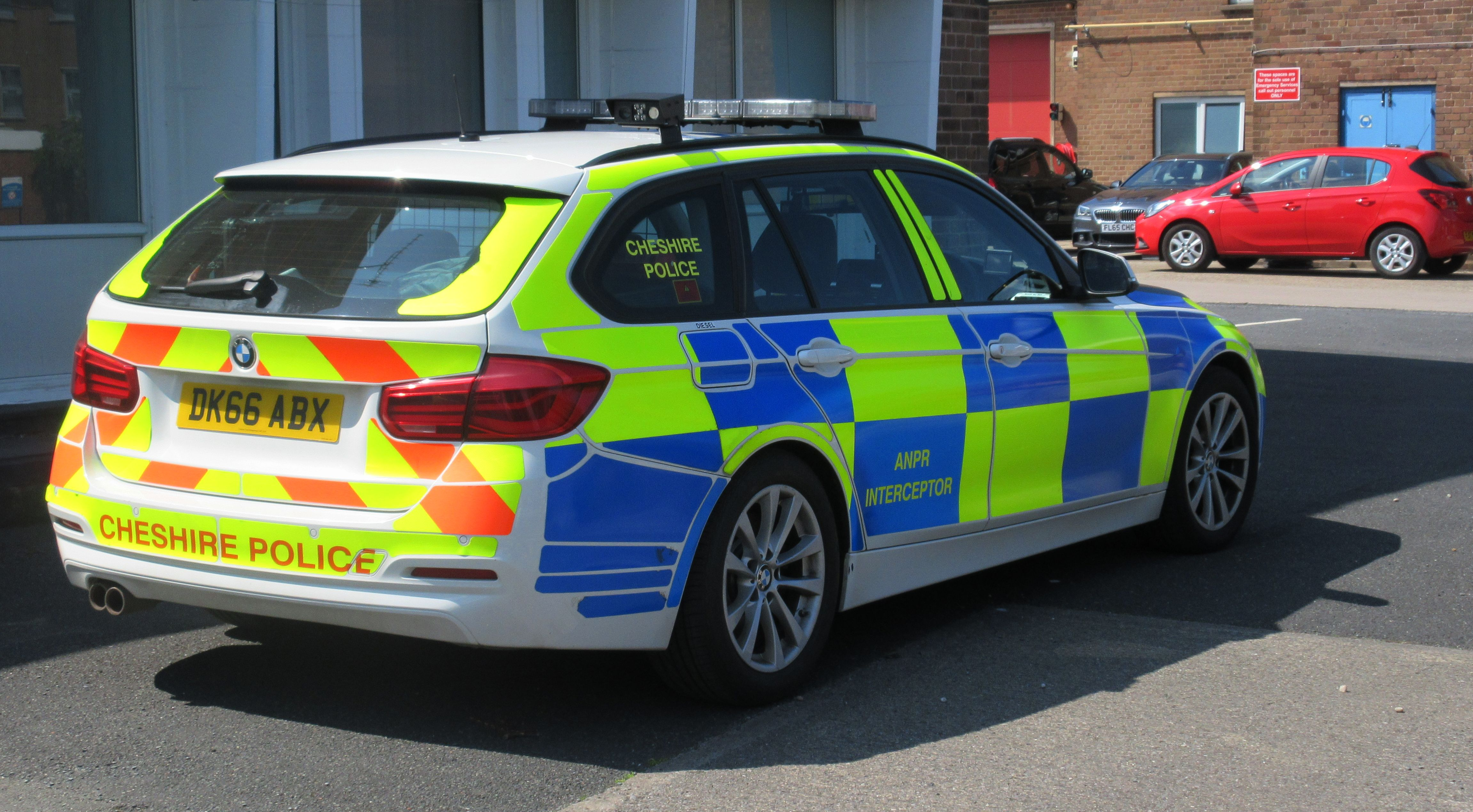
An ANPR traffic car pictured in 2020

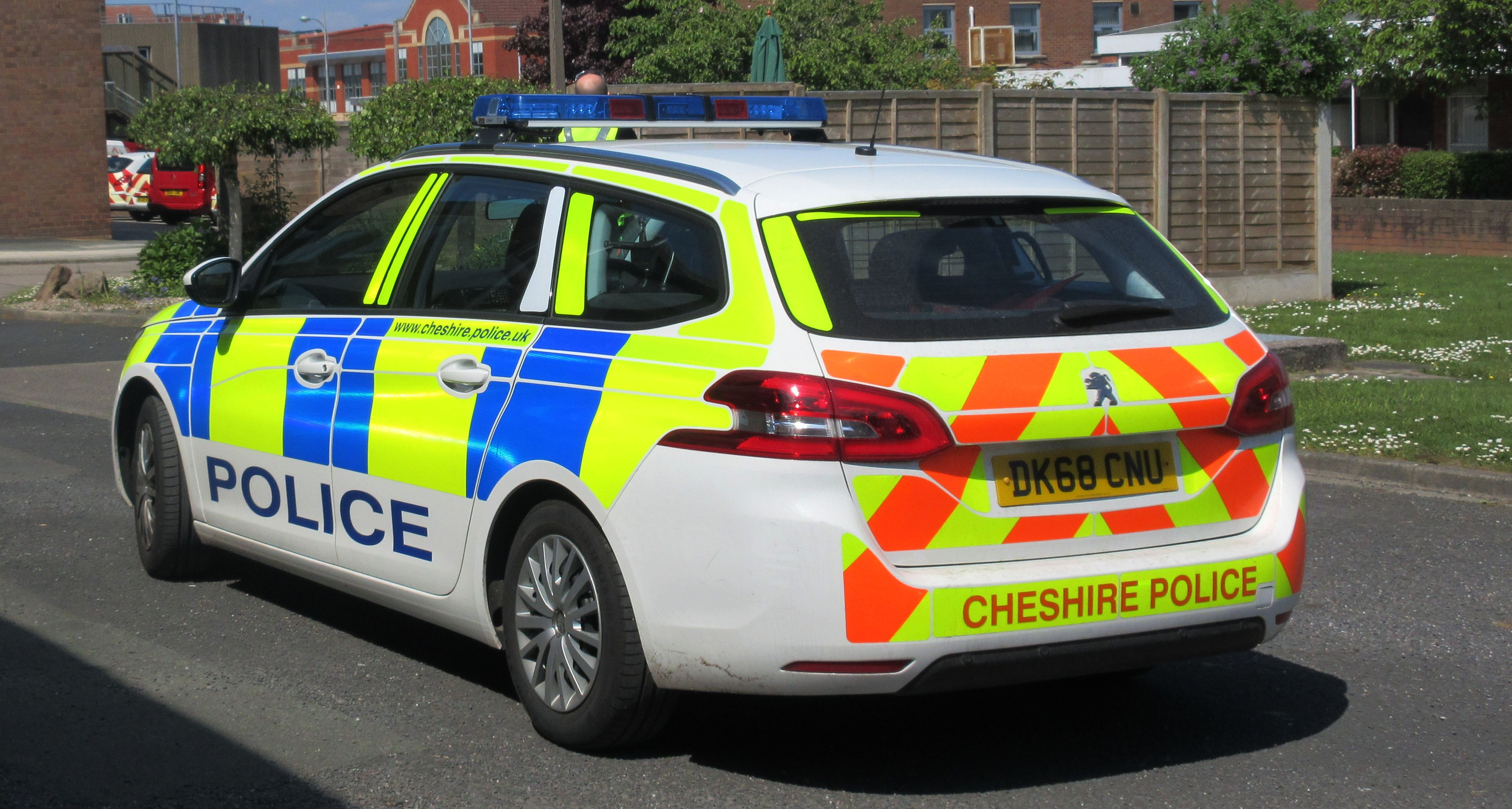
Peugeot 308 beat car pictured in 2020

The Cheshire road system is made up of 3,417 miles (5,499 km) of highway. The constabulary is responsible for policing one of the longest stretches of motorway in Britain. The force patrols 214 miles (344 km) of the M6, M62, M53 and M56 motorways, which has 23 interchanges and four service areas. The M6 motorway across the Thelwall Viaduct carries 140,000 vehicles every 24 hours. Delays and incidents on the motorway can have a severe impact on the economic life of the entire North West Region.

=== Air operations unit ===
The force no longer has an air operations unit. Since 2012 aviation support has been provided by the National Police Air Service.

Historically, in December 2001, Cheshire Police began operating a Britten-Norman Islander fixed-wing aircraft. It was particularly suited to police aviation as it was able to carry a wide range of equipment and stay airborne for long periods of time. This equipment allowed it to operate during the day or night, in most weather conditions.

On 27 February 2009, the Constabulary confirmed that the Home Office had agreed to jointly fund the purchase of a new £1 million Eurocopter EC135 aircraft, to be operational 24 hours a day. The fixed-wing aircraft was retired when the new helicopter came into operation.

The aircraft was operated by a team of civilian pilots, four police observers and one sergeant ensure it was available all year. The aircraft was used to conduct a wide range of policing work providing emergency responses to incidents involving threat to life, commission of crime and searching for missing persons. It also conducted deployments for non-crime searches, scene management at incidents and video evidence gathering.

On 18 July 2011, the North West Air Operations Group was launched. It was a regional collaboration between five forces and police authorities. The service dispatched aircraft from a regional command desk to incidents across Cheshire, Greater Manchester, Lancashire, Merseyside and North Wales. The five forces in the North had four helicopters, based at four different locations throughout the North West, providing a service anywhere in the region, 24 hours a day, seven days a week.

== Race and sex discrimination in recruitment ==
In February 2019, Cheshire Constabulary was found guilty of discrimination, having refused to give an applicant a job because he was a white heterosexual man. Despite the applicant, university graduate Matthew Furlong, being judged to have been "well prepared", he was nevertheless rejected for the job with the force falsely claiming that 127 of the other candidates had been equally suitable for the role, a claim an employment tribunal described as a "fallacy". The tribunal was told that Acting Chief Constable Janette McCormick believed "passionately about positive action" and it ruled that Furlong had been a victim of direct discrimination on the grounds of his sexual orientation, with the case believed to be the first in the UK of an organisation misusing positive action to discriminate illegally.

== Collaborations ==
Cheshire Constabulary is a partner in the following collaborations:

- Alliance Armed Policing Unit (Cheshire and North Wales)
- North West Police Underwater Search & Marine Unit
- Safer Schools & Young People's Partnerships

The force was also involved in the North West Motorway Police Group, until it was disbanded in April 2025.

== Crime statistics ==
Between 2024 and 2025, Cheshire Constabulary's crime statistics for recorded crimes were:

	2024 – 2025
Burglary	2,629
Criminal Damage	5,809
Drug Offences	3,328
Other Offences	2,180
Possession / Weapons	739
Public Order	8,965
Robbery	431
Sexual Offences	4,169
Theft / Stolen Goods	12,472
Vehicle Offences	2,178
Violence / Person	35,513
Grand Total	78,413

== PEEL inspection ==
His Majesty's Inspectorate of Constabulary and Fire & Rescue Services (HMICFRS) conducts a periodic police effectiveness, efficiency and legitimacy (PEEL) inspection of each police service's performance. In its latest PEEL inspection, Cheshire Constabulary was rated as follows:

	Outstanding	Good	Adequate	Requires Improvement	Inadequate
2021/22 rating		Preventing crime; Treatment of the public; Developing a positive workplace	Investigating crime; Protecting vulnerable people; Good use of resources; Recording data about crime	Responding to the public; Managing offenders	

== Cheshire Constabulary and the media ==
During 2005/06, the force was featured in the BBC TV series Traffic Cops.

Former Chief Constable Sir Peter Fahy called for the legal age of buying alcohol to increase to the age of 21 as a result of the Garry Newlove murder in 2007.

Series 3 of 999: What's Your Emergency?, which aired in mid 2016, followed officers from Cheshire Constabulary alongside Ambulance crews from the North West Ambulance Service.

During 2017, Cheshire Constabulary was featured in series 12 of Channel 5's TV programme Police Interceptors.

In early 2019, a ten-part series focusing on the work of Cheshire Police's Vehicle Maintenance Unit aired on the TV channel Dave.

In 2021 a new spin off of the show Motorway cops started following the roads and crime team in the series Motorway Cops:Catching Britain's speeders again for a Channel 5's commission.

== Arms ==
Coat of arms of Cheshire Constabulary
Notes Granted 10 December 1965 Crest On a wreath Or and Azure, within two sprays of oak a crown palisado Or, issuant therefrom a wolf's head Argent. Escutcheon Azure, between two garbs in fess a sword erect supported in chief by two lions passant guardant issuant from the flanks, all Or. Motto 'Tutior Quo Paratior'

== See also ==
- List of law enforcement agencies in the United Kingdom, Crown Dependencies and British Overseas Territories
- Law enforcement in the United Kingdom
