= Shaun Sawyer =

Police officer; Chief Constable of Devon and Cornwall Police

Chief constable Shaun Sawyer QPM

Chief Constable of Devon and Cornwall Police
- In office February 2013 – September 2022
- Monarch: Elizabeth II
- Deputy: Jim Colwell
- Preceded by: Stephen Otter
- Succeeded by: Will Kerr

Temporary chief constable of Devon and Cornwall Police
- In office March 2012 – February 2013

Deputy chief constable of Devon and Cornwall Police
- In office April 2010 – March 2012

Commander, Counter Terrorism Command
- In office April 2008 – March 2010

Personal details
- Born: Shaun Pannell Hooley, Surrey, England
- Domestic partner: Catherine Mead OBE DL
- Children: 3
- Education: University of Exeter (Hon. LLB); University of Cambridge (Dip. Crim); University of Leicester (BA Hons)
- Occupation: Police officer
- Home Secretaries served under: Jacqui Smith, Alan Johnson, Theresa May, Amber Rudd, Sajid Javid, Priti Patel

Shaun Sawyer (born 5 January 1963) is a former chief constable and senior detective. As chief constable of Devon and Cornwall Police from 2013 to 2022, his National Police Chiefs' Council (NPCC) responsibilities included national police performance improvement, combatting organised immigration crime and modern slavery, and involved engagement with parliamentarians, home secretaries, ministers and senior Home Office officials.

== Early life and education ==
Sawyer was born in London, the youngest of three boys living in a council property. Following a disrupted education, he credits Norman Hoare, his history teacher at Vandyke Upper School, as an instrumental role model. Sawyer earned a BA (Hons) in Combined Arts (History, Ancient History, and Archaeology) from the University of Leicester, and a Diploma in Criminology from Fitzwilliam College, Cambridge. In 2020, he was awarded an Honorary Doctorate from the University of Exeter for his work with academia, combating modern slavery.

== Policing career ==
=== Metropolitan Police Service ===
Sawyer joined the Metropolitan Police Service in 1986, serving community policing across areas including Paddington, Marylebone and Wandsworth. Early in his career, he was involved in major public order incidents, notably the Poll Tax Riots, which involved around 200,000 protesters.

Sawyer joined the staff office of Assistant Commissioner (ACSO) David Veness in 1996. Following the London Docklands, Hammersmith Bridge and Manchester bombings, Sawyer headed ACSO Security and Protection Secretariat, a national strategic and operational co-ordination unit working with British Intelligence Agencies until 1999, a period covering the Good Friday agreement.

==== Major investigations ====
Sawyer led the body recovery, identification and family liaison response to the 1999 Ladbroke Grove Rail Disaster, which had resulted in 31 fatalities and 417 injuries, one of the UK’s worst rail accidents. He formed a strong working partnership with the British Transport Police Senior Investigating Officer Nick Bracken. Sawyer provided evidence at the subsequent Lord Cullen inquiry.

Sawyer managed high-profile homicide investigations, notably working alongside Hamish Campbell the senior investigator for the murder of Jill Dando. He later discussed this case extensively in the BBC documentary The Murder of Jill Dando (2019).

Sawyer worked with Diana and Paul Lamplugh to regain their trust in policing, during the reopened investigation into the disappearance of Suzy Lamplugh. He publicly appealed on BBC One Crimewatch, emphasising the need to "bring this inquiry to a conclusion for the sake of Suzy’s family".

==== Anti-corruption, counter-terrorism and gang violence ====
From 2001, Sawyer headed the New Scotland Yard Anti-Corruption Command including oversight of the covert stages of the revisited Daniel Morgan inquiry, known as Operation Ethiopia and one of the largest anti-corruption investigations in UK police history. Sawyer made recommendations within ACPO Professional Standards working group to improve standards and mechanisms to remove corrupt and discreditable officers.

From 2005, Sawyer headed New Scotland Yard Intelligence and Covert Policing, working with EUROPOL, INTERPOL and UK Intelligence agencies, overseeing covert operations.

From 2007, Sawyer headed the MPS Violent Crime Directorate, reporting to then Home Secretary Jacqui Smith's Tackling Gun and Gang Crime Taskforce. Sawyer was amongst the first to advocate community-focused intelligence and child-centered preventative strategies, with academic, evidence based and approaches to preventing inter-generational gang crime.

From 2008, Sawyer led the newly formed New Scotland Yard Counter Terrorism Command, including working with Middle East states and supporting the Home Office, to enhance the UK’s approach to the PREVENT strategy. Sawyer was duty officer responsible for national incidents, including the 2008 Mumbai attacks and attempted Exeter suicide bombing.

In 2010, Sawyer was appointed deputy chief constable of Devon and Cornwall Police. He worked with Stephen Otter to transform force crime performance, achieving the highest levels of public confidence, police detections and amongst the lowest reported crime, independently measured by the Office of National Statistics.

== Chief constable of Devon and Cornwall Police (2012–2022) ==
Sawyer was appointed chief constable (temporary) in 2012 and substantively in 2013 by the Police and Crime Commissioner Tony Hogg following the implementation of the Police Reform and Social Responsibility Act.

Sawyer and Hogg were progressive in modernising and re-setting the policing landscape during austerity, working effectively with Staff Associations and Trades Unions, reducing headcount by 1,000 posts. Sawyer embraced police reform, working with Hogg in their respective roles ensuring transparent accountability of policing, delivering sustained public service within budget.

Sawyer was innovative, taking evidence-based approaches and whole system design to focus on services rather than basic cost cutting. Sawyer managed the complexities of transformative and transactional change with his executive team, undertaking Institute of Directors training, engaged with private industry and recruited external executives.

Sawyer respected the independence, integrity and leadership of Tom Winsor, His Majesty's Inspectorate of Constabulary and Fire & Rescue Services. He wrote though of his private concerns that the operational level within the inspectorate were slow to comprehend the speed of change and societal impact of austerity, with operational impact on public services, especially the NHS and mental health services.

Working with Dorset Police Chief Constable Debbie Simpson and Dorset Police and Crime Commissioner Martyn Underhill, in 2015 Sawyer and Hogg formed the two-force ‘Strategic Alliance’ enabling procurement, operational and back-office capabilities in a sustainable legal framework.

Following the retirement of Hogg in 2016, Alison Hernandez was elected PCC. Sawyer and Hernandez formed an effective governance and working relationship, with Sawyer crediting Hernandez for her work across political parties combatting modern slavery.

Sawyer brokered with Hernandez and Dorset police, exploration of a voluntary merger. Working with the Home Office and HM Treasury's Green Book, it evidenced that merger was financially and operationally viable, including digital data systems. Despite three parties and independent advisors recommending merger, Hernandez declined to support it.

Sawyer chaired the 5 Force Chief Constable South-West region, investing in regional capability building. His force provided lead regional development and leadership of the Emergency Services Mobile Communication Services. Sawyer led and represented the south west on the National Police Air Service board.

In 2021, Sawyer led the policing operation for the G7 Summit in Carbis Bay, Cornwall, described by commentators as “British policing at its best.” He coordinated the deployment of 6,500 officers, the first to encompass officers from all forces within the UK and during the global COVID-19 pandemic, bringing added complexity. He was responsible for security arrangements involving 13 global leaders, including Queen Elizabeth II and US President Joe Biden during his first official visit to the UK.

Prior to the Summit, Sawyer asked Bernard Hogan-Howe for his assessment of security arrangements and credited him for his contribution to the success of G7. It is speculated this caused consternation with NPCC and Metropolitan Police leaders. His strategic and operational approach were adopted by Police Scotland for COP 26 Glasgow.

In 2020, Sawyer had told Hernandez of his intention to retire in 2021. He remained in post to lead the response to the Keyham/Plymouth shooting on August 12, 2021, until his retirement in August 2022.

=== National Police Chiefs’ Council (NPCC) ===
NPCC Chair Police Performance Management Co-ordination Committee 2020-22. Sawyer worked with then Minister for Crime, Policing and Justice Kit Malthouse, Home Office officials and Chief Constables building a new national performance system across police regions to deliver government crime objectives. Sawyer facilitated a revision of police performance data collation, quality improvement, analysis and sharing working with the Home Office, HMICFRS and College of Policing. He worked with Ministry of Justice officials improving prosecutions with a focus on combatting Violence Against Women and Girls.

NPCC Lead Modern Slavery, Human Trafficking 2012-22. Sawyer worked to Theresa May as Home Secretary and later Prime Minister, within the Anti-Slavery Taskforce. He improved national law enforcement intelligence capabilities, investigations, prosecutions and victim support working with successive Home Secretaries, Ministers, Home Office, Crown Prosecution Service and national stakeholders. He was Chair of National Crime Agency Modern Slavery Human Trafficking Threat Group. Sawyer worked with the All-Party Parliamentary Group, Private Sector, NGOs and gave evidence to the Home Affairs Select Committee Chair, Yvette Cooper. Sawyer also worked closely with key stakeholders including the Santa Marta Group, academia and through international conferences.

NPCC Lead Organised Immigration Crime 2012-22. Sawyer led across successive Home Secretary’s, Ministers and Home Office senior officials, including Mark Sedwill and Olly Robbins from the 2015 Migrant Crisis to the Small Boat Crisis. He took the senior police role within the National Crime Agency Organised Immigration Crime Threat Group. Sawyer spoke powerfully in response to the death in Essex of 39 Vietnamese migrants. Sawyer negotiated and brokered with Lynne Owens the Crime and Courts Tasking of Chief Constables demanding greater operational focus and collaboration to combat OIC.

NPCC Lead Volunteer Police Cadets 2013 - 2022. Sawyer worked with the Home Office following reported predatory behaviour towards cadets within some forces. Sawyer challenged attitudes approaches within the NPCC and some forces. He was integral to the NPCC adopting UK Safer Spaces Standards.

ACPO Lead Crime Training and Standards 2005 - 2015. Sawyer led the National Professionalising Investigative Procedures Review, incorporating Intelligence, Homicide Working Group and National Police Improvement Agency. He championed civilian investigators, professional accreditation and drove Authorised Professional Practice.

ACPO Lead Prisons Intelligence 2005 - 2008. Sawyer worked across law enforcement and criminal justice on national standards, covert tactics and concept of operations.

ACPO Professional Standards Working Group 2001 - 2004. Sawyer worked collaboratively making recommendations to improve proactive anti-corruption investigations, preventative strategies, standards and vetting.

== Education, qualifications and development ==
- 2024 Windsor Leadership Trust - Working Group
- 2022 Windsor Leadership Trust - Strategic Leaders Consultation
- 2017 Diploma - Chartered Institute of Directors
- 2014 Windsor Leadership Trust - Experienced Leaders Programme
- 2004 Diploma Criminology - Cambridge University
- 1984 BA (Hons) Combined Arts History, Ancient history, Archaeology - Leicester University

== Recognition ==
- 2022 Home Secretary Commendation - Outstanding contribution to Home Affairs
- 2021 Prime Minister Recognition - Policing G7
- 2019 Queens Police Medal - National services to policing
- 2019 Honorary Doctorate, Exeter University - Academic services, Modern Slavery

== Voluntary ==
- Windsor Leadership Trust - Visiting Chair and Speaker
- Expert Advisor - Independent Anti-Slavery Commissioner
- Trustee - Cornwall Community Foundation
- Trustee - UNSEEN

== Honours ==
Sawyer was awarded the Queen's Police Medal (QPM) in the 2019 New Years Honours List.

Ribbon	Description	Notes
	Queen's Police Medal (QPM)	For Distinguished Service; 2019 New Years Honours List
	Queen Elizabeth II Golden Jubilee Medal	2002; UK Version of this Medal
	Queen Elizabeth II Diamond Jubilee Medal	2012; UK Version of this Medal
	Queen Elizabeth II Platinum Jubilee Medal	2022; UK Version of this Medal
	Police Long Service and Good Conduct Medal	

Police appointments
Preceded by Stephen Otter	Chief Constable of Devon and Cornwall Police; 2013–2022	Succeeded by Will Kerr
