= Joseph Davidson =

Joseph Davidson may refer to:

- Joseph Davidson (cricketer) (1846–1901), English cricketer
- Joseph Davidson (rugby union) (1878–1910), English sportsman
- Joseph George Davidson (1892–1969), chemist
- Joe Davidson (American football) (born 1903)

== See also ==
- Joseph Davison (1868–1948), Northern Irish politician
- Joseph Davidson Qualtrough (1885–1960), Manx politician
- Joseph Davidson Sowerby (1863–1948), British constable
- Josephine Davison, New Zealand actress
