= Ali Dizaei =

London police officer

Ali Dizaei علی دیزایی
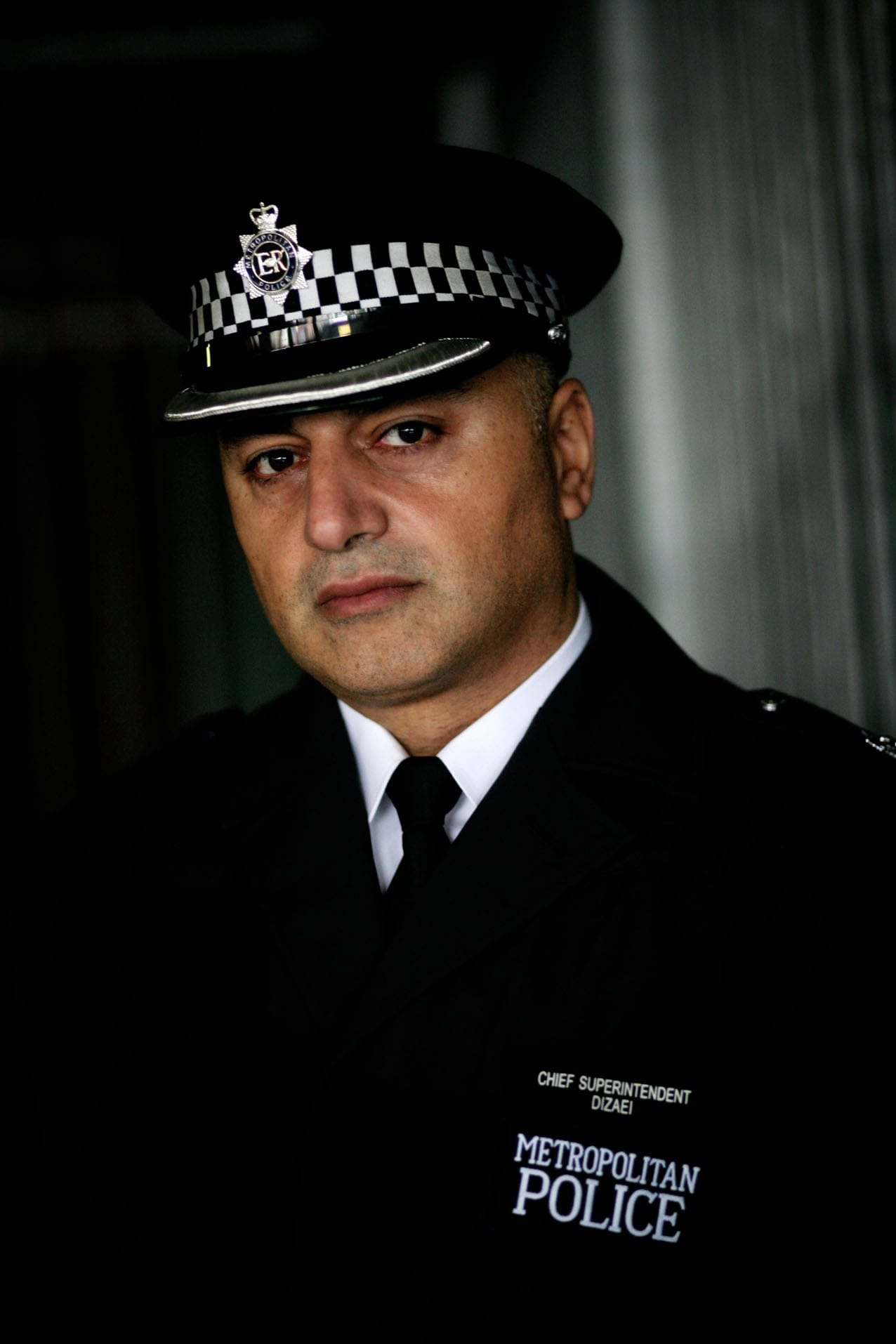
- Born: Jamshid Ali Dizaei; 1962 (age 63–64); Tehran, Pahlavi Iran
- Education: City University London; University of Cambridge; Brunel University
- Occupation: Former London Metropolitan Police officer
- Spouses: Natalie Downing (m. 1986; div. 2005) Shahameh (m. 2007)
- Children: 4 sons
- Status: Released
- Convictions: Misconduct in a public office; Attempting to pervert the course of justice; (13 February 2012)
- Criminal charges: Perverting the course of justice; Misconduct in a public office; Submitting false mileage expense claims
- Penalty: Three years imprisonment on each count; served concurrently.

Jamshid Ali Dizaei (Persian: جمشید علی دیزایی, transliteration: Jamshīd ʿAlī Dizaī; Persian pronunciation: [dizɒːjiː]) (born 1962) is a British-Iranian former police officer who was convicted of misconduct in a public office and perverting the course of justice in 2012. After starting his police career at Thames Valley Police in 1986, Dizaei joined the Metropolitan Police in 1999, rising through the ranks ultimately to the position of Commander in 2008.

== Early life and education ==
Dizaei was born in Tehran, Pahlavi Iran where his father was a deputy commissioner of police. He moved to the UK in 1973. He was educated at Slindon College, a private boarding school in Arundel, West Sussex. Dizaei studied law at university, gaining a BA (Hons) and LLM in Law from City University Londonand a diploma in policing from Cambridge University, later gaining a PhD from Brunel University.

== Police career ==
=== Early roles (1986-1999) ===
Dizaei joined Thames Valley Police in 1986. He served in Henley-on-Thames, in uniform and the Criminal Investigation Department, rising to the rank of Chief Inspector. He was appointed an adviser on race issues to the Home Secretary, and then transferred to the Metropolitan Police Service (MPS) on promotion to Superintendent on 29 March 1999 as a staff officer to Assistant Commissioner Ian Johnston.

On 17 May 1999, he was transferred to Kensington police station and, on 3 April 2000, became Superintendent of Operations there. He was already outspoken on race issues, first coming to media attention in November 1999 to criticize questions asked in promotion exams.

=== Operation HELIOS (2000) ===
In 2000, Dizaei was investigated by force after allegations of taking bribes, using drugs and prostitutes, and spying for Iran. In 2004, the Independent Police Complaints Commission (IPCC) described Operation Helios as having been "seriously flawed", and it was later described as a "total waste of taxpayers' money." Dizaei eventually faced a minor disciplinary action, having been cleared of all criminal charges. The MPS issued a public statement saying that Dizaei returned to work with his "integrity demonstrably intact".

In December 2006, it was public that during Operation Helios, the MPS had unlawfully tapped over 3,500 private calls made by Dizaei. The ruling was made by the Investigatory Powers Tribunal after referral by the NBPA.

In June 2007, Sir Ian Blair apologized for Operation Helios after the MPS and the NBPA agreed to resolve disputes arising out of Helios.

=== Racial discrimination claims (2003) ===
Dizaei brought his own claim for racial discrimination in the conduct of the investigations by the MPS. This was withdrawn after the MPS paid him £80,000 and reinstated him in October 2003.

=== Not One of Us book (2007) ===
In March 2007, Dizaei published Not One of Us, an account of his police career and the Operation Helios investigation. Before publication, the MPS issued a statement noting that it "considers it a matter of regret that Chief Superintendent Dizaei has felt it necessary to write this book", and reiterating its support for the Helios team. Upon release the book was serialised on BBC Radio 4 and in The Times.

In November 2007, Stephen Otter, then the Chief Constable of Devon and Cornwall, successfully sued Dizaei and the publishers of his book ″Not One of Us″ for libel. The libel action centered on claims by Dizaei in his book that Mr. Otter had given false evidence as a prosecution witness during proceedings against Mr. Dizaei at an Old Bailey trial for perverting the course of justice - which resulted in his acquittal. At a hearing in the High Court of Justice, Dizaei, his co-author and book publisher, admitted that "there was no basis to suggest that Mr. Otter was not telling the truth" at the trial, and formally apologised to Otter in court. In addition to the apology, Dizaei, his co-author and publisher agreed to make a substantial donation to a charity of Otter's choice and to pay his legal costs.

=== Senior appointments and later career (2004-2008) ===
Dizaei was promoted to Chief Superintendent in May 2004 and became Borough Commander of Hounslow and later Borough Commander of Hammersmith and Fulham. In 2006, he was in the headlines again for criticizing the Forest Gate raid and passenger profiling on aircraft. The Police Federation has accused him of "blissful ignorance" for the latter.

In March 2008, and at the third attempt, Dizaei was promoted to Commander.

In 2008, Dizaei commenced Employment Tribunal proceedings against Catherine Crawford (the Chief Executive of the Metropolitan Police Authority), Sir Paul Stephenson and others, claiming that they had specifically targeted him for being an outspoken critic of their record on race and for Dizaei supporting Assistant Commissioner Tarique Ghaffur in his race discrimination claim against Paul Stephenson and Ian Blair.

On 12 September 2008, the MPS announced that Dizaei was the subject of a complaint alleging that he had improperly advised solicitors defending a woman accused of a fatal hit-and-run accident. Dizaei claimed that this was a malicious complaint by Lord MacKenzie to further his business interests. MacKenzie was rebuked by the Black Rod for using the House of Lords letterhead to make his complaint against Dizaei.

=== Allegations of credit card misuse (2008) ===
In September 2008, he was accused by the Metropolitan Police Authority of using his corporate credit card inappropriately and his conduct was investigated by the Chief Constable of Dorset and the IPCC. Dizaei maintained that the allegations were without foundation. On 20 November 2009, after a 14-month investigation, the IPCC found no evidence of dishonesty or impropriety. The IPCC-managed investigation revealed that Dizaei was owed £1,850, which was repaid to him by the Metropolitan Police Authority.

=== Daily Mail and Evening Standard defamation case (2009) ===
In September 2009, Dizaei won a High Court action against the Daily Mail and the Evening Standard over a defamatory article published in June 2008. The newspapers were forced to issue an apology and pay substantial costs and damages.

=== News of the World payment and apology (2009) ===
On 27 December 2009, Dizaei accepted a substantial payment and an apology from the News of the World for allegations arising from an investigation by Mazher Mahmood. The paper backed down and apologized in the face of legal action from Dizaei, after Mahmood claimed the officer "employed an illegal immigrant as his right-hand man and took him to the heart of the British establishment." The paper paid Ace Bakhtyari, who was subsequently jailed for having a fake passport and deported from the UK.

== Trials and criminal conviction (2008-2012) ==
=== Yas Restaurant incident and initial conviction (2008-2010) ===
Dizaei was suspended again on 18 September 2008, after being investigated for various allegations, including an arrest he made on 18 July 2008 outside a west London restaurant. A 24-year-old web designer, Waad al-Baghdadi, claimed that Dizaei had not paid £600 for a website he had commissioned and when Baghdadi confronted him about this, a public quarrel ensued. Dizaei arrested Baghdadi, who later made a complaint which the IPCC investigated.

On 21 May 2009, the Crown Prosecution Service announced that Dizaei faced two criminal charges of misconduct in a public office and perverting the course of justice. The charges related to falsely arresting al-Baghdadi and for filing false accounts of the incident. A decision not to charge that individual was made by the CPS in August 2008. In a statement, the NBPA said: "It is outrageous that the CPS, for the second time in four years, has commenced a prosecution against the president of the National Black Police Association, Commander Ali Dizaei. This has not happened to any other senior police officer in the history of the MPS or the CPS." The matter duly came to trial in the Crown Court at Southwark in January 2010 before the Hon Mr Justice Simon. On 8 February 2010, Dizaei was found guilty on both counts, and jailed for four years.

On 22 June 2010, he was duly refused leave to appeal to the Court of Appeal, Criminal Division. He had sought to appeal against both conviction and sentence. The grounds of the proposed appeal were that al-Baghdadi had used a false name and nationality.

=== Successful appeal (2011) ===
On 16 May 2011, the Court of Appeal granted leave to appeal and allowed the appeal, quashing the convictions. Lord Justice Hughes, Vice-President of the Court of Appeal, said that the court "simply [did] not know whether this conviction is soundly based or not". He continued, "In those circumstances, we are driven to the conclusion that it cannot be regarded as safe." This was even though Waad Al Baghdadi was at this stage only suspected of benefit fraud. A re-trial was ordered and Dizaei was released with immediate effect.

Dizaei wished to clear his name and rejoin Scotland Yard as a Commander.

On 27 June 2011, the key witness in the quashed conviction of Dizaei, Waad Al-Baghdadi, was charged with benefit fraud (in excess of £27,000), which included false disability claims in the name of his deceased father.

On 3 July 2011, the Sunday Times reported an allegation that police pressured a young Muslim woman to withdraw her allegation of rape against Waad Al-Baghdadi. On 13 February 2012, Al-Baghdadi was arrested and bailed in relation to an alleged serious assault in September 2009 and an investigation was reopened into allegations that he raped a young Muslim woman in April and September 2010.

=== Temporary reinstatement (2011) ===
On Friday 1 October 2011, Dizaei was reinstated after a Police Appeals Tribunal meeting gave a unanimous decision in favour of his reinstatement as Commander of the Metropolitan Police. The MPA decided that Dizaei would still be suspended on full pay. Dizaei said that he would appeal that decision. He remained suspended until re-conviction in February 2012.

=== Retrial and reconviction (2012) ===
The retrial of Dizaei on corruption charges and perverting the course of justice began in the Crown Court at Southwark on 12 January 2012 before Mr Justice Saunders. The prosecution claimed that his actions amounted to a wholesale abuse of power for his own personal and oblique reasons.

One prosecution witness, Waad Al Baghdadi, told the jury that he had recently been released from prison for claiming over £27,000 in the name of his dead father. He also admitted lying about his identity at the previous trial.

On 25 January 2012, the prosecution adduced medical evidence suggesting that Dizaei had faked physical injuries to make it look like he had been assaulted.

On 31 January 2012, Dizaei gave evidence relating his version of the events before, during and after the incident of 18 July 2008. He said that Mr Baghdadi's 'torrent of abuse' had frightened Mr Dizaei's wife and other bystanders. Dizaei said he had warned Mr Baghdadi and asked him to leave but arrested him due to his continued abuse and threatening behaviour. In addition, Dizaei claimed that Baghdadi pushed him and poked him twice with the mouthpiece of a shisha pipe. Dizaei also said that Baghdadi is a 'dishonest liar'.

The trial continued and the jury retired to consider its verdict on 9 February 2012.

On 13 February 2012, Dizaei was again convicted of misconduct in public office and attempting to pervert the course of justice. The jury's verdict was unanimous. He was sentenced to three years imprisonment on each count. Since the time he had already served in prison as a result of his earlier conviction is to be taken into account against his sentence, he was expected to be released on licence after about three months. However, he was released on licence, wearing an electronic tag, in February 2012.

On 4 July 2012, Dizaei was granted leave to appeal for the second time. On 14 February 2013, this appeal was dismissed. The Lord Chief Justice said that 'the guilty verdict was fully justified' and that the conviction 'was and remains safe'.

On 5 April 2016, Waad Al Baghdadi admitted (whilst being interviewed by the BBC over his deportation) that "I knew that if I testified against Ali Dezai these things might come to light, but I chose to do the right thing". Going on, he said: "They [Metropolitan Police Service] used me. They held a gun against Ali Dizaei and I was the bullet" after he was told that he was going to be deported by the Home Office. He said British authorities knew he had lied about his past and was a benefit cheat – but were still happy to use him as the key witness to convict Dizaei. Al Baghadi has now been given leave to apply for asylum in Britain.

== Phone hacking ==
Between 2000 - 2001, Andy Hayman (former Assistant Commissioner of the Metropolitan Police) permitted Dizaei's telephone calls to be intercepted and transcribed as part of Operation Helios. In 2006, the Investigatory Powers Tribunal ruled that 3,500 calls were 'unlawfully' intercepted. The Commissioner, Sir Ian Blair apologized. On 20 May 2011, Dizaei was informed that he may have been subject to phone hacking by the News of the World.

Dizaei was the only police officer in the United Kingdom to have his phone hacked by the News of the World. Dizaei was a serving Commander of the MPS when his phone was hacked.

During the Leveson Inquiry, Dick Fedorcio, the then director of public affairs at Scotland Yard, admitted to allowing News of the World journalist Lucy Panton to use his office and computer in Scotland Yard to write a critical story about Dizaei. The inquiry heard that Panton also used Fedorcio's email address to forward the story to the office. In the email, she said she could not delete the email and pointed out it "would not be helpful for people to know" she was using Fedorcio's computer.

== Other police details ==
In August 2008, he was presented with the Long Service and Good Conduct Medal by the Commissioner, Sir Ian Blair.

Dizaei was the President of the National Black Police Association from 2007 to 2009.

== Articles about policing ==
During his time in the police, Dizaei wrote articles for police journals and national newspapers, covering various policing topics.

== Career after prison ==
In 2014, Dizaei formed Covert Security Limited, an international investigations consultancy specializing in tracing and locating assets and individuals and carrying out cold-case reviews.

== Personal life ==
He married Natalie Downing in August 1986 in Reading, Berkshire with whom he has three sons. They divorced in 2005. He married his second wife, Shahameh in August 2007 in Ealing. They have one son.
