= Devon County Constabulary =

English territorial police force

Devon County Constabulary was the Home Office police force for the county of Devon, England, until 1966.

The force was formed in 1856. It absorbed Tavistock Borough Police in 1856, Wolborough Borough Police in 1859, Okehampton Borough Police in 1860, Bradninch Borough Police in 1865, Torquay Borough Police in 1870, South Molton Borough Police in 1877, Torrington Borough Police in 1886 (it had already been absorbed in 1870, but was reformed in 1878), Totnes Borough Police in 1884, Bideford Borough Police in 1889, Barnstaple Borough Police in 1921, and Tiverton Borough Police in 1942. In 1965, it had an establishment of 1,017 officers and an actual strength of 866.

In 1966 it amalgamated with Exeter City Police to form Devon and Exeter Police. On 1 April 1967 this force amalgamated with Cornwall County Constabulary and Plymouth City Police to form Devon and Cornwall Constabulary.

The archives and objects that relate to the force are now held by the Museum of Policing in Devon and Cornwall.

== Chief Constables ==
- 1856–1891 : Gerald de Courcey Hamilton
- 1891–1907 : Francis Randolph Cyril Coleridge
- 1907–1931 : Herbert Reginald Vyvyan
- 1931–1946 : Lyndon Henry Morris
- 1947–1961 : Ranulph Bacon
- 1961–1967 : Col R.B.Greenwood
- 1967 - amalgamated with Cornwall County Constabulary, and Plymouth City having merged with Exeter City the previous year, to form Devon and Cornwall Constabulary
