= Shahameh Dizaei =

Iranian actress

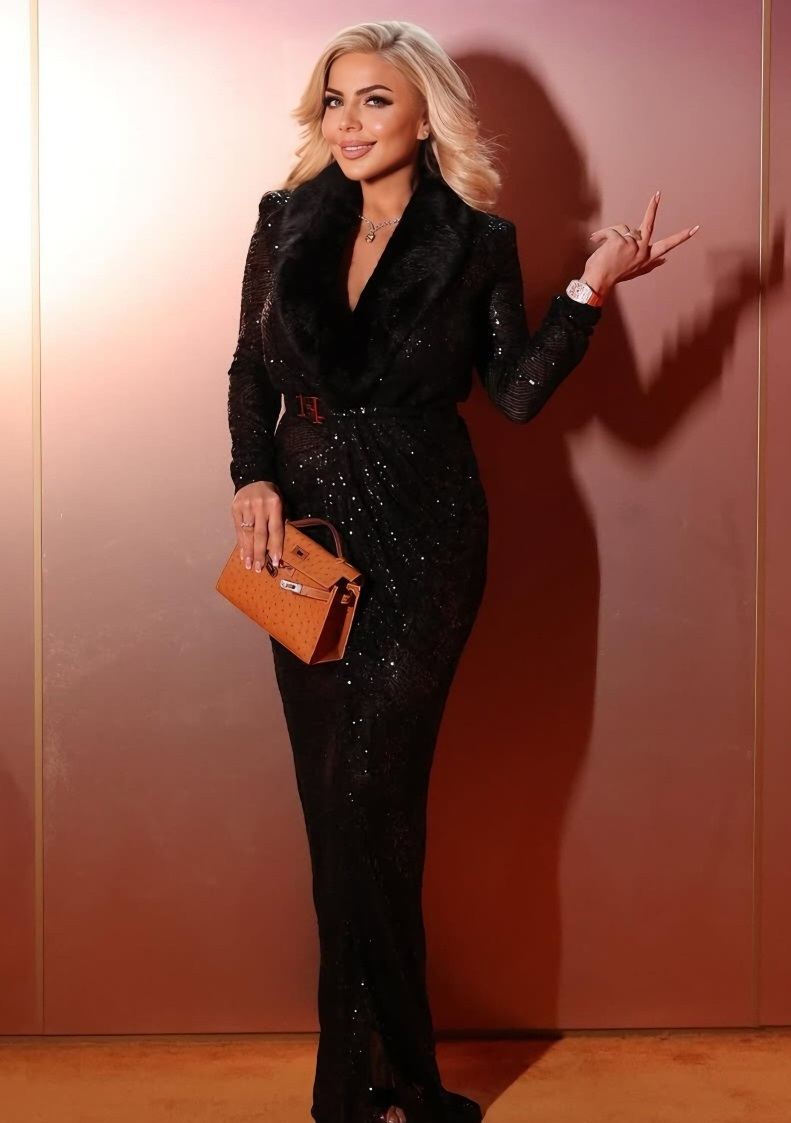
- Born: Tehran
- Occupation: Public Figure
- Spouse: Ali Dizaei

Shahameh Dizaei is an Iranian actress. She is known for her marriage to Ali Dizaei, an Iranian-British police officer and former Metropolitan Police Commander in London.

== Biography ==
Shahameh Dizaei was born in Iran. She pursued her acting career in Iran before marrying Ali Dizaei in 2007. Following their marriage, Shahameh moved to the United Kingdom and has been residing there since at least 2011.

Her marriage to Ali Dizaei brought her into the public eye, particularly during the period of her husband's legal and professional controversies in the UK. Despite this, Shahameh has maintained a relatively private life, focusing on her personal endeavors.

== Personal life ==
Shahameh and Ali Dizaei's marriage has been the subject of public scrutiny, especially during periods of legal controversies involving her husband. However, she has largely stayed out of the spotlight, choosing to support her family privately.

Shahameh has expressed her appreciation for Iranian culture and art, often highlighting the importance of her heritage in her personal life. Living in England has allowed her to engage with both Iranian and British communities, fostering connections between the two cultures.

== Public Attention ==
Shahameh's marriage to Ali Dizaei brought her into the public eye, with significant media coverage during her husband's trials and controversies in the UK. Despite this attention, Shahameh has refrained from public commentary and has focused on preserving her family's privacy.
