= Herbert Hards Sanders =

British police officer

- Born: 1873; Dover, Kent, England
- Died: July 1941 (aged 68); Hove, Sussex, England
- Spouse: Bertha Kemp
- Children: 3
- Relatives: Thomas Osborne Sanders (father); Stephen Sanders (brother)
- Police career
- Department: Metropolitan Police; Plymouth City Police
- Service years: 1894–1929
- Rank: Chief Constable

Herbert Hards Sanders (1873–1941) was a British police officer and Chief Constable, serving in the London Metropolitan and Plymouth Police forces from 1894 to 1929. Sanders was noted as a strong supporter of the needs of rank and file officers, and as well as being properly outfitted and paid, he encouraged those under his command to be philanthropists, Samaritans and "good sports." It was his unwavering belief that no police officer could be good at his job without first being a good sportsman. He also introduced female regular officers to the Plymouth City Police force.

== Early life and family ==
Sanders was born in 1873 in Dover, Kent, to Thomas Osborne Sanders and Eliza Ann Batcheler. His father was Chief Constable of the Dover Police. At age 21 he worked in the clerical department at W.H. Crundall & Company, a timber merchant. In 1899 he married Bertha Kemp, and with her had three children, Thomas, Bertha and Herbert.

On 16 July 1888 his brother Stephen was murdered in Ladonia, Texas, by brick manufacturer T.E. Kilgore. Kilgore had become unhappy at Stephen's rate of work and they ended up in a fight which resulted in Stephen's death. His father Thomas was notified by letter by the Texas authorities that his son had been "foully murdered" and the offender had been caught.

== London Metropolitan Police ==
Sanders joined the London Metropolitan Police in 1894, eventually serving with Special Branch at Scotland Yard and reaching the rank of Divisional Detective Inspector. He worked on a significant number of cases, chiefly the arrest of Nathalia Janotha, the Kaiser's Court pianist, in 1915. Janotha was considered a dangerous "enemy alien" who was suspected to be collaborating with a member of Prime Minister Neville Chamberlain's staff in order to receive information on the bestowing of titles. During the investigation Sanders also arrested Baron von Elssen, brother of the German Governor of Brussels (whom had ordered the execution of a nurse) and Bertha Trost, who was suspected of sending information to Germany long before the outbreak of the First World War.

Sanders prosecuted a large number of persons concerned with the Mile End, Poplar, West Ham and Stepney Guardians, in a case lasting well over three years, and also investigated the theft of the Irish Crown Jewels, which had disappeared in 1908.

== France ==
In his role as Divisional Detective Inspector of Special Branch, Sanders for a short time served alongside the French authorities in Dieppe, before returning to London to lead 'F' Division in the Criminal Investigations Department.

== Plymouth Police ==
Sanders was sworn in as Chief Constable of the Plymouth Borough Police on 1 April 1917, succeeding Joseph Davidson Sowerby who had retired. Common with Chief Constables of the era, he was also sworn in as Chief of the Fire Brigade. Sanders was a strong advocate of change, improvement and evolution, and in 1919 saw in the employment of two women police constables, those being Audrey J. Canney and Isobel F. Taylor, sworn in as Inspector and Constable respectively. He would also see in the introduction of the first motor fire engines and proper uniforms for the Plymouth Police Fire Brigade, and introduce police call boxes to allow the public to communicate easier with the police, fire and ambulance services. He also introduced an up-to-date system of fire alarm bells for the purpose of calling in the fire brigade. He strongly opposed any reduction in police pay and generously awarded both officers and public alike whenever acts of bravery and exceptionally good work were observed, often with uniquely engraved finery.

He was a self-proclaimed philanthropist, and showed great interest in improving the lives of the poor and distressed, something Plymouth had a large problem with due to the frequent arrival of underprivileged persons at the Devonport Dockyard. He set up a depot at the dockyard where the poor were encouraged to send their tattered clothing for cleaning and repair, which would be done personally by Mrs Sanders and a small number of friends. Further efforts would see the raising of considerable amounts of money for relief of the poor, seeing in over one thousand cases of extreme poverty per year of his tenure.

His association with the London Metropolitan Police brought benefits to his command, and Sanders sought a closer working relationship between the two forces. On 9 February 1922, Sanders and a large number of Plymouth police officers attended the annual dinner of the Devonport Division Metropolitan Police Recreation Club at the Grand Hotel, Plymouth. In a number of speeches by the Mayor of Plymouth, H.M. Dockyards' Rear-Admiral Underhill and Chief Constable Sanders, a great comradeship was observed between the two forces.

In 1923 Sanders opted to change the way his officers would be trained, by sending them to the Birmingham City Police where facilities were better. Sanders and his colleagues in the Police Watch Committee had observed that Plymouth lacked adequate buildings to train a large number of officers at once, something the city of Birmingham was not in short supply of. Moreover, the officers would be paid by the Birmingham force for their time, which would consist of long twelve-hour shifts of intense training, something the Police Watch Committee would highlight as a cost-saver for the police budget. At the time of the decision, the strength of the force numbered 280 regulars, with a report from the Chief Constable indicating the force was approximately thirty under the desired strength.

On 23 January 1925 a number of Plymouth Borough Police officers came under attack from a mob of soldiers who had spilled out of Stonehouse Barracks. A number of civilians came to the aid of the officers, who were being bombarded by stones and broken bottles. Sanders commended the men who came to their aid and presented them with gifts of money in a ceremony in April of that year. In May of that year the Commandant of the Plymouth Special Constabulary Mr W.C. Payne retired, and Sanders subsequently brought the running of the organisation under his own.

One his most significant achievements whilst in Plymouth was the founding of the Plymouth Police Widows and Orphans fund, and frequently held fundraisers at the Plymouth Guildhall. In 1929 Sanders advocated the introduction of automated traffic lights to free his constables from point duty. Sanders was an advocate of road safety, and frequently gave talks on the matter to schoolchildren and the general public alike. He rendered considerable service to the National "Safety First" Movement in London and in Plymouth, and was a member of the Schools Propaganda Committee, the Public Safety Committee and was the founder of Plymouth's own "Safety First" initiative, which empowered he and his officers to give talks to the public and schools on road safety. In an interview with the Western Morning News on 9 March 1929, Sanders said:

"Be civil to the policeman, and he will be civil to you. Remember the policeman on point duty has a very difficult task. Don't make it more arduous by asking him questions. Don't pull up and leave your car on the wrong side of the road. It is always dangerous to pass a stationary tramcar on the near side. There is great improvement in the driving of motorists compared with five years ago. Help it to improve still more."

Sanders was in charge when Plymouth achieved city status in 1928, and accordingly the Plymouth Borough Police was renamed Plymouth City Police.

In May 1929 Sanders personally escorted visiting Prime Minister Stanley Baldwin and his wife Lucy to The Grand Hotel.

== Later career and death ==
In July 1929, Sanders tendered his resignation to the Police Watch Committee, citing his wife's failing health as the reason for his retirement. On announcing his retirement he paid special thanks to his colleague Superintendent Cooms, whom had been Sanders' right-hand man for many years, and had run the force whenever Sanders had cause to be absent. He officially stood down on 30 September, and was permitted to keep his uniform as a souvenir of his service. He was succeeded by Archibald Kennedy Wilson, former officer of the Carlisle Police.

H.H. Sanders died in Hove, Sussex, in July 1941, aged 68. He was cremated in Brighton on 18 July, an event which was well-attended by members of the Plymouth police.
