= Herbert Reginald Vyvyan =

Captain Herbert Reginald Vyvyan OBE (1867–1949) was a British soldier, police officer and Chief Constable of Devon Constabulary from 1907 to 1931.

== Early life ==
Vyvyan was born in 1862 in Hastings, Sussex, to Reverend Herbert Francis Vyvyan and Augusta Clara de Schmiedern and spent his childhood in Withiel, Cornwall. He was schooled at Cheltenham College, and after a short period in Germany returned to England and continued his education at Brackenbury, and Wynne College in Wimbledon. On 6 January 1889 he married Caroline Jane Hunt in Lahore, presidency of Bengal, and with her had a son and a daughter.

== Military career ==
On leaving college Vyvyan was gazetted with the Cornish Rangers, billeted in Bodmin, a unit which in July 1881 became the 3rd Duke of Cornwall's Light Infantry. Before the outbreak of the First Boer War he resigned his commission, but re-enlisted in 1885 with the Devonshire Regiment, with the rank of lieutenant from 23 May 1885. He was promoted to captain on 14 November 1892. During the Second Boer War he was adjutant to the 1st Rifle Volunteers, and in 1902 at war's end he was appointed part of the Reparation Commission which oversaw the re-establishment of the Boers on their farms, and for also dealing with claims. Vyvyan returned to his regiment on 1 January 1903, but retired from the military late the same year and moved to Exeter.

Whilst in military service he established himself as a keen sportsman, playing golf and cricket for his regiment.

== Devon Constabulary ==
On retirement from the Army in 1903, Vyvyan was appointed Superintendent of the Devon Constabulary, Cullompton Division, a post he held until 1907. Upon the retirement of Chief Constable F. R. C. Coleridge in that year, Vyvyan was promoted to Chief Constable.

In the 1928 Birthday Honours, for services to the police, he was appointed an Officer of the Order of the British Empire (OBE).

He retired from the police on 1 April 1931 and was succeeded by Lyndon Henry Morris.

== Later activities & death ==
In 1938 Vyvyan married as his 2nd wife Emmeline Mabel Carlyon, the widow of Lieutenant-Colonel A. F. Carlyon, R.A.M.C. The ceremony was held at the British Consulate in Alexandria, Egypt.

Vyvyan died in a care home in Worthing, aged 87. He was the heir presumptive to his kinsman, Sir Richard Philip Vyvyan, 11th Baronet.
