= Plymouth City Police =

Defunct police force

Plymouth City Police, known as Plymouth Borough Police until 1928, was the city police force for Plymouth, Devon, until 1967. The borough of Plymouth achieved city status in 1928.

== Formation ==
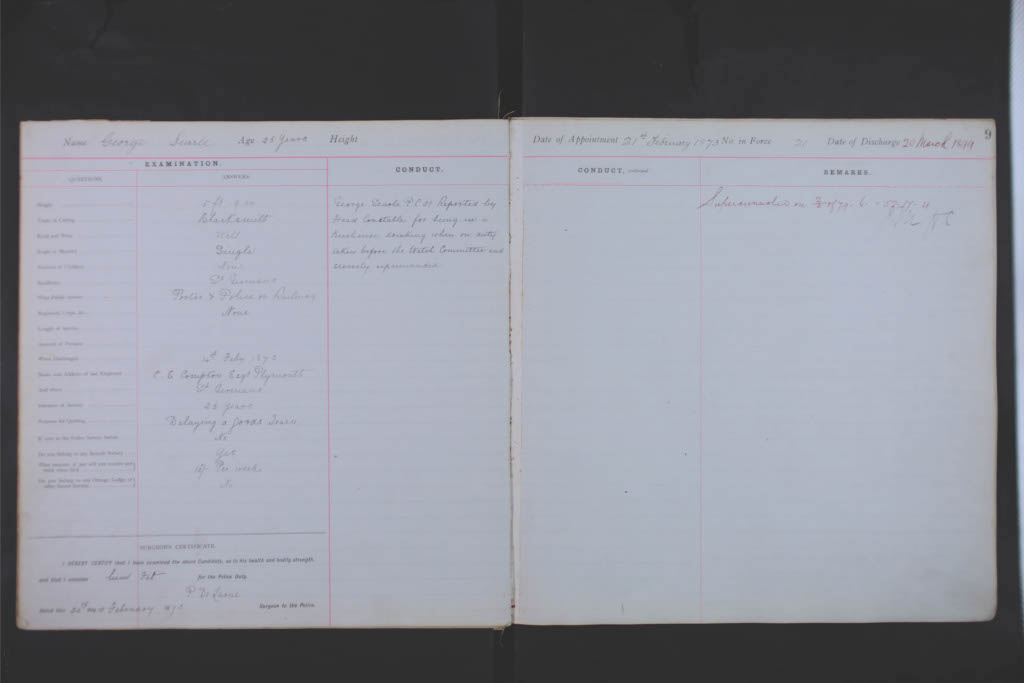
Devonport Borough Police Register, 1862-1914.

Until 1914, Plymouth was policed by three distinct police forces, each responsible for their own borough, those being Stonehouse (policed by Devon County Constabulary), Devonport and Plymouth. When Plymouth achieved city status in 1928, the Plymouth Borough Police was renamed Plymouth City Police (or the City of Plymouth Police Force.) In 1914, the boroughs of Stonehouse and Devonport had been absorbed into Plymouth, and so the Plymouth City Police became the sole authority for the area.

== Governance ==
Like most forces at the time, the Plymouth City Police was led by a Chief Constable who was appointed by a Police Watch Committee.

== Presentation ==
The Plymouth City Police uniform was a carryover of the former borough force, with a new force crest designed based on the previous. Like most forces of the UK, Police War Reserves wore the letters “WR” on their collars.

== Dartmoor Prison Mutiny ==
On 24 January 1932, officers of the Plymouth City Force were called into action to help quell disorder at Dartmoor Prison in Princetown, Yelverton. At around 10.30am, the Chief Constable Mr A.K. Wilson left Plymouth in a police car, followed closely by a Western National bus containing thirty-one police officers. Officers of the Devon County Constabulary, including its Chief Constable Mr Lyndon Henry Morris, also made their way to the prison. Morris tried to negotiate with the prisoners, but when this failed the thirty-one strong force entered the grounds and successfully calmed the rioters.

== World War 2 ==
Plymouth was heavily bombed during the Second World War, and on 30 April 1940 the force suffered its first casualty when Police Sergeant Edward Gibbs was killed along with his brother Sydney, and nephew David, during a raid on the Royal Dockyard in Devonport. Police infrastructure was severely affected by bombs, leaving the telephone exchange at police headquarters inoperable on 20 March 1941. Other officers to die on duty or in service overseas include seven regulars, two reserves, five Special Constables and three police war reserves.

== Women Police Officers ==
The force had its first woman officers on 18 June 1919 when Miss Audrey Canney and Miss Isobel Taylor were appointed as Inspector and Constable respectively. On 29 November 1946 Miss Iris Martin became the first WPC to perform point duty.

== Chief constables ==
The first Chief Constable was Herbert Hards Sanders. He was succeeded by Mr K. Archibald Wilson, who held the post until 1932 before leaving to become Chief Constable of the Liverpool City Police. William Clarence Johnson succeeded Mr Wilson, and remained in office until 1936 when he left to become Deputy Chief Constable of Birmingham City Police. Mr George Sydney Lowe led the force from 1936 to 1941 and was succeeded by William Thomas Hutchings, who died suddenly in 1943 making way for Mr John Fawke Skittery, who holds the distinction of being the longest serving Chief Constable of the force, leading it until his retirement on 30 June 1965. He was succeeded by Mr Ronald Gregory until the force was merged with Devon & Cornwall on 1 June 1967.

== Headquarters ==
The headquarters of Plymouth City Police were situated at the Plymouth Guildhall. In 1933 the old prison at Greenbank was selected as the new site for police, fire, courts and weights & measures office. The conversion was completed in 1935 and hailed as a very important step for the city’s public services. In 1943 the station at Greenbank was abandoned following a bomb blast and officers temporarily relocated to Widey Court, before returning to Greenbank. The building at Widey Court was selected as a contingency as early as 1941.

== Abolition ==
The Plymouth City Police amalgamated with Exeter, Devon and Cornwall and became part of the Devon & Cornwall Constabulary on 1 June 1967, bringing an end to over 130 years of fragmented policing for the two counties. Plymouth maintains to this day its own relative autonomy as it has its own Basic Command Unit (BCU) led by a Chief Superintendent. Three police stations exist, at Devonport, Charles Cross and Crownhill. Only Charles Cross is open to the public, and Crownhill is the site of one of Devon & Cornwall Police’s two control rooms, the other being located at Middlemoor in Exeter. The Ministry of Defence Police have concurrent jurisdiction over the dockyard areas and HMS Raleigh, and the British Transport Police have offices at Plymouth railway station.

The archives and objects that relate to the force are now held by the Museum of Policing in Devon and Cornwall.
