= Stephen Otter =

British chief constable (born 1962)

Chief Constable Stephen Otter QPM

Chief Constable of Devon and Cornwall Police
- In office January 2007 – March 2012
- Preceded by: Maria Wallis
- Succeeded by: Shaun Sawyer

Personal details
- Born: Stephen Otter; 24 May 1962 (age 63)
- Profession: Police officer

Stephen Otter (born 24 May 1962) is a former chief constable of Devon and Cornwall Police, a post he held from joining the force in January 2007 until his departure in March 2012. He was succeeded by Shaun Sawyer.

Otter was previously the deputy chief constable at Avon & Somerset Constabulary, and has also served during his career with Thames Valley Police, the Metropolitan Police and the Royal Hong Kong Police Force. He was the Association of Chief Police Officers' ACPO lead on race and diversity during his time at Devon and Cornwall Police.

Otter was awarded the Queen's Police Medal in the New Year Honours list of 2008.

As of 2013, he worked at Her Majesty's Inspectorate of Constabulary, overseeing the National Team. As of 2015, Otter was paid a salary of between £190,000 and £194,999 by the department, making him one of the 328 most highly paid people in the British public sector at that time.

== Honours ==
- He was awarded the Queen's Police Medal (QPM) in the 2008 New Years Honours List.

Ribbon	Description	Notes
	Queen's Police Medal (QPM)	For Distinguished Service; 2008 New Years Honours List
	Queen Elizabeth II Golden Jubilee Medal	2002; UK Version of this Medal
	Queen Elizabeth II Diamond Jubilee Medal	2012; UK Version of this Medal
	Police Long Service and Good Conduct Medal	

Police appointments
Preceded by Maria Wallis	Chief Constable of Devon and Cornwall Police; 2007–2012	Succeeded by Shaun Sawyer
