= Will Kerr (police officer) =

British police officer, latterly Chief Constable

Chief Constable Will Kerr OBE KPM

Chief Constable of Devon and Cornwall Police
- In office December 2022 – July 2025
- Preceded by: Shaun Sawyer

Personal details
- Born: William James Kerr
- Awards: KPM

William James Kerr is a Northern Irish police officer who subsequently became chief constable of Devon and Cornwall Police. He was suspended from that role in July 2023.

Kerr served as a police officer in Northern Ireland for 27 years, serving with both the Royal Ulster Constabulary (RUC) and its successor, the Police Service of Northern Ireland (PSNI), eventually attaining the rank of assistant chief constable, leading on serious crime and counter terrorism. In 2018, he joined Police Scotland, becoming deputy chief constable, and in December 2022 joined Devon and Cornwall Police.

He was elected as a European delegate to Interpol's executive committee in November 2021.

In July 2023, he was suspended on full pay, on suspicion of misconduct relating to an investigation by the PSNI into "allegations of serious sexual assault" and of misconduct in public office.

In April 2025, the Public Prosecution Service for Northern Ireland announced that it would not be prosecuting Kerr for any of the alleged offences.

In July 2025, Kerr announced that he would be taking early retirement.

== Honours ==
Kerr was appointed an Officer of the Order of the British Empire (OBE) in the 2015 Birthday Honours and awarded the King's Police Medal in the 2023 New Year Honours.

Ribbon	Description	Notes
	Order of the British Empire (OBE)	2015 Queen's Birthday Honours List; For services to Policing and the community in Northern Ireland; Civil Division
	King's Police Medal (KPM)	2023 New Years Honours List; For Distinguished Service
	Queen Elizabeth II Golden Jubilee Medal	2002; UK version of this medal
	Queen Elizabeth II Diamond Jubilee Medal	2012; UK version of this medal
	Queen Elizabeth II Platinum Jubilee Medal	2022; UK version of this medal
	King Charles III Coronation Medal	2023; UK version of this medal
	Police Long Service and Good Conduct Medal	
	Royal Ulster Constabulary Service Medal	
	Police Service of Northern Ireland Service Medal	

Police appointments
Preceded by Shaun Sawyer	Chief Constable of Devon and Cornwall Police; 2013 – July 2025	Succeeded by Jim Colwell (acting)
