= Devon and Cornwall Police =

English territorial police force

- Coat of arms
- Motto: In Auxilium Omnium; To the assistance of everybody

Agency overview
- Formed: 1 April 1967; 59 years ago
- Preceding agencies: Devon and Exeter Police; Cornwall County Constabulary; Plymouth City Police
- Annual budget: £372 million (2022–2023)

Jurisdictional structure
- Operations jurisdiction: Devon and Cornwall
- Map of police area
- Area: 3,967 square miles (10,270 km^{2})
- Population: 1.79 million
- Legal jurisdiction: England and Wales
- Constituting instrument: Police Act 1996
- General nature: Local civilian police

Operational structure
- Overseen by: His Majesty's Inspectorate of Constabulary/Independent Office for Police Conduct
- Headquarters: Middlemoor, Exeter, Devon
- Police officers: 3,593 (March 2021); 549 special constables (March 2021)
- PCSOs: 320 (March 2021)
- Police and crime commissioner responsible: Alison Hernandez (Conservative)
- Agency executive: James Vaughan (interim), Chief constable
- BCUs: 4

Website
- www.devon-cornwall.police.uk

Devon and Cornwall Police is the territorial police force responsible for policing the ceremonial counties of Devon and Cornwall (including the Isles of Scilly) in South West England. The force serves approximately 1.8 million people over an area of 3,967 square miles (10,270 km^{2}).

== History ==
The force was formed on 1 April 1967, by the amalgamation of the Devon and Exeter Police, Cornwall County Constabulary and Plymouth City Police. These three constabularies were in turn amalgamations of 23 city and borough police forces that were absorbed between 1856 and 1947.

Between 1856 and 1947, police in Devon and Cornwall used a number of different names. They were gradually absorbed into two of the existing forces called Devon and Exeter Constabulary and Cornwall County Constabulary, with Plymouth City Police remaining separate. In 1967 these three remaining forces were amalgamated into one called Devon and Cornwall Constabulary or Devon and Cornwall Police.

The archives and objects that relate to Devon and Cornwall Police and its antecedent forces are now held by the Museum of Policing in Devon and Cornwall.

In July 2023, the police and crime commissioner (PCC) suspended Chief Constable Will Kerr over sexual allegations. While that was being investigated, the PCC appointed Acting Chief Constable Jim Colwell. In November 2024, the PCC suspended the acting chief constable over allegations relating to messages sent on a police-provided mobile phone, and in December appointed the retired chief constable of Dorset Police, James Vaughan, as interim chief constable.

=== Chief constables ===
- 1967–1973 Colonel Ronald Berry Greenwood
- 1973–1982 John Cottingham Alderson
- 1982–1984? David Albert East
- 1984?–1989 Donald Elliott
- 1989–2002 Sir John Stanley Evans (knighted in 2000 New Year Honours)
- 2002–2006 Maria Wallis
- 2007–2012 Stephen Otter
- 2013–2022 Shaun Sawyer
- 2022–2023 Will Kerr Suspended July 2023.
- 2023–2024 Jim Colwell (acting chief constable) Suspended pending investigation from November 2024.
- 2024 James Vaughan (interim chief constable)

=== Officers killed in the line of duty ===
The Police Roll of Honour Trust and Police Memorial Trust list and commemorate all British police officers killed in the line of duty. Since its establishment in 1984, the Police Memorial Trust has erected 50 memorials nationally to some of those officers.

Since 1814, the following officers of Devon and Cornwall Constabulary and its predecessors were killed while attempting to prevent or stop a crime in progress:

- Town Sergeant Joseph Burnett, 1814 (shot attempting to disarm two drunken soldiers)
- PC William Bennett, 1875 (injured arresting a man for assault)
- PC Walter Creech, 1883 (stabbed by a man he warned)
- PC John Tremlett Potter, 1938 (fatally injured by two burglars he disturbed)
- PC Dennis Arthur Smith, 1973 (shot by a suspect he was pursuing)
- PC Christopher Francis Wilson, 1977 (contracted a fatal illness after being spat on during a disturbance at a football match)
- PC Joseph James Childs and PC Martin Ross Reid, 1978 (drowned after their car was swept into the sea during a storm)

== Oversight ==
Since 5 May 2016, the Devon and Cornwall Police and Crime Commissioner is Alison Hernandez, who represents the Conservative Party. The police and crime commissioner is scrutinised by the Devon and Cornwall Police and Crime Panel, made up of elected councillors from the local authorities in the police area. Before November 2012, the force was governed by the Devon and Cornwall Police Authority.

== Organisation ==
As of September 2020, the force has 3,593 individual police officers, 549 special constables, 320 police community support officers (PCSO), and 2,236 staff. Training for new recruits is held at the Headquarters in Middlemoor. For constables, it consists of eight months training and a two-year probationary period. For special constables it consists of three months of online learning and practical weekends training and a two-year probationary period or less, dependent on the number of tours of duty. For PCSOs, it consists of 18 weeks training and a 15-week probationary period. Recruits receive their warrant card and uniform in the first two months of training.

The force is divided into four Basic Command Units (BCU), each commanded by a Chief Superintendent. Geographically larger BCUs are further split into Local Policing Areas (LPAs), under a Superintendent, which are further sub-divided into Sectors, each under an Inspector. The Plymouth and South Devon BCUs only contain one LPA, being divided directly into sectors. Most sectors contain a police station, while in Plymouth there are numerous neighbourhood bases or police stations (Crownhill, Charles Cross, Plympton, Devonport).

Each BCU will have several specialist teams, including Patrol, Neighbourhood Policing Teams, a Criminal Investigation Department and various pro-active policing units to target persistent criminals and focus on specific operations.

The four BCUs are:

- Cornwall and the Isles of Scilly BCU
  - East Cornwall geographic LPA
  - West Cornwall geographic LPA
- South Devon BCU
- Devon BCU
  - Exeter East and Mid geographic LPA
  - North and West Devon geographic LPA
- Plymouth BCU
  - Plymouth geographic area

=== Force contact centre ===
The force contact centre is located at two sites: police HQ in Middlemoor, Exeter and Crownhill police station in Plymouth, both operating 24/7. Calls from all parts of the force are assigned to the next available agent, whichever site they are working from. Calls are answered by trained civilian staff, with police officers in some supporting and supervisory roles. Both 999/112 and non-emergency calls are answered by multiskilled staff, with other duties including the Force Switchboard, found property recording, crime recording, requests from other police forces, emails from the public, and the force website. Radio dispatch officers are located in the control rooms at both sites and deploy police officers following calls for service from the contact centre. The two control rooms use the national Airwave emergency service secure radio system, which is due to be replaced in the early 2020s.

=== Operations department ===
The operations department provides uniformed operational support to the force, and is responsible for traffic policing and tactical support.

==== Roads policing Team ====
Devon and Cornwall Police patrol a section of the M5, as well as many 'A' roads. The team is split up into 5 stations across the force. These are Exeter, Plymouth, Barnstaple, Bodmin and Camborne. They deploy in marked and unmarked high performance vehicles. The unit also has officers that patrol on marked and unmarked motorcycles.

Roads Policing officers conduct proactive enforcement on the roads as well as investigating serious and fatal road traffic collisions.

Under the Roads Policing Team is the No Excuse Team. This is a proactive roads policing team that deploy predominantly in unmarked high performance vehicles to enforce against Fatal 5 offences.

==== Force Support Group ====
The Force Support Group (FSG), previously called the Tactical Aid Group (TAG), is predominantly responsible for public order, marine operations, searches and dealing with potentially violent offenders.

The FSG's Marine Support Unit, also known as FSG D Section, is responsible for underwater search and marine operations.

==== Dog section ====
The force has police dogs, which are trained in a variety of roles including drugs dogs, explosives dogs and firearms support dogs. The unit, which is headed up by an inspector, is based at headquarters in Middlemoor, in Exeter.

==== Armed response ====
Also under Devon and Cornwall's Operations Department is the Firearms Unit. All officers are trained as Armed Response Vehicle Officers (ARVOs), with the additional Tactical Firearms Team (TFT) who are SFO's. The ARVs are tasked with responding to incidents where firearms and other weapons are involved. They are routinely armed.

==== Air Operations Unit ====
Air support is provided by the National Police Air Service (NPAS), which operates a dedicated police helicopter out of Exeter Airport.

The now-closed Air Operations Unit previous flew a MBB/Kawasaki BK 117. It took delivery of a Eurocopter EC145 in April 2010, with its call sign being OSCAR 99. The unit was able scramble in two minutes and could reach most areas of the force within 15 minutes.

=== Force crime department ===
The force crime department contains the central units of the force's Criminal Investigation Department (CID), which also has detectives attached to the larger police stations. It is headed by the force crime manager, a detective chief superintendent. It also comprises the major crime branch, covert operations unit, intelligence unit, performance and co-ordination unit, scientific and technical services unit.

=== Other departments ===
- The Contingency Planning Unit formulates long-term plans to deal with major incidents, including security for VIP visits, counterterrorist operations and reaction to terrorist attacks.
- The Force Planning and Consultation Unit formulates policy and plans and monitors public opinion on policing matters.
- The Professional Standards Department deals with force discipline and complaints against officers.

== Uniforms and equipment ==
=== Headgear ===
In 2020, the force moved to a gender neutral position on headwear, permitting any officer to wear a (traditionally) male or female hat – either the custodian helmet, or a peaked cap with a chequered Sillitoe tartan band, or a bowler hat, also with Sillitoe tartan, under all circumstances.

Traffic police headgear is the same as that for any other vehicle patrol but has a white rather than a black top, originally designed to aid visibility before the advent of fluorescent fabrics.

PCSOs wear a peaked cap or bowler hat, but with a blue band.

Tri Service Safety Officers (TSSOs) wear a peaked cap or bowler, with a grey band.

=== Uniform ===
When on operational duty, officers wear black wicken layer tops with black trousers and a black fleece with POLICE written on the chest and back. All officers are required to wear stab vests when on operational duty. Collar numbers for constables and sergeants, along with rank insignia for sergeants and above are worn either on epaulettes on the shoulder, or on patches on the upper arm, depending on the item of clothing. PCSOs wear a similar uniform, but with blue epaulettes rather than black.

Formal dress comprises an open-necked tunic, and a white shirt/blouse with a black tie for officers of all genders. Constables and sergeants have collar numbers on their epaulettes, sergeants wear rank insignia on their sleeve, while all higher-ranked officers wear name badges and their rank on their epaulettes. Gloves are sometimes worn.

=== Personal equipment ===
From 2018, both officers and PCSOs were provided with personal issue Combat Application Tourniquets for first aid and self aid purposes.

From 2019, officers were issued with Spit Guards, a transparent mesh that covers a suspect's face should they spit at officers.

From 2019, after over a decade of false starts, operational officers and PCSOs were issued with Body Worn Video Police body cameras.

Police vehicles contain a variety of equipment, which can include straight batons, traffic cones, road signs, breathalysers, stingers, speed guns and more.

=== Vehicles ===
Vauxhall Vivaro of Devon and Cornwall Police, photographed in 2022

Devon and Cornwall Police use many different makes of vehicles from several different manufacturers for different purposes. All marked operational vehicles wear yellow and blue retro-reflective battenberg markings.

== Performance and PEEL inspection ==
In 2010, Devon and Cornwall had the fourth lowest crime rate per 1,000 people in England. Recorded crime dropped by 12% between June 2009 and July 2010, compared to an 8% drop across England and Wales. In this survey, there were drops in all categories of crime except sexual offences and drug crimes, accounted for by increased reporting and more effective targeting of drug offences. Confidence in the police and public perceptions of crime were also better than the national average.

His Majesty's Inspectorate of Constabulary and Fire & Rescue Services (HMICFRS) conducts a periodic police effectiveness, efficiency and legitimacy (PEEL) inspection of each police service's performance. In February 2023, the force was awarded the following grades in its PEEL inspection:

HMICFRS Peel inspection rating
| | Outstanding | Good | Adequate | Requires Improvement | Inadequate |
|---|---|---|---|---|---|
| 2021/22 | | Preventing crime; Developing a positive workplace | Treatment of the public; Protecting vulnerable people | Investigating crime; Good use of resources | Recording data about crime; Responding to the public; Managing offenders |

== Budget cuts ==
=== Proposed regional merger ===
In 2006, the Home Office announced plans to amalgamate a number of English and Welsh police forces in order to better combat the terrorism and organised crime that crosses force boundaries. The proposed idea would have merged Devon and Cornwall Police with Wiltshire Police, Avon and Somerset Police and Dorset Police. The plans, which would have cut the number of forces in England and Wales from 43 to 24, were abandoned in July 2006. However, in 2010 alternative plans were put forward which would have included Gloucestershire Police in a West Country merger. These plans were criticised by four of the forces involved, expressing concerns that they would lead to poor quality service and a reduction in local policing.

=== Austerity ===
The program of austerity from 2011 had an impact on the force:

- The rural crime grant, worth £1.8M to Devon & Cornwall, about the cost of 70 officers, was abolished.
- The central government grant was cut by 20%.
- In comparison to other forces, the council tax precept was low. Rises in the precept were capped by central government.

The organisation was forced to cut officers, from 3,500 to 2,810. It also had to cut PCSOs and police staff, losing around 350 posts. Many stations were closed and sold, controversially including a brand new station at St Columb Major. The service offered to the public was scaled back: for example in the past victims of car crime or burglary would have seen an officer in person. Since the austerity cuts, the majority of these crimes are 'desktop investigated' by a centralised team.

A partial reversal of the cuts was announced in 2019 by the (then) new Prime Minister Boris Johnson, who pledged to replace 20,000 of the 21,000 officers cut in England and Wales since 2011.

Devon & Cornwall officer numbers are not expected to return to their 2010 levels until 2023. There are no plans nationally to reverse the cut in police staff.

=== Proposed merger with Dorset ===
Later, from 2015, plans to merge with Dorset Police were brought to an advanced stage and an outline business case supplied to the Home Office. In the final stage of talks, three of the four parties agreed to proceed, being the Chief Constables of both forces and the Police & Crime Commissioner (PCC) of Dorset. However, Devon & Cornwall PCC Alison Hernandez withdrew her support for the merger, in a U-turn. It is thought her change of heart was a result of pressure from the local authorities, notably members of Cornwall Council and Torbay Council and the plans were shelved.

== Other activities ==
=== Devon and Cornwall Police Pipes and Drum Band ===
The Devon and Cornwall Police Pipes and Drum Band is a band made up of pipe and drums players who play on behalf of the police force in aid of charity. The band plays at fundraising events for Devon Air Ambulance, Help for Heroes and other events, as well at police occasions such as officer graduations.

The band is made up of officers and employees of Devon and Cornwall Police, as well as some members who are not related to the police. The band is not funded or related to the police force but do have permission to use their name and uniform.

=== Devon and Cornwall Police Rugby Football Club ===
The Devon and Cornwall RFC was formed in 1967 following the amalgamation of the Devon, Cornwall and Plymouth Constabularies clubs. A few midweek and Sunday games were played and players were encouraged to play for club sides on Saturdays. However the Saturday team was disbanded in May 1995 due to operational commitments. Today the force still manages to bring together a team when necessary, and play in the National Cup Competition every year.

=== Social media ===
In 2015, BBC News Online reported that the force had been involved in a number of social media "blunders", including officers making inappropriate use of Facebook and Twitter, and a Twitter campaign image that had to be withdrawn when it was pointed out that it appeared to depict a police riot officer beating a person lying on the ground with a truncheon.

=== Stella the dog ===
Stella was a dog that was seized in 2014. Devon and Cornwall Police said the pit bull-type dog was considered potentially dangerous. The department put the dog in a 3 ft by 9 ft cage in Devon until 2016 when a destruction order for Stella was passed by Torquay Magistrates' Court. The dog was reported to have not had exercise and was left in the cage for 24 hours a day for nearly two years. The courts had until 8 March 2016 to appeal the euthanasia of Stella. Sgt Allan Knight, from the Devon and Cornwall Police dog handling unit, said: "There will always be some dogs who cannot get walked by staff because of the danger they possess. We are bound by the court process."

=== Sensory learning tool initiative ===
Sensory library boards designed to help people with attention deficit hyperactivity disorder (ADHD) or sensory issues have been introduced to help neurodivergent student police officers training in classroom environments by the Devon and Cornwall Police force.

== Deaths following Devon and Cornwall Police contact ==
There have been a number of deaths of members of the public who have come into contact with Devon and Cornwall Police.

- Thomas Orchard, 32, was arrested and taken to a police station in Exeter, where he was restrained, in October 2012. He died in hospital seven days later.
- Marc Cole, 30, died in Falmouth, Cornwall, in May 2017 after a taser was deployed for 42 seconds, resulting in a cardiac arrest. He had taken cocaine the same day. The Independent Office for Police Conduct (IOPC) concluded that the performance of its officers was not below standard.
- Andrew Pimlott, 32, died from burns in April 2013. Pimlott, who had drenched himself in fuel, was tasered, which ignited the fuel and caused his burns.
- Leslie ("Les") Douthwaite, 38, died in April 2015 after being restrained, face down, by police.
- John Coysh, 35, died in police custody in September 2016, from cardiac arrhythmia during alcohol withdrawal.
- Simeon Francis, 35, died in a cell in Torquay police station on 20 May 2020 after being arrested in Exeter. Simeon died of epilepsy, and a subsequent investigation concluded that he was not discriminated against, and there was no case to answer against the force in relation to his death.

== Statistics ==
The force receives 500 to 800 emergency 999 calls, plus 2,000 to 2,500 non-emergency 101 calls every day. In the year ending January 2016, the force dealt with 5,151 missing person reports. Firearms officers were deployed on 351 occasions in the year ending March 2020.

== See also ==
- List of law enforcement agencies in the United Kingdom, Crown Dependencies and British Overseas Territories
- Law enforcement in the United Kingdom
