= Devon and Cornwall Police and Crime Commissioner =

Elected official in South West England

- Incumbent; Alison Hernandez since 12 May 2016
- Police and crime commissioner of Devon and Cornwall Police
- Reports to: Devon and Cornwall Police and Crime Panel
- Appointer: Electorate of Devon and Cornwall
- Term length: Four years
- Constituting instrument: Police Reform and Social Responsibility Act 2011
- Precursor: Devon and Cornwall Police Authority
- Inaugural holder: Tony Hogg
- Formation: 22 November 2012
- Deputy: Deputy Police and Crime Commissioner
- Salary: £88,600
- Website: http://www.devonandcornwall-pcc.gov.uk/

The Devon and Cornwall Police and Crime Commissioner is the police and crime commissioner, an elected official tasked with setting out the way crime is tackled by Devon and Cornwall Police in the English counties of Devon and Cornwall (including the Isles of Scilly). The post was created in November 2012, following an election held on 15 November 2012, and replaced the Devon and Cornwall Police Authority. The current incumbent is Alison Hernandez, who previously represented the Conservative Party but is now an independent. The Office of the Devon and Cornwall Police and Crime Commissioner currently employs 32 members of staff.

== List of Devon and Cornwall Police and Crime Commissioners ==
Name	Political party	Dates in office
Tony Hogg	Conservative Party	22 November 2012 to 11 May 2016
Alison Hernandez	Conservative Party	12 May 2016 to 5 January 2026
Alison Hernandez	Independent	5 January 2026 to present.

== Electoral record ==
=== 2024 election ===
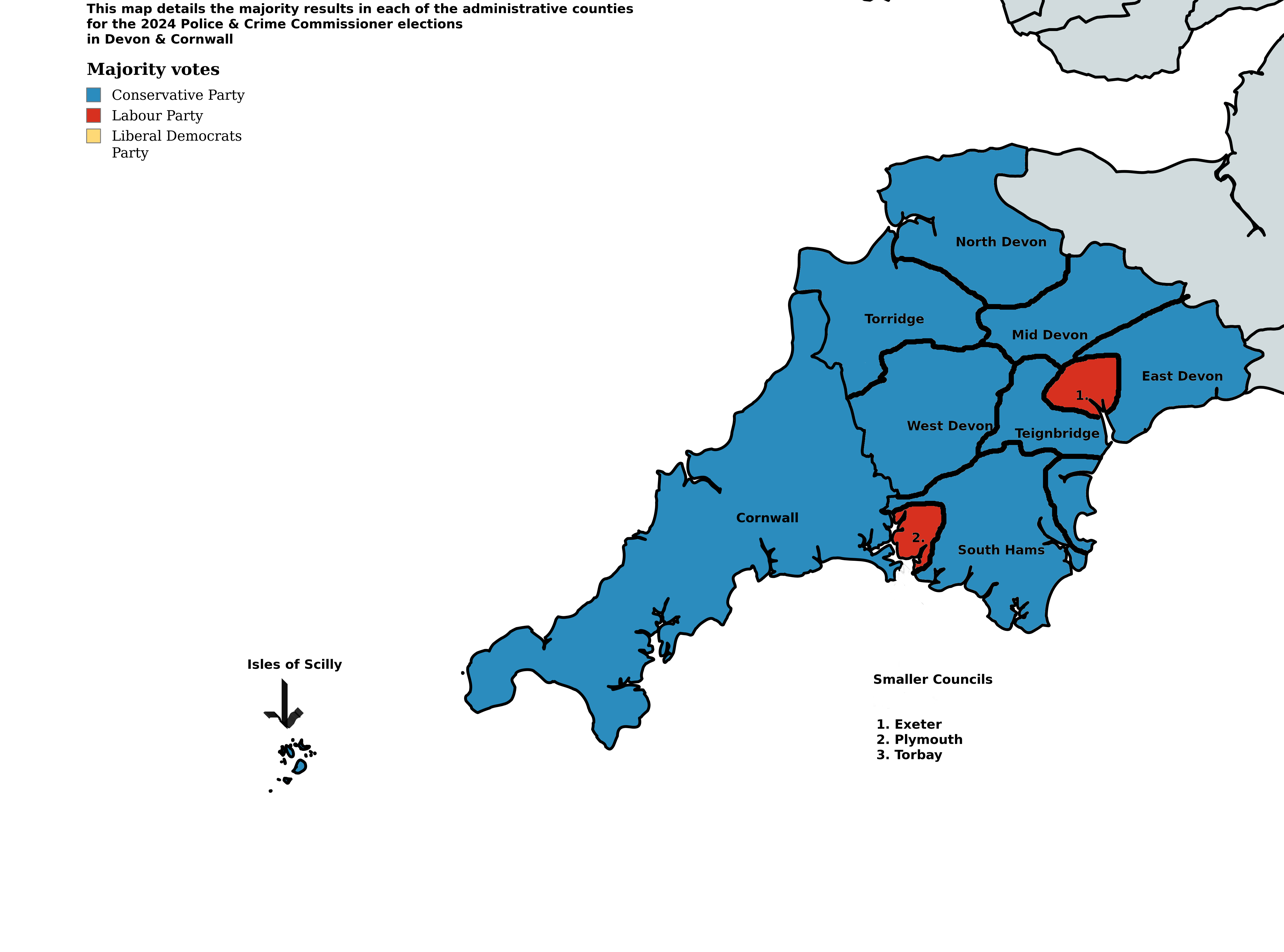
The majority voted for party in the 2024 Police & Crime Commissioner election by local authorities.

Devon and Cornwall Police and Crime Commissioner election, 2024
Party	Candidate	Votes	%	±%
Conservative	Alison Selina (Sosa) Hernandez	131,764	43.3	−6.7
Labour Co-op	Daniel John Steel	107,897	35.4	+15.2
Liberal Democrats	Steve Lodge	64,790	21.3	+3.4
Turnout		304,451	22.5	−13.6
Majority		23,867	7.9	−21.87

Devon and Cornwall Police and Crime Commissioner election, 2024, Plymouth Results
Party	Candidate	Votes	%	±%
Labour Co-op	Daniel John Steel	28,645	47.69	+15.2
Conservative	Alison Selina (Sosa) Hernandez	23,364	38.87	−11.18
Liberal Democrats	Steve Lodge	8,073	13.44	+4.81
Turnout		60,064		
Majority		5,281	8.82	

Devon & Cornwall Police and Crime Commissioner election, 2024. Cornwall results only.
Party	Candidate	Votes	%	±%
Conservative	Alison Selina (Sosa) Hernandez	35,536	43.76	−6.04
Labour	Daniel John Steel	28,290	34.84	+16.24
Liberal Democrats	Steve Robert Lodge	17,372	21.39	+1.89
Turnout		81,210	18.8	?
Majority		7246	8.92	−23.31

Devon & Cornwall Police and Crime Commissioner election, 2024. Isles of Scilly results only.
Party	Candidate	Votes	%	±%
Conservative	Alison Selina (Sosa) Hernandez	134	49.63	−2.7
Labour	Daniel John Steel	77	28.52	+12.07
Liberal Democrats	Steve Robert Lodge	59	21.85	+4.36
Turnout		270	?	?
Majority		57	21.11	−14.77

=== 2021 election ===
Devon and Cornwall Police and Crime Commissioner election, 2021 - Overall results
Party	Candidate	1st round		2nd round			1st round votesTransfer votes, 2nd round
Party	Candidate	Total	Of round	Transfers	Total	Of round	1st round votesTransfer votes, 2nd round
Conservative	Alison Hernandez	247,173	49.97%	28,044	275,217	65.19%	
Labour	Gareth Derrick	99,894	20.20%	47,085	146,979	34.81%	
Liberal Democrats	Brian Blake	88,318	17.86%				
Green	Stuart Jackson	59,242	11.98%				
Turnout		494,627	36.1%				
Rejected ballots		16,101	3.15%				
Total votes		510,381	37.22%				
Conservative hold							

Devon and Cornwall Police and Crime Commissioner election, 2021 - Cornwall only results
Party	Candidate	1st round		2nd round			1st round votesTransfer votes, 2nd round
Party	Candidate	Total	Of round	Transfers	Total	Of round	1st round votesTransfer votes, 2nd round
Conservative	Alison Hernandez	82,302	49.80%	9,951	92,253	66.13%	
Liberal Democrats	Brian Blake	32,221	19.50%				
Labour	Gareth Derrick	30,738	18.60%	16,504	47,242	33.87%	
Green	Stuart Jackson	20,005	12.10%				
Total votes		165,266					

Devon and Cornwall Police and Crime Commissioner election, 2021 - Mid Devon only results
Party	Candidate	1st round		2nd round			1st round votesTransfer votes, 2nd round
Party	Candidate	Total	Of round	Transfers	Total	Of round	1st round votesTransfer votes, 2nd round
Conservative	Alison Hernandez	12,188	51.74%	1,421	13,609	69.61%	
Liberal Democrats	Brian Blake	4,597	19.51%				
Labour	Gareth Derrick	3,695	15.68%	2,246	5,941	30.39%	
Green	Stuart Jackson	3,078	13.07%				
Total votes		23,558					

Devon and Cornwall Police and Crime Commissioner election, 2021 - Plymouth only results
Party	Candidate	1st round		2nd round			1st round votesTransfer votes, 2nd round
Party	Candidate	Total	Of round	Transfers	Total	Of round	1st round votesTransfer votes, 2nd round
Conservative	Alison Hernandez	33,836	50.15%	2,452	36,288	58.05%	
Labour	Gareth Derrick	21,923	32.49%	4,298	26,221	41.95%	
Green	Stuart Jackson	5,888	8.73%				
Liberal Democrats	Brian Blake	5,824	8.63%				
Total votes		67,471					

Devon and Cornwall Police and Crime Commissioner election, 2021 - Torbay only results
Party	Candidate	1st round		2nd round			1st round votesTransfer votes, 2nd round
Party	Candidate	Total	Of round	Transfers	Total	Of round	1st round votesTransfer votes, 2nd round
Conservative	Alison Hernandez	14,422	57.06%	1,538	15,960	73.06%	
Liberal Democrats	Brian Blake	5,505	21.78%				
Labour	Gareth Derrick	3,489	13.81%	2,396	5,885	26.94%	
Green	Stuart Jackson	1,857	7.35%				
Total votes		25,273					

=== 2016 election ===
Devon and Cornwall Police and Crime Commissioner election, 2016
Party	Candidate	1st round		2nd round			1st round votesTransfer votes, 2nd round
Party	Candidate	Total	Of round	Transfers	Total	Of round	1st round votesTransfer votes, 2nd round
Conservative	Alison Hernandez	69,354	24.4%	21,682	91,036	51.1%	
Labour	Gareth Derrick	66,519	23.4%	20,723	87,242	48.9%	
UKIP	Jonathan Smith	49,659	17.5%				
Independent	Bob Spencer	41,382	14.6%				
Liberal Democrats	Richard Younger-Ross	35,154	12.4%				
Independent	William Morris	22,395	7.9%				
Turnout		284,463	22.1%				
Rejected ballots		9,657	3.3%				
Total votes		294,120					
Registered electors							
Conservative hold							
