= Joseph Davidson Sowerby =

Joseph Davidson Sowerby

Joseph Davidson Sowerby was a British Chief Constable, and served in the Plymouth Borough Police from 1892 to 1917.

== Early life, career and family ==
Sowerby was born in Everton, Liverpool in 1863 to Thomas Sowerby and Deborah Davidson, the first of three children. He joined the Leeds Borough Constabulary in 1881, aged 18. Prior to his appointment he was employed as a teacher with the Leeds School Board. By 1891 he had achieved the rank of Chief Inspector and also held the role of Town Clerk. In 1889 he married Francis Stringer Wilson in the district of Wakefield, and together they had four children, Frank, Laurence Wilson, John Reginald and Marjorie Davidson. John did not marry. Marjorie married a man in Plymouth called Beverley and had children. Frank married Gertrude Lamb and had a son, Peter, and resided in Plymouth until his death in 1958. Peter married Hazel Fewings and had two children, Gillian and Owen. They live in Torbay. Laurence married Mabel Sealy Bailey of Bristol and they had 2 children, Marjorie and Betty. Laurence and Mabel moved to Buckfastleigh, South Devon with their two children. Marjorie moved to Dean Coombe and married Clifford Batten. Both died in the 1990s leaving a son, Roderic Dean Batten (wife Jane) who currently lives in the Torquay area. Betty had a daughter and after her mother's death she, Laurence and daughter Lorelie Walton moved to British Columbia, Canada. Laurence remarried briefly; in 1954 Betty remarried and had two sons, Simon and Richard Jeanpierre. Lorelie married William David Metcalfe and lives in North Saanich, British Columbia. Simon and family reside in Victoria, British Columbia, while Richard and family reside in Wyoming, US.

=== The Horsforth Murder ===
On 10 June 1891 Leeds Borough PC William Moss discovered a bundle in an alley next to the police station. On closer inspection the officer noticed it was the body of a female child, approximately 5 years old. Inspector Sowerby was one of the principal investigators, and heard the testimony of Ann Turner, mother of Walter Turner. Walter was said to have brought home an object wrapped in linen and hid it underneath the stairs at their house, telling his mother not to worry about it. He later dumped the body in town next to the police station in Horsforth. The body was horribly mutilated and was covered with a white paste, determined by the coroner Mr J.C. Malcolm to be chloride of lime. Turner had inflicted forty-five stab wounds to the body and continued to mutilate the body after the child had died. The child was quickly identified as Barbara Whitham Waterhouse. Sowerby arrested Walter Turner, and gave evidence in court that led to his conviction and sentencing to death in August 1891. Turner's mother Ann was tried as an accessory to her son's crime but was acquitted. The judge Mr Justice Grantham is noted for giving a scathing closing speech to the court, suggesting that Turner was lucky to be in police custody for he would have been "torn limb from limb" by the townsfolk had he been free to walk. After sentence was passed, Mr Grantham presented a bouquet to the deceased child's mother and was met with rapturous cheering and applause as he left the building.

== Plymouth Borough Police ==
In 1892 Sowerby applied for a Chief Constableship at Worcester Constabulary, and made it to the last six candidates for consideration. He was not successful, and instead applied for the post at Plymouth Borough Police. The Plymouth Police Watch Committee employed Sowerby on a £300 a year salary, and notified Chief Constable of Leeds, Mr F.T. Webb, by telegram that he had been successful in his application. As a token of goodwill his colleagues in Leeds presented Sowerby with a gold keyless watch. As was common at the time, Sowerby was also appointed Chief Fire Officer. Upon moving to Plymouth he took residence at 21 Salisbury Road.

Sowerby made a number of organisational changes to the Plymouth force, including scrapping the one-shilling wage deduction imposed on new police constables from their weekly pay, introduced by the force previously “for fear that he might run away with his uniform.” In doing so he also handed back some £500 to his constables. He also supplied extra oil lamps and handcuffs to his officers, when he discovered that the force was in short supply, leaving some of his men in the unfortunate position of not being able to handcuff violent offenders on arrest. He also introduced women into the Special Constabulary.

In 1894 he was shortlisted for the Chief Constableship of the Bristol City Police, but was not successful. In April 1894 he led a sixty-strong force of police officers conducting raids on betting establishments across Plymouth. He was known for rewarding his officers generously, and in August 1907 Sowerby traveled to London by train with his wife to present Mr F. James, who had just departed the Plymouth Borough Police, with a solid gold English lever watch bearing the inscription "Presented to Mr F. James by the Plymouth Constabulary and friends, on his appointment to the Chief Constableship of Hastings. March, 1907." Mrs Sowerby presented Mrs James with a large silver salver bearing the inscription "Presented to Mrs F. James by members of the Plymouth Police Force and friends, as a token of esteem upon leaving Plymouth. March, 1907." Three years prior Sowerby had presented Mr James with a solid gold double Albert chain with a suitable inscription, upon his promotion to Superintendent in 1904. In December 1907 he was publicly criticised by Reverend Arthur Robinson, who had been arrested for an offence against a woman whilst at church by a Detective Morrish. Through cross-examination it was determined the arrest was wrongful, and Sowerby subsequently wrote him a letter admitting that his officer's actions were wrong. Robinson though was furious that the Chief Constable did not take the opportunity to apologise in his letter, and so took to the press to express his disdain.

Following on from the 1894 betting raids, in September 1912 Sowerby enforced the prohibition of whist drives in the town, a decision which was very unpopular. He was said to have felt indifference towards the change, but had no choice but to enforce the ban due to a recent change in law. In 1909 Sowerby investigated the manslaughter of Plymouth Argyle Football Club trainer Nicholas Arthur Wallis. Professional footballer Mr E. McIntyre was implicated in the crime and it was discovered that McIntyre had left Plymouth and traveled to Newcastle. Sowerby notified the Newcastle police by telegram, leading to his arrest. Sowerby asked his colleague, an Inspector Tucker, to travel to Newcastle and bring McIntyre back to Plymouth.

In December 1913 Sowerby led a contingent of officers to the Plymouth Dockyard to intercept the SS Majestic, which had just arrived from New York. On board was Suffragette Emmeline Pankhurst. Pankhurst was taken into custody and personally escorted to Exeter Gaol by Sowerby.

In 1914 he oversaw the amalgamation of the Stonehouse District and Devonport Borough Police forces with Plymouth, increasing the size of the force significantly.

== Later career ==
Sowerby retired on 31 March 1917. He was succeeded by former Scotland Yard officer, Mr Herbert Hards Sanders. He died 5 July 1919, aged 62. Following his death, his wife Francis moved back to Leeds and died in 1948, aged 84. His son John continued to live in Plymouth for the rest of his life, at 3 Stangray Avenue.
