= Ranulph Bacon =

British police officer (1906–1988)

Lieutenant-Colonel Sir Ranulph Bacon QPM
- Bacon in January 1966.

11th Inspector-General of Police of British Ceylon
- In office 1944–1947
- Preceded by: Gordon Halland
- Succeeded by: Richard Aluwihare

Chief Constable of the Devon County Constabulary
- In office 1947–1961
- Preceded by: Lyndon Morris
- Succeeded by: Robert Greenwood

Personal details
- Born: Ranulph Robert Maunsell Bacon; 6 August 1906 Westgate-on-Sea, Kent
- Died: 30 March 1988 (aged 81)
- Profession: Police officer

Lieutenant-Colonel Sir Ranulph Robert Maunsell Bacon QPM (6 August 1906 – 30 March 1988) was a British police officer.

Bacon was born in Westgate-on-Sea, Kent, and educated at Tonbridge School and Queens' College, Cambridge. He joined the Metropolitan Police as a constable in 1928 and was selected for Hendon Police College in 1934, passing out with the Baton of Honour.

At the outbreak of the Second World War, Bacon was eager to enlist, but was not given permission to do so. Finally in May 1940 he was commissioned into the British Army as a provost marshal on the General List. By December 1941, when he was mentioned in despatches for his service in the Western Desert, he held the local rank of major, although his substantive rank was lieutenant. He was later promoted to lieutenant-colonel and in 1942 was appointed deputy provost marshal of the Ninth Army.

In November 1943, he was seconded to the Colonial Police Service as deputy inspector-general of the Ceylon Police, and was promoted to inspector-general in 1944. His deputy inspector-general was John Waldron, another Hendon graduate who was later to succeed him as both assistant commissioner "A" and deputy commissioner of the Metropolitan Police.

In 1947, he returned to Britain as chief constable of the Devon County Constabulary, and held the post until his appointment as assistant commissioner "A" (operations and administration) of the Metropolitan Police on 1 November 1961. He was awarded the King's Police and Fire Services Medal in the 1953 New Year Honours. In 1963, he was appointed assistant commissioner "C" (crime), in charge of the Criminal Investigation Department. At a press conference on 31 December 1964, he urged the public to "have a go" if they saw an armed robbery taking place, which was criticised as irresponsible by many. He was knighted in the 1966 New Year Honours.

In 1966, he briefly served as deputy commissioner, from 8 April to his retirement in October.

== Footnotes ==
Police appointments
Preceded by Unknown	Deputy Inspector-General of Police of Ceylon; 1943–1944	Succeeded by John Waldron
Preceded by Gordon Halland	Inspector-General of Police of Ceylon; 1944–1947	Succeeded by Richard Aluwihare
Preceded by Lyndon Morris	Chief Constable of Devon; 1947–1961	Succeeded by Robert Greenwood
Preceded by Douglas Webb	Assistant Commissioner "A", Metropolitan Police; 1961–1963	Succeeded by Sir John Waldron
Preceded by Sir Joe Jackson	Assistant Commissioner "C", Metropolitan Police; 1963–1966	Succeeded by Peter Brodie
Preceded by Douglas Webb	Deputy Commissioner of Police of the Metropolis; 1966	Succeeded by Sir John Waldron
