= Museum of Policing in Devon and Cornwall =

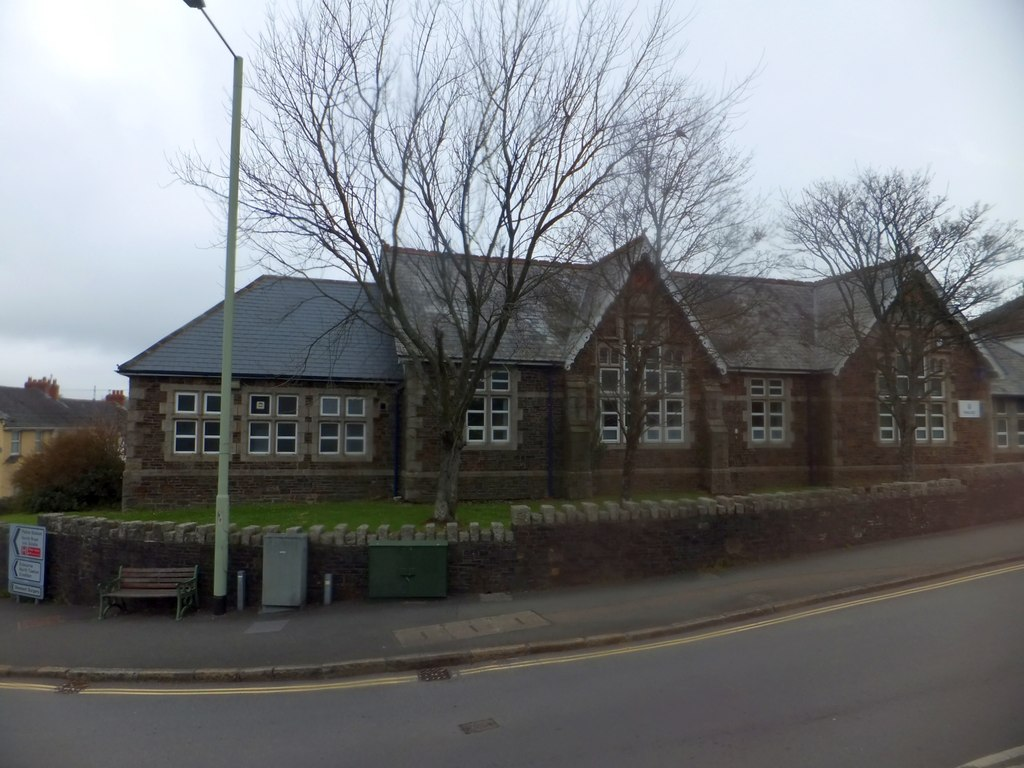
- Okehampton Police Station
- Established: 2016
- Location: Okehampton Police Station, Okehampton, England
- Coordinates: 50.7397°N 3.9956°W
- Type: Police Museum
- Collections: Uniforms; Equipment; Photographs; Archives
- Website: www.dcpolicingmuseum.co.uk

The Museum of Policing in Devon and Cornwall (MOPIDAC) is a registered charity that collects, preserves and celebrates the history of policing in Devon and Cornwall. The museum possesses a comprehensive collection of artefacts and archives that relate to Devon and Cornwall Police and its antecedent forces that include the Devon County Constabulary and Cornwall County Constabulary and date back to the earliest days of policing. The archives contain many records relating to police officers who served and is of particular interest to genealogists.

Active collecting of police material in the Devon and Cornwall area began in the 1970s. Police Constable Brian Estill was concerned that there was no heritage policy within the force. Estill saved items from skips, and worked to establish a formal heritage collection.

The museum is located in the Court Gate building

The museum's collection of objects are stored at Okehampton Police Station while the archive materials are located at the Devon Heritage Centre. The collection at Okehampton can be toured by appointment only, open public access is provided seasonally through a mini-museum located within Tavistock's Court Gate building.

== Gallery ==
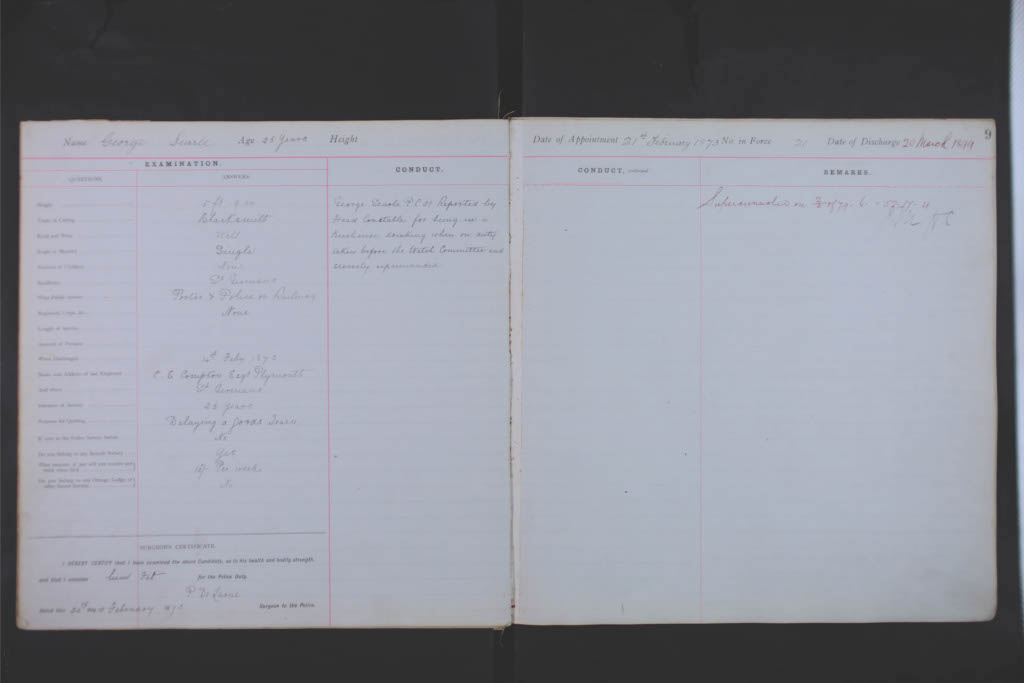
Devonport Borough Police Register. Police Force, Devonport, 1862-1914

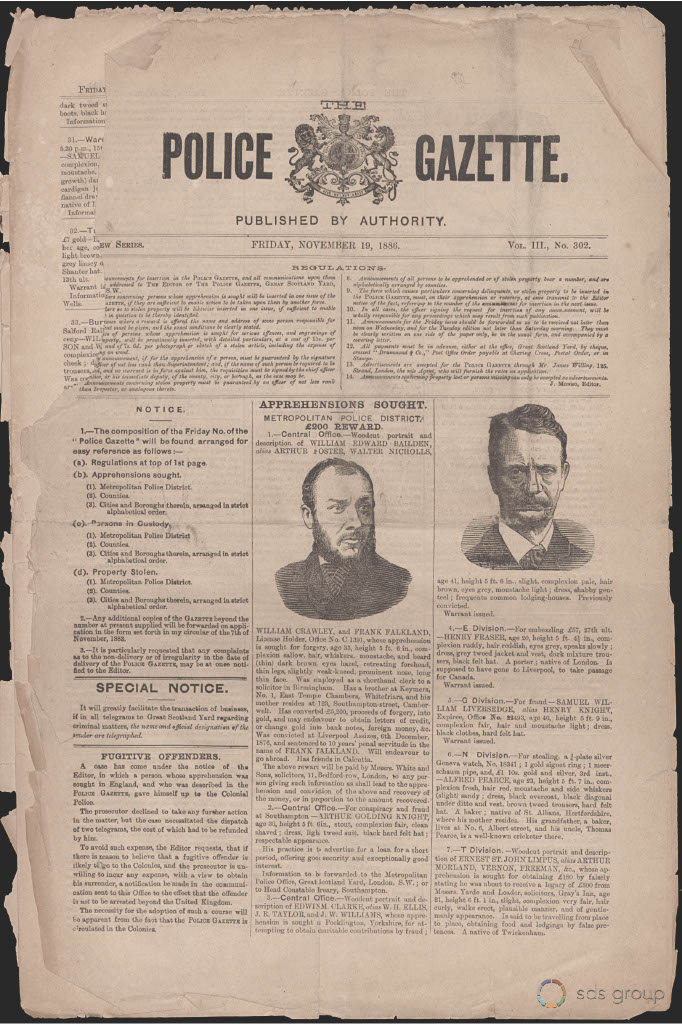
Bound volume of "Police Gazette"

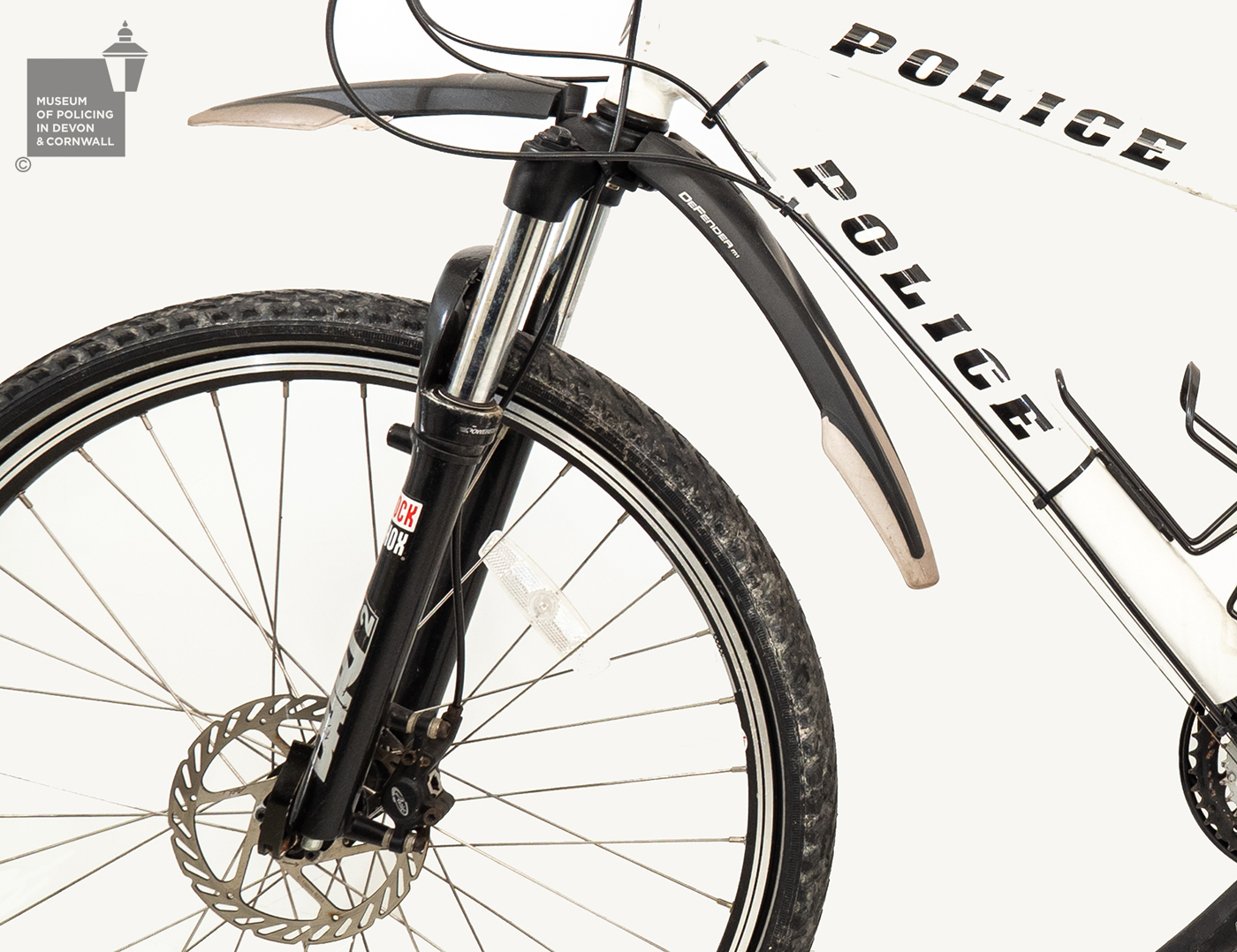
Police Patrol Bicycle

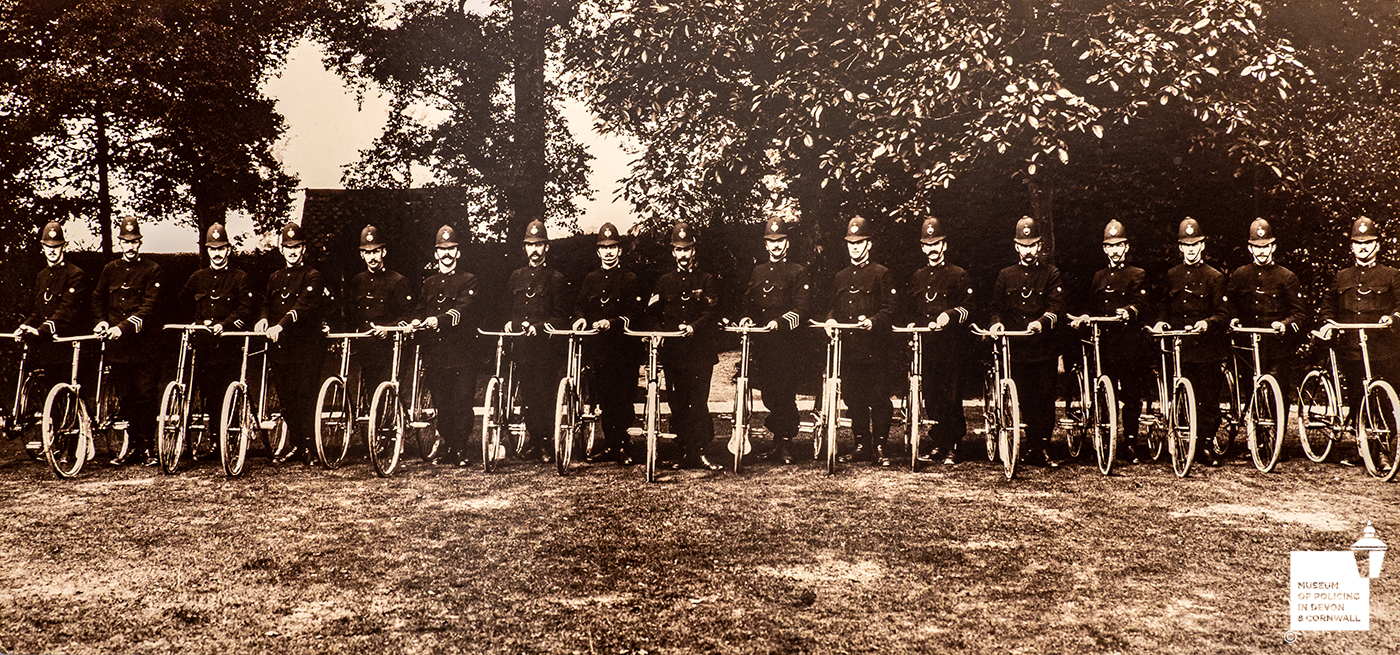
Reproduction of old photograph of policemen with bicycles. Seventeen Cornish police officers of various ranks with their bikes in, 1913

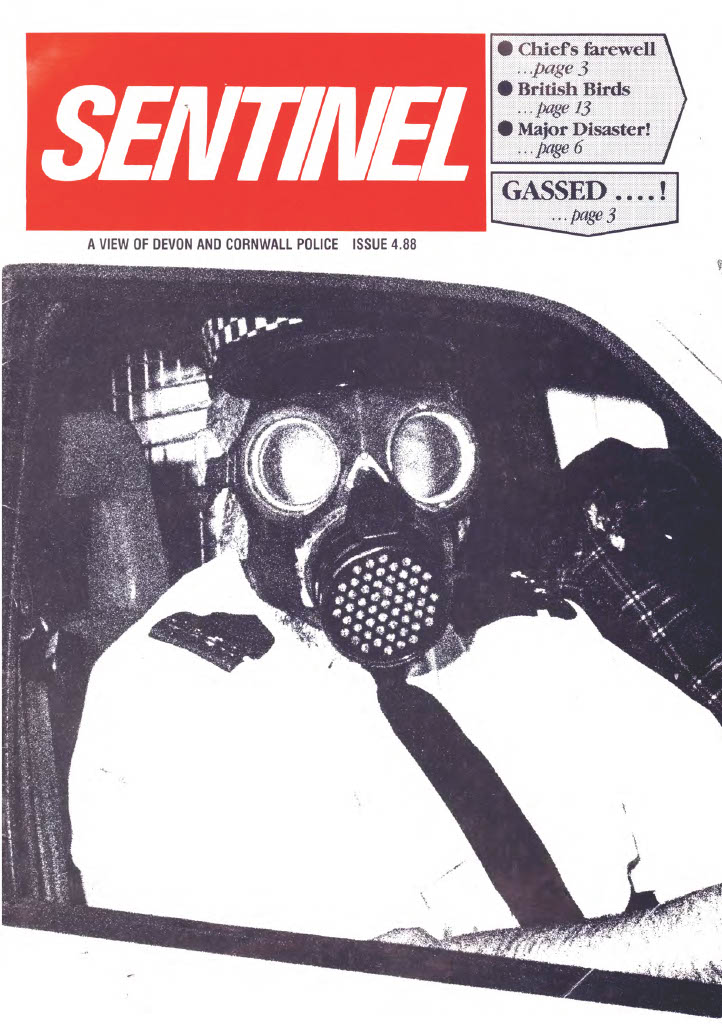
'Sentinel' magazine issue 4.88 (04.12.1988) which gives an overview of the Devon and Cornwall Police
