= Tony Hogg =

Commodore Tony Hogg AFC
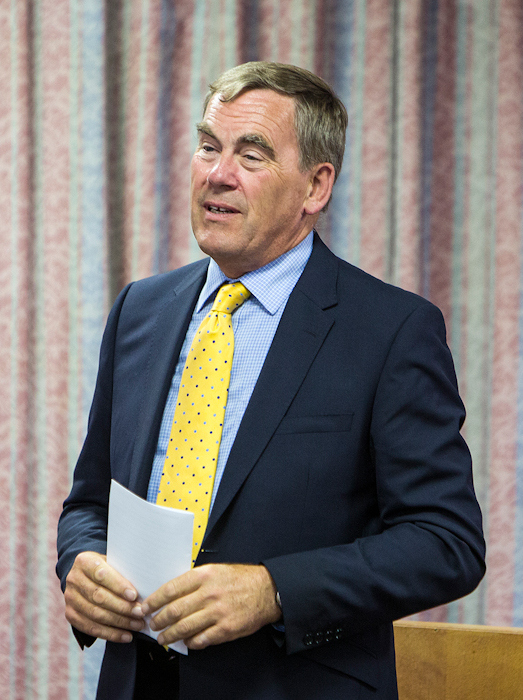

Devon and Cornwall Police and Crime Commissioner
- In office 22 November 2012 – 11 May 2016
- Preceded by: Office created
- Succeeded by: Alison Hernandez

Personal details
- Party: Conservative
- Awards: Air Force Cross

Military service
- Allegiance: United Kingdom
- Branch/service: Royal Navy
- Years of service: 1968-2000
- Rank: Commodore
- Commands: Commanding Officer of RNAS Culdrose; HMS Chatham; HMS Charybdis; HMS Diomede; 820 Naval Air Squadron; 826 Naval Air Squadron; HMS Iveston; HMS Upton
- Battles/wars: Cod War; Falklands War

Commodore Anthony John Marsden Hogg AFC is a British former military officer who served as the Devon and Cornwall Police and Crime Commissioner (PCC), representing the Conservative Party. He was the first person to hold the post and was elected on 15 November 2012.

== Early life ==
He was educated at Cheltenham College.

== Career ==
=== Military service ===
Hogg joined the Royal Navy after completing his A-levels. He received his officer training at Britannia Royal Naval College in Dartmouth, Devon. His commission was confirmed on 1 September 1972 and he was granted the rank of sub lieutenant with seniority from 1 September 1970. He was promoted to lieutenant on 16 September 1973. Hogg's subsequent career involved a mix of helicopter and ship command postings and work in the Ministry of Defence including the role of appointer for the Fleet Air Arm and Director Naval Operations, aviation.

=== Subsequent career ===
Hogg joined Westland Helicopters, later AgustaWestland, in 2000 immediately after leaving the Royal Navy. His role was as one of three Defence Advisers advising the Westand Board in interaction with a primary customer the Royal Navy and wider Ministry Of Defence.

In 2007, Hogg returned to Cornwall to take up the position as Chief Executive of a local charity in Cornwall: BF Adventure, which employed outdoor adventure to build confidence, life skills and improved behaviour in some of Cornwall's disadvantaged young people. He left that post in 2011.

=== Police and crime commissioner ===
Hogg was elected as PCC on 15 November 2012. He resigned from the Conservative Party in April 2016 in protest at the lack of government publicity given to the second round of elections for the post. He was succeeded by Alison Hernandez on 6 May 2016.

== Personal life ==
Hogg is married to Chrissie. Together they have two children: Simon and Max. They live in Helston, Cornwall.

== Honours and decorations ==
Air Force Cross	(1978)

An Air Force Cross was awarded for the rescue of crew from the Grimsby trawler Ben Asdale. Hogg was the primary pilot of a Royal Navy Sea King rescue helicopter of 706 Naval Air Squadron on the night of 30 December 1978.
