= Maria Wallis =

Maria Wallis QPM
- Born: August 13, 1955; County Fermanagh, Ireland
- Education: Bristol University
- Occupation: Constable

Maria Wallis (born 13 August 1955) was the chief constable of the Devon and Cornwall Constabulary in the United Kingdom from 2002 until 26 July 2006. A native of County Fermanagh, she commanded the Devon and Cornwall Constabulary which included responsibility for 3,500 police officers, more than 2,000 civilian staff and 362 police community support officers. Wallis commanded the largest geographical police area in England, extending 180 miles from the Dorset and Somerset borders in the east to the Isles of Scilly in the west.

== Career ==
Wallis joined the Metropolitan Police as a constable in 1976 after graduating from Bristol University with a degree in Social Administration and Sociology.

Prior to her service with Devon and Cornwall Constabulary, Wallis served with the Metropolitan Police Service for 18 years undertaking various roles including working at the Community Relations Policy Unit at New Scotland Yard as a chief inspector, with responsibility for developing policies on domestic violence and racial attacks, as well as working as a Detective Superintendent in South East London.

She became the deputy chief constable of Sussex where Wallis was awarded the Queen's Police Medal (QPM) in January 2002. At the time Wallis was short-listed to head the Police Service of Northern Ireland (PSNI) in her native Northern Ireland, but withdrew following her promotion to Devon and Cornwall.

As chief constable of the Devon and Cornwall Constabulary, Wallis presided over the fourth largest reduction in crime out of all the police force areas of the UK in 2005–2006. Attempts at controlling overtime costs and the implementing labour study recommendations brought undue criticism on Chief Constable Wallis. Mass protest arose from the attempt to implement recommendations of a position regrading study. The evaluation was a re-grading exercise which was meant to ensure fair pay for all, but meant some faced pay cuts of up to £8,000 causing hundreds to protest.

== Retirement ==
Wallis retired in July 2006. In announcing her retirement, Wallis added that the last two months had also been very challenging personally as well as professionally because her mother had died the previous month and her father subsequently was unwell. She said she had always put the needs of the force first and was "enormously proud of the achievements of our staff, in particular the recent excellent performance".

On the day of her retirement, Association of Chief Police Officers of England, Wales & Northern Ireland (ACPO) President Ken Jones said:

“I would like to express my heartfelt thanks and support to Maria Wallis who has dedicated many years to the police service and has been outstanding in her contribution to the national work of ACPO as well as to the forces in which she has served. It is the job of a chief constable to raise performance and drive down crime, both of which have been achieved under the leadership of Maria. Nationally, Maria, on behalf of all chief constables, has spearheaded key criminal justice reforms and led the service through the development of Local Criminal Justice Boards. She has helped improve services for victims and witnesses and seen through significant changes to the charging regime. Her departure is a great loss to the service and she will be very much missed”.
