= Lyndon Henry Morris =

Lyndon Henry Morris

Lyndon Henry Morris CBE, MC, DL (1889–1946) was a British chief constable and veteran of the First World War.

== Early life ==
Morris was born in Bakewell, Derbyshire, in 1889. He was the son of Reverend Ernest Edwin Morris, the vicar of Ashbourne and Deacon of Durham in the Southwell Cathedral, and Josephine Anna Bolton. As a young man he studied as a solicitor, and later decided to join the army, first serving with the Territorials as a regular and later as a captain in the 4th Battalion King's Shropshire Light Infantry. He rose through the ranks to lead the 1st Battalion with the rank of lieutenant-colonel. In 1914 he married Phyllis Hawkins, and with her had a son and two daughters. Morris had three brothers, Ernest Jr, Francis and Noah, and two sisters, Ruth and Mary.

== First World War ==
Morris led the 1st Battalion King's Shropshire Light Infantry from 1914 to 1920, serving in Ireland, France and China. For distinguished service he received the M.C. He retired from the Army in 1921.

== Interwar years ==
After retiring from the Army, Morris moved to Florida, US, and engaged in a fruit-farming business for two years.

== Prison service ==
On his return to England, Morris entered the prison service, first becoming deputy governor of Brixton Prison and later governor of Birmingham and Camp Hill Prisons. In 1923 he became governor of Exeter Prison and in 1931 became governor of Dartmoor Prison. He was highly regarded by his staff and superiors, the prison commissioners, and made a number of important changes to each of the prisons he governed. Notably he also garnered the respect of the inmates, and in 1932 was instrumental in calming disorder that had broken out at Dartmoor Prison (he was chief constable by this time, and had attended with a large contingent of officers from the Devon County Constabulary and Plymouth City Police.)

== Devon County Constabulary ==
His position in the Prison Service put Morris in close contact with the Devon, Cornwall and Somerset Constabularies, and in 1931 decided to pursue a career in the police. Morris was appointed chief constable of the Devon County Constabulary on 11 February 1931 succeeding Captain Herbert Reginald Vyvyan, who had retired from the force. He was the successful candidate out of 133 applicants, with applications registered as far as Sudan, Kenya and France. The Devon Standing Joint Committee whittled down the large number of hopefuls to only three, with Morris beating Mr Freeman Newton, Chief Constable of Herefordshire, and Captain J.C.T. Rivett-Carnac, Chief Constable of Huntingdonshire and the Isle of Ely. As was custom with military officers who became Chief Constables, Morris retained his military title, and was referred to as Major throughout his tenure. As with his previous role, he introduced important changes to the police force, including scrapping the vetting of women his constables intended to marry. Devon did not have a CID when Morris was appointed, and one of his first tasks was the introduction of such a department. He was appointed Deputy Lieutenant for Devon in 1932, and in 1939 was awarded the King's Police Medal.

In October 1931, Morris was a passenger in a patrol car which collided with 19 year old cyclist Alfred Francis Edgcombe on the main Totnes to Plymouth road. The car was being driven by Constable Frederick H. Hammond, who hit the cyclist at 20 mph, killing him outright. At a subsequent inquest, the layout of the road was determined to have been a significant factor, with recommendations made that proper lines and signage be laid down. The inquest heard that Constable Hammond had done everything in his power to avoid the cyclist, and no charges were brought.

== Second World War ==
Morris was the County ARP Controller during the Second World War. In 1944 he was appointed a CBE.

== Later career and death ==
Morris lived with his wife at Mile End, Countess Wear, Exeter. After the Second World War, his health began to decline. On 31 October 1946 he underwent an operation at the Royal Devon & Exeter Hospital. By 7 November his condition worsened despite previous good progress, and he died aged 57.
