= Alison Hernandez =

British politician

Devon and Cornwall Police and Crime Commissioner
- Incumbent
- Assumed office 12 May 2016
- Preceded by: Tony Hogg

Personal details
- Party: Independent (4 Jan 2026 - present); Conservative (May 2016 - 4 Jan 2026)

Alison Selina Hernandez is an Independent British politician, and the current Police and Crime Commissioner for Devon and Cornwall.

== Political career ==
=== Police and Crime Commissioner for Devon and Cornwall - 1st term ===
Hernandez was elected as Police and Crime Commissioner for Devon and Cornwall, representing the Conservative Party, on 5 May 2016, succeeding Tony Hogg.

Within days of her election, it was reported that Hernandez was being investigated by police over allegations she failed to properly declare election expenses that were submitted in her role as an election agent for Kevin Foster, Conservative candidate in the Torbay constituency during the 2015 general election. Hernandez was under investigation by the Independent Police Complaints Commission which is managing the probe by West Mercia Police in connection with the United Kingdom general election, 2015 party spending investigation. She faced calls from opposition politicians, including Plymouth City Council leader Tudor Evans, to step aside from the role of Police and Crime Commissioner while the investigation was ongoing. Hernandez addressed these concerns during her swearing in ceremony on 10 May: "I've had over 91,000 people elect me to office. I'm here for the people of Devon and Cornwall and the Isles of Scilly. I'm here to do a job – the police need support."

The Independent Police Complaints Commission referred the matter to the Crown Prosecution Service in April 2017. They ruled on 10 May 2017 that there were no grounds for a criminal charge and the case was dropped.

Hernandez courted controversy in June 2017 when she suggested gun owners could engage with terrorists. This idea was swiftly dismissed by Deputy Chief Constable Paul Netherton due to the complexities of responding to such an incident and the confusion that may occur in identifying the attackers.

=== Police and Crime Commissioner for Devon and Cornwall - 2nd and 3rd terms ===
Hernandez was re-elected, again as a Conservative, in 2021 and 2024. In 2026 she left the Conservative Party.

== Private life ==
In February 2019 Hernandez revealed that she had been caught speeding, and had received a parking ticket.

== Electoral record ==
Devon and Cornwall Police and Crime Commissioner election, 2016
| Party | Candidate | 1st round | | 2nd round | | | 1st round votesTransfer votes, 2nd round |
| Party | Candidate | Total | Of round | Transfers | Total | Of round | 1st round votesTransfer votes, 2nd round |
|---|---|---|---|---|---|---|---|
| Conservative | Alison Hernandez | 69,354 | 24.4% | 21,682 | 91,036 | 51.1% | |
| Labour | Gareth Derrick | 66,519 | 23.4% | 20,723 | 87,242 | 48.9% | |
| UKIP | Jonathan Smith | 49,659 | 17.5% | | | | |
| Independent | Bob Spencer | 41,382 | 14.6% | | | | |
| Liberal Democrats | Richard Younger-Ross | 35,154 | 12.4% | | | | |
| Independent | William Morris | 22,395 | 7.9% | | | | |
| Turnout | | 284,463 | 22.1% | | | | |
| Rejected ballots | | 9,657 | 3.3% | | | | |
| Total votes | | 294,120 | | | | | |
| Registered electors | | | | | | | |
| Conservative hold | | | | | | | |

Devon and Cornwall Police and Crime Commissioner election, 2021
| Party | Candidate | 1st round | | 2nd round | | | 1st round votesTransfer votes, 2nd round |
| Party | Candidate | Total | Of round | Transfers | Total | Of round | 1st round votesTransfer votes, 2nd round |
|---|---|---|---|---|---|---|---|
| Conservative | Alison Hernandez* | 247,173 | 49.97% | 28,044 | 275,217 | 65.19% | |
| Labour | Gareth Derrick | 99,894 | 20.20% | 47,085 | 146,979 | 34.81% | |
| Liberal Democrats | Brian Blake | 88,318 | 17.86% | | | | |
| Green | Stuart Paul Jackson | 59,242 | 11.98% | | | | |
| Turnout | | 494,627 | | | | | |
| Conservative hold | | | | | | | |

Devon and Cornwall Police and Crime Commissioner election, 2024
| Party | Candidate | Votes | % | ±% |
|---|---|---|---|---|
| Conservative | Alison Hernandez* | 131,764 | 43.3 | −6.7 |
| Labour Co-op | Daniel Steel | 107,897 | 35.4 | +15.2 |
| Liberal Democrats | Steve Lodge | 64,790 | 21.3 | +3.4 |
| Turnout | | 304,451 | 22.5 | −13.6 |
| Conservative hold | | Swing | -21.9 | |
