= 1968 New Year Honours =

British royal recognitions

The New Year Honours 1968 were appointments in many of the Commonwealth realms of Queen Elizabeth II to various orders and honours to reward and highlight good works by citizens of those countries. They were announced in supplements to the London Gazette of 29 December 1967 to celebrate the year passed and mark the beginning of 1968.

At this time honours for Australians were awarded both in the United Kingdom honours, on the advice of the premiers of Australian states, and also in a separate Australia honours list.

The recipients of honours are displayed here as they were styled before their new honour, and arranged by honour, with classes (Knight, Knight Grand Cross, etc.) and then divisions (Military, Civil, etc.) as appropriate.

== United Kingdom and Commonwealth ==
=== Life Peers ===
Barons

- The Honourable William Michael Berry, MBE, TD, Chairman and Editor-in-Chief of The Daily Telegraph.
- Sir William Henry (Harry) Pilkington, Chairman, Pilkington Brothers, Ltd. Chancellor, Loughborough University of Technology since 1966. Chairman, National Advisory Council for Education for Industry and Commerce since 1956.
- Thomas Johnston Taylor, President, Scottish Co-operative Wholesale Society, Ltd. Member, Forestry Commission.
- Sir Humphrey Trevelyan, GCMG, CIE, OBE. Lately High Commissioner for Aden and the Protectorate of South Arabia.
- Lewis Tatham Wright, CBE, Chairman, Trades Union Congress. General Secretary, Amalgamated Weavers' Association.

=== Privy Counsellors ===
- The Right Honourable Frank, Baron Beswick, Captain of the Gentlemen-at-Arms, Parliamentary Under-Secretary of State for Commonwealth Affairs, 1965-July 1967.
- The Right Honourable Hugh Mackintosh Foot, Baron Caradon, GCMG, KCVO, OBE, Minister of State for Foreign Affairs. Permanent United Kingdom Representative at the United Nations since 1964.
- Roy Mason, MP. Member of Parliament for Barnsley since 1953. Minister of State, Board of Trade, 1964-1967. Minister of Defence for Equipment since 1967.

=== Knights Bachelor ===
- His Honour Judge Carl Douglas Aarvold, OBE, TD, Recorder of the City of London.
- Colonel Michael Picton Ansell, CBE, DSO, DL. For services to British Show Jumping.
- Rowland Baker, OBE, Technical Director, Ministry of Defence (Royal Navy).
- Oliver Charles Barnett, CBE, QC, Judge Advocate General of HM Forces.
- John Dykes Bower, CVO. Lately Organist, St. Paul's Cathedral.
- Herbert Archbold Brechin, CBE, Lord Provost of Edinburgh.
- David Brown, Chairman, The David Brown Corporation Ltd. For services to Export.
- Thomas Kingsley Collett, CBE. For services to the City of London, and to Export.
- Air Commodore Louis Walter Dickens, DFC, AFC, DL, Chairman, Berkshire County Council.
- Professor Godfrey Rolles Driver, CBE, MC. For services to Hebrew and Biblical Studies.
- Lovedin George Thomas Farmer, Director, Leyland Motor Corporation Ltd. For services to Export.
- Reginald Eustace Goodwin, CBE, DL, Councillor, Greater London Council.
- Harold John Boyer Harding. For services to Civil Engineering.
- Frank Wild Holdsworth, MCh, FRCS, Orthopaedic Surgeon, United Sheffield Hospitals.
- Olliver William Humphreys, CBE. For services to the Electronics Industry.
- Brynmor Jones, Vice-Chancellor, University of Hull.
- Percy Lord, Chief Education Officer, Lancashire County Council.
- Arthur Lionel Pugh Norrington, JP, Chairman, Advisory Committee of English Language Book Society, and for services to Export.
- Harry Robertson Page, City Treasurer of Manchester.
- Alan Sterling Parkes, CBE. Formerly Mary Marshall Professor of the Physiology of Reproduction, University of Cambridge.
- Colonel Derek Wilbraham Pritchard, Chairman, British National Export Council. For services to Export.
- James Anderson Robertson, CBE, Chief Constable, City of Glasgow Police.
- Athelstan Jack Scamp, JP, DL, Chairman, Motor Industry Joint Labour Council.
- Alexander Abel Smith, TD, Deputy Chairman, British National Export Council for Europe. Managing Director J. Henry Schroeder Wagg and Company Ltd. For services to Export.
- Arthur Henry Smith, Chairman, United Africa Company, Ltd. Director, Unilever Ltd. Chairman, African Committee, British National Exports Council. For services to Export.
- Francis John Stratton, CBE, Chairman, Fatstock Marketing Corporation Ltd.
- Harold Warris Thompson, CBE, Professor of Chemistry, University of Oxford. Foreign Secretary, Royal Society.
- John Edward Wall, OBE, Deputy Chairman, Post Office Board.
- Frederick Edward Warner, Senior Partner, Cremer & Warner. For services to the chemical engineering profession.
- William James Percival Webber, CBE. For services to Industrial Relations.

Diplomatic Service and Overseas List

- Louis Cools-Lartigue, OBE, Governor, Dominica.
- Allen Montgomery Lewis, QC, Chief Justice of the West Indies Associated States Supreme Court.
- Ian Graham Turbott, CMG, CVO, Governor, Grenada.

State of New South Wales

- Philip Belmont Charley. For services to primary industry.
- Erik Langker, OBE. For services to the Arts.
- Colonel The Honourable Hector Joseph Richard Clayton, ED. For services to the State and to commerce.

State of Victoria

- Brigadier William Henry Hall, CBE, DSO, ED. For services to the welfare of ex-servicemen and their dependents.
- The Honourable George Augustus Pape, Justice of the Supreme Court of the State of Victoria.

State of Queensland

- Abraham Fryberg, MBE, MB, BS. For services in the fields of medicine and public health.
- William Alan Thompson Summerville. Agent-General for the State of Queensland in London.

State of Western Australia

- The Honourable Henry Keith Watson. For public services.

=== Order of the Bath ===
==== Knights Grand Cross of the Order of the Bath (GCB) ====
Military Division

Royal Navy

- Admiral Sir Michael Le Fanu, KCB, DSC.

Army

- General Sir Geoffrey H. Baker, KCB, CMG, CBE, MC (50806), late Royal Regiment of Artillery, Colonel Commandant, Royal Regiment of Artillery.

Royal Air Force

- Air Chief Marshal Sir John Davis, KCB, OBE, ADC.

Civil Division

- Lieutenant-Colonel The Right Honourable Sir Michael Edward Adeane, GCVO, KCB, Private Secretary to The Queen.
- Sir Burke St John Trend, KCB, CVO, Secretary of the Cabinet.

==== Knights Commander of the Order of the Bath (KCB) ====
Military Division

Royal Navy

- Vice-Admiral Ian Leslie Trower Hogg, CB, DSC.
- Vice-Admiral Charles Piercy Mills, CB, CBE, DSC.

Army

- Major-General Mervyn Andrew Haldane Butler, CB, CBE, DSO, MC (58152), late Infantry, Colonel Commandant, The Parachute Regiment.
- Lieutenant-General Walter Colyear Walker, CB, CBE, DSO (380258), late Infantry, Colonel, 7th Duke of Edinburgh's Own Gurkha Rifles.

Royal Air Force

- Acting Air Marshal Peter Carteret Fletcher, CB, OBE, DFC, AFC.

Civil Division

- Louis Petch, CB, Second Secretary, HM Treasury.
- David Radford Serpell, CB, CMG, OBE, Second Permanent Secretary, Board of Trade.

==== Companions of the Order of the Bath (CB) ====
Military Division

Royal Navy

- Rear-Admiral Peter William Beckwith Ashmore, MVO, DSC.
- Instructor Rear-Admiral Albert John Bellamy, OBE.
- Surgeon Rear-Admiral Eric Blackburn Bradbury, QHP, MB, Bch.
- Rear-Admiral Kenneth Hayden Farnhill, OBE.
- Rear-Admiral Peter Cecil Gibson.
- Surgeon Rear-Admiral Dudley Plunket Gurd, QHS, MD, Mch.
- The Venerable Archdeacon Christopher Prior, QHC.
- Rear-Admiral Robert George Raper.

Army

- Major-General Douglas Lyall Darling, DSO, MC (63638), late Infantry.
- Major-General Anthony Henry George Dobson, OBE, MC (52585), late Corps of Royal Engineers (now retired).
- Major-General John Primrose Douglas, OBE, QHS, MB (58983), late Royal Army Medical Corps.
- Major-General David Boswell Egerton, OBE, MC (63503), late Royal Regiment of Artillery.
- Major-General The Honourable Michael Fitzalan-Howard, CBE, MVO, MC (71887), late Foot Guards, Colonel, The Lancashire Regiment (Prince of Wales's Volunteers).
- Major-General Richard Keith-Jones, MBE, MC (62519), late Royal Regiment of Artillery.
- Major-General Christopher Mark Morrice Man, OBE, MC (63924), late Infantry, Deputy Colonel, The Queen's Regiment (Middlesex).

Royal Air Force

- Air Vice-Marshal Alan Hunter Cachemaille Boxer, DSO, DFC.
- Air Vice-Marshal Anthony Wilkinson Heward, OBE, DFC, AFC.
- Air Vice-Marshal Michael Dillon Lyne, AFC.
- Air Vice-Marshal William Gwyn Morgan, CBE.
- Air Vice-Marshal Bruce Robinson, CBE, (Retired).
- Air Commodore Frederick Beresford Sowrey, CBE, AFC.

Civil Division

- Eric Walter Dean, CBE, Principal Assistant Solicitor, Board of Trade.
- William James Glenn, Chief Civil Engineer, Ministry of Public Building and Works.
- Captain Michael Hodges, OBE, Royal Navy (Retired). Lately Under Secretary, Cabinet Office.
- Peter Howard Jones, Assistant Under-secretary of State, Ministry of Defence (Royal Navy).
- Ronald Robert Duncan McIntosh, Deputy Under-Secretary of State, Department of Economic Affairs.
- Ieuan Maddock, OBE, Controller of Industrial Technology, Ministry of Technology.
- Robert Braithwaite Marshall, MBE, Deputy Secretary, Ministry of Power.
- Evan Walter Maude, Economic Minister in Washington and Head of United Kingdom Treasury and Supply Delegation.
- Alan Derrett Neale, MBE, Second Secretary, Board of Trade.
- William Dennis Pile, MBE, Deputy Under-Secretary of State, Home Office.
- John Watkins-Pitchford, MD, BS, Chief Medical Officer, Ministry of Social Security.
- William John Thompson, Comptroller and Auditor-General, Northern Ireland.
- Edward Howsley Watson, Solicitor and Legal Adviser, Ministry of Housing and Local Government and the Ministry of Health.

=== Order of Saint Michael and Saint George ===
==== Knight Grand Cross of the Order of St Michael and St George (GCMG) ====
Diplomatic Service and Overseas List

- Sir Francis Brian Anthony Rundall, KCMG, OBE, lately Her Majesty's Ambassador Extraordinary and Plenipotentiary at Tokyo.

==== Knights Commander of the Order of St Michael and St George (KCMG) ====
- Harold Leslie Bowes, Chairman, Latin American Committee, British National Export Council.

Diplomatic Service and Overseas List

- Thomas Brimelow, CMG, OBE, Her Majesty's Ambassador Extraordinary and Plenipotentiary at Warsaw.
- Frederick Charles Everson, CMG, Minister (Economic), Her Majesty's Embassy, Paris.
- Donald Charles Hopson, CMG, DSO, MC, TD, British Chargé d'Affaires, Peking.
- Michael Sanigear Williams, CMG, Her Majesty's Envoy Extraordinary and Minister Plenipotentiary, Holy See.
- The Right Reverend John Leonard Wilson, CMG, Lord Bishop of Birmingham. Prelate of the Most Distinguished Order of Saint Michael and Saint George.

==== Companions of the Order of St Michael and St George (CMG) ====
- Professor John Howard Middlemiss, MD, MRCP, Director of Radiodiagnostic Department, United Bristol Hospitals and Member of Medical Advisory Committee of the Ministry of Overseas Development.
- Graham McIntosh Patrick, DSC, Assistant Secretary, Ministry of Public Building and Works.
- Edward Thomas William Swaine, MBE, Director, Exhibitions Division, Central Office of Information.
- William Denison Clare Wiggins, OBE, Director of Overseas (Geodetic and Topographic) Surveys, Ministry of Overseas Development.

Diplomatic Service and Overseas List

- Ronald Arculus, Deputy Consul-General, Washington.
- Norman Aspin, Counsellor and Head of Chancery, Her Majesty's Embassy, Tel Aviv.
- Hugh Glencairn Balfour-Paul, Deputy Political Resident, Bahrain.
- Arthur Joseph Boase, OBE, FRCS, Warden of the St. John Ophthalmic Hospital, Jerusalem.
- Stanley George Burt-Andrews, MBE, lately Her Majesty's Consul-General, St. Louis.
- John Horace Ragnar Colvin, lately Her Majesty's Consul-General, Hanoi.
- Professor Zelman Cowen, lately Dominion Liaison Officer, Australia.
- Percy Cradock, Counsellor and Head of Chancery, Office of the British Chargé d'Affaires, Peking.
- George Roy Denman, lately Assistant Secretary, United Kingdom Delegation to General Agreement on Tariffs and Trade, Geneva.
- Edward Caston Eates, MVO, Deputy Commissioner of Police, Hong Kong.
- John Edgar Galsworthy, lately Counsellor (Economic), Her Majesty's Embassy, Bonn.
- Hywel George, OBE, Administrator, Saint Vincent.
- Reginald Hugh Hickling, lately Legal Adviser, British High Commission, Aden.
- Edward Foster James, OBE, Foreign Office.
- Patrick John Keen, MBE, Foreign Office.
- Athelstan Charles Ethelwulf Long, CBE, Chief Secretary and Deputy Queen's Commissioner, Swaziland.
- John Vincent Prendergast, CBE, GM, lately Director of Intelligence, British High Commission, Aden.
- Kenneth Gordon Ritchie, lately Deputy British High Commissioner, Lusaka.

State of New South Wales

- Lieutenant Colonel George Edward Colvin, DSO, ED. For services to the community.

State of Victoria

- Thomas Symington Carlyon, OBE. For services to Horse Racing.

State of Western Australia

- John Archibald Simpson, MB, FRCS, ED. For services in the field of heart surgery.

=== Royal Victorian Order ===
==== Dame Commander of the Royal Victorian Order (DCVO) ====
- Lady Mary Rachel Pepys, CVO.

==== Knights Commander of the Royal Victorian Order (KCVO) ====
- Major Michael Babington Charles Hawkins, CVO, MBE.
- The Right Reverend Michael Gresford Jones, DD.
- Captain Cecil Charles Boyd Rochfort, CVO.

==== Commanders of the Royal Victorian Order (CVO) ====
- Thomas Wood Chasser, Chief Constable, Scottish North-Eastern Counties Constabulary.
- Brigadier John Norman Cheney, OBE.
- Frederick Robert Gansel Chew.
- The Reverend Ronald William Vernon Selby Wright, TD, DD.
- Robert Christopher Mackworth-Young, MVO.

==== Members of the Royal Victorian Order, 4th class (MVO) ====
At this time the two lowest classes of the Royal Victorian Order were "Member (fourth class)" and "Member (fifth class)", both with post-nominal letters MVO. "Member (fourth class)" was renamed "Lieutenant" (LVO) from the 1985 New Year Honours onwards.

- Commander George Anderson, Royal Navy.
- Reginald Wilfrid Barrow.
- Harold Antony Craxton.
- Angus Thow MacKnight, MB, ChB.
- Charles John Mulso Purvis.
- Squadron Leader James Anthony George Ross, (582112), Royal Air Force.
- Alice Lalage Mary Veronica Saxby, MVO.
- Robert Lionel Whitby.

==== Members of the Royal Victorian Order, 5th class (MVO) ====
- John Francis Austin.
- Sergeant Major Albert Baker, MBE, Her Majesty's Bodyguard of the Yeomen of the Guard.
- Malcolm Blanch.
- James Daly.
- District Inspector John Alexander Henderson, Royal Ulster Constabulary.
- William Henry Hunt.
- Donald Wallis Lynam.
- Alfred Edward Myers.
- Percy Alphonse Neville.
- Flight Lieutenant Peter John Planterose, (4230313), Royal Air Force.
- Edith Rogers.

==== Medals of the Royal Victorian Order (RVM) ====
In Gold

- Ernest Reginald Tinson.

In Silver

- Ronald Henry Aubrey.
- Arthur Baker.
- M. 1925407 Chief Technician Frederick Bloor, Royal Air Force.
- Albert Edward Clouting.
- Walter Cooze.
- Albert Joseph Doel.
- X. 4176617 Sergeant Allan Ellis, Royal Air Force.
- Divisional Sergeant Major Charles Martin Estall, MC, Her Majesty's Bodyguard of the Yeomen of the Guard.
- Sergeant Henry Hall, Berkshire Constabulary.
- Ernest George Hatcher.
- Gethyn Jones.
- M. 4048185 Acting Corporal Christopher George McDonald, Royal Air Force.
- Frederick Cecil Ottaway.
- Henry Alfred Pyle.
- Ordnance Electrical Artificer First Class Frederick Charles Roads, P/MX 56155.
- Frederick Francis Whiting.

=== Order of the British Empire ===
==== Knight Grand Cross of the Order of the British Empire (GBE) ====
Civil Division

- Major The Most Noble Bernard Marmaduke, Duke of Norfolk, KG, GCVO, Chairman of the Council, Territorial and Auxiliary Forces Association.

==== Dames Commander of the Order of the British Empire (DBE) ====
Civil Division

- (Katharine) Annis Calder Gillie, OBE, MB, BS (Mrs. P. Smith), Immediate Past President, Royal College of General Practitioners.
- Mary Georgina Green, Headmistress, Kidbrooke School, Greenwich, London.
- Muriel Betty Powell, CBE, Matron, St. George's Hospital, London.

State of Victoria

- Hilda Mabel Stevenson, CBE. For outstanding services in many fields of social welfare.

==== Knights Commander of the Order of the British Empire (KBE) ====
Military Division

Royal Navy

- Vice-Admiral David Granville Clutterbuck, CB.

Royal Air Force

- Air Vice-Marshal Bernard Albert Chacksfield, CB, OBE.
- Air Vice-Marshal Cyril John Roderic Salmon, CB, OBE.

Civil Division

- Anthony Reay Mackay Geddes, OBE, Chairman, Dunlop Rubber Company Ltd. For services to Export.

==== Commanders of the Order of the British Empire (CBE) ====
Military Division

Royal Navy

- Instructor Captain Graham Powell Britton.
- Captain Hugh Askew Corbett, DSO, DSC.
- Surgeon Commodore Nicol Sinclair Hepburn, QHP, MB, ChB.
- Captain George Andrews Hewett, DSC.
- Captain Geoffrey John Kirkby, DSC (now retired).
- Captain Charles William Haimes Shepherd, OBE.

Army

- Brigadier Geoffrey Thomas Alexander Armitage, MBE (73005), late Royal Armoured Corps.
- Brigadier Ronald Douglas Austin (148882), Royal Pioneer Corps.
- Brigadier Charles Whish Dunbar, MBE (121519), Late Infantry.
- Brigadier Jack Bertie Dye, OBE, MC (148868), late Infantry, formerly Commander of the South Arabian Army.
- Major-General (acting) Ronald Whalley Eccles (101147), late Corps of Royal Electrical and Mechanical Engineers.
- Brigadier Roland Christopher Gibbs, DSO, MC (114083), late Infantry.
- Colonel Michael Tuberville Nevill Jennings (71875), late Infantry.
- Colonel John Kelsey (155911), late Corps of Royal Engineers.
- Colonel Ronald Thomas Stewart Macpherson, MC, TD (90855), late Royal Armoured Corps, Territorial and Army Volunteer Reserve.
- Brigadier David McQueen, DSO, OBE (62707), late Infantry.
- Brigadier Alan Albert Martin-Jenkins, OBE (134026), late Royal Army Ordnance Corps.
- Brigadier (Local) Grame Matthew Warrack, DSO, OBE, TD, LRCS, LRCP (57723), late Royal Army Medical Corps, Territorial and Army Volunteer Reserve.
- Brigadier Ronald Dare Wilson, MBE, MC (96170), late Infantry.

Royal Air Force

- Air Commodore Benjamin Harry Boon, OBE.
- Air Commodore Cresswell Montagu Clementi, OBE.
- Air Commodore Wilfred Owen Davies, MRCS, LRCP.
- Air Commodore James Roger Whelan, DSO, DFC.
- Group Captain John MacDonald Ayre.
- Group Captain Desmond Fitzalan Monteagle Browne, AFC.
- Group Captain William George Carr, MBE.
- Group Captain Alan David Dick, AFC.
- Group Captain Gordon Hugh Everitt, DSO, OBE, DFC (Retired). For services with the British Joint Services Training Team, Ghana.
- Group Captain Colin Marshall Fell, AFC.
- Group Captain William Allcock Griffiths, DFC. Formerly on loan to the Zambia Air Force.
- Group Captain Ross Philip Harding.
- Group Captain William Duncan Robertson.
- Wing Commander George Frain, OBE (90473) (Retired). For services while on loan to the Royal Malaysian Air Force.

Civil Division

- Colonel Frank Elliott Allday, OBE, TD, Chairman, Territorial and Auxiliary Forces Association for the County of Warwick.
- James Anderson, Alderman, Derbyshire County Council.
- Walter Charles Anderson, General Secretary, National and Local Government Officers' Association.
- David Andrews, OBE, JP. For services to Commerce in Northern Ireland.
- Wilfrid Andrews, Chairman, Royal Automobile Club.
- The Right Honourable George, Baron Archibald. For services to Parliament.
- Norman Frederick Astbury, Director, The British Ceramic Research Association.
- Henry Ballantyne, DL, Chairman, Henry Ballantyne and Sons, Ltd. For services to Export.
- Harold Rolf Bamberg, Chairman, British Eagle International Airlines Ltd.
- Basil Joseph Asher Bard, Board Member, and Chief Executive, Department of Applied Science, National Research Development Corporation.
- Ernest Anthony Barker, Chairman, Board of Governors of the United Sheffield Hospitals.
- Stanley George Barrett, Managing Director, Newcastle and Gateshead Water Company.
- Edward Leslie Thomas Barton, OBE, ERD, Chief of Telecommunications (Civil Aviation), Board of Trade.
- Charles William Bell, Chairman, Coats Patons Ltd. For services to Export.
- John Berry, lately Director, Scottish Headquarters, Nature Conservancy.
- Gordon Scott Bessey, Director of Education, Cumberland County Council. For services to youth.
- John Trevor Boon, Managing Director, Mills & Boon Ltd. For services to Export.
- Eric Bramley, Deputy Chief Inspector of Taxes, Board of Inland Revenue.
- Robert Ross Buchanan Brown, Chairman, Southern Electricity Board.
- The Honourable Alastair Francis Buchan, MBE, Director, Institute for Strategic Studies.
- Anthony Bull, OBE, Vice-Chairman, London Transport Board.
- Moran Victor Kingston Caplat, General Administrator, Glyndebourne.
- Wallace John Challens, OBE, Assistant Director, Weapons Group, Aldermaston, United Kingdom Atomic Energy Authority.
- George Roland Chetwynd, lately Director, North East Development Council.
- OFrank Sebastian Cooksey, OBE, MD, FRCP, Consultant in Physical Medicine, King's College Hospital; Consultant Adviser in Physical Medicine, Ministry of Health.
- Stanley Davies, JP, lately Mayor of Merthyr Tydfil.
- Colonel Samuel Percy Dawson, OBE, MM, TD, JP, DL. For services in the field of Local Authority Staff negotiations.
- Alan Graham Dawtry, MBE, TD, Town Clerk, City of Westminster.
- Duncan Alexander Cox Dewdney, Chairman, Economic Development Committee for the Mechanical Engineering Industry.
- Iorwerth Eiddon Stephen Edwards, Keeper of Egyptian Antiquities, British Museum.
- Roland Walter Foad, Lately Executive Member, Iron and Steel Board.
- Norman James Freeman, JP, Chairman, British Shippers Council.
- John Stuart Hinton Gaskain, MBE, HM Inspector of Constabulary. Commandant, The Police College.
- Charles Edward Gittins, Professor of Education, University College, Swansea.
- George Newman Gould, FRCVS, JP, Veterinary Surgeon, Southampton.
- Miss Grant (Sister Peter-Dolores), Headmistress, All Hallows Secondary Modern High School for Girls, Speke, Liverpool.
- James Shaw Grant, OBE, Chairman, Crofters Commission.
- Charles Barnard Groves, OBE, Musical Director and Principal Conductor, Royal Liverpool Philharmonic Orchestra.
- Archibald Richard Burdon Haldane, Lately Chairman, Trustee Savings Banks Inspection Committee.
- Benjamin Clifford Harrison, Managing Director, Alfred Herbert Ltd.
- Frank Ivor Hauser, Director of Productions, Oxford Playhouse (Meadow Players).
- James Stuart Hawnt, OBE. For services to Education in Northern Ireland.
- Samuel Howard. Lately Chairman (Pharmaceuticals Division), Imperial Chemical Industries Ltd.
- Francis Inglis, Secretary and Treasurer, Association of County Councils in Scotland.
- Gordon Percival Septimus Jacob, Composer.
- Richard Stringer Johnson, MBE, TD, Chairman, North Thames Gas Board.
- Edward Hywel Jones, General Manager (Engineering Services), South of Scotland Electricity Board.
- Robert James Kellar, MBE, FRCS, FRCP, Professor of Obstetrics and Gynaecology, University of Edinburgh.
- Archibald Brown Kerr, OBE, TD, MB, FRCS.(Ed), Consultant Surgeon, Glasgow Western Infirmary; Lecturer in Clinical Surgery, University of Glasgow.
- George Wilson Knight. For services to English Literature.
- Geraldine Olive Lack, Headmistress, Rosebery County Grammar School for Girls, Epsom.
- Kenneth Murray Leach, President, British Mechanical Engineering Federation. For services to Engineering and Export.
- George Cecil Lightfoot. For services to the Probation Service.
- Colonel Philip Henry Lloyd, TD, DL, Chairman, Leicestershire County Council.
- John Alexander Maclean, Director of Education, Inverness County Council.
- Ernest George William Millen, Commander, C. Department, Metropolitan Police.
- Commander Henry Kelsall Beckford Mitchell, JP, Royal Navy (Retired), Alderman, Dorset County Council.
- John Morley, Vice-Chairman and Managing Director, Lucas Gas Turbine Equipment Ltd.
- Alec Andrew Muir, DL, Chief Constable, Durham Constabulary.
- Frank Stephen Mummery, Deputy Chief Officer, London Fire Brigade.
- Clifford Henry Offord, Director and General Factory Manager, Scottish Factories, Honeywell Controls Ltd. For services to Export.
- Eduardo Luigi Paolozzi, Sculptor.
- William Drummond Macdonald Paton, DM, Professor of Pharmacology, University of Oxford.
- Douglas Henry Peacock, OBE, Elected Member, National Savings Committee, representing City of Manchester.
- Norman Henry Pizer, Senior Adviser (Science), National Agricultural Advisory Service, Ministry of Agriculture, Fisheries and Food.
- William Charles Franklyn Plomer, Poet.
- Frederick Bernard Pooley, County Architect and Town Planner, Buckinghamshire County Council.
- Victor Sawdon Pritchett, Author and Literary Critic.
- Harold Kilner Robin, OBE, Chief Engineer, Diplomatic Wireless Service, Foreign Office.
- John Foster Robinson, TD, Chairman and Managing Director, E. S. and A. Robinson (Holdings) Ltd. For services to Export.
- John Hewitt Rowley, Controller, Wales, British Broadcasting Corporation.
- Alderman Sir John Molesworth-St. Aubyn, Bt. For services to public life in Cornwall.
- Christine Florence Temple Saville, MRCS, LRCP (Mrs. Fisher), Senior Medical Officer, HM Prison Wakefield.
- Henry Hanson Schubart, Director, City Art Gallery, Bristol.
- John Christopher Seddon, Secretary and Commissioner, Civil Service Commission.
- Frederick Sellers, Lately Forestry Commissioner.
- Robert Patrick Webb Shackleton, MRCS, LRCP, Consultant Anaesthetist and Director of Postgraduate Education, Wessex Regional Hospital Board.
- Brigadier James Joseph Sloan, OBE, MC, Director of Remploy Ltd.
- John Mitchell Aitken Smith, TD, Chairman, National Computing Centre.
- Joseph Eric Smith, Headmaster, Sheldon Heath Comprehensive School, Birmingham.
- Thomas Edward Smith, Leader of the Council, London Borough of Greenwich.
- Russell Johnson Storey, JP, Vice President, The Magistrates' Association.
- Cyril James Tafft, Director of Fighting Vehicles and Engineer Equipment Production, Ministry of Defence (Army).
- Charles Geoffrey Thirlwall, MBE, City Engineer and Planning Officer, Leeds City Council.
- Professor Percy Tudor Thomas, Director, Welsh Plant Breeding Station, Aberystwyth.
- William Griffiths Thorpe, MBE, Managing Director, William Thorpe and Son Ltd.
- Eric Turner, Chairman, Birmingham Small Arms Company Ltd. For services to Export.
- Kenneth Charles Turner. For services to Road Transport.
- Lewis McLeod Watson, Chief Quantity Surveyor, Ministry of Health.
- David Rowland Wallace Watts, Assistant Managing Director, George Wimpey and Company, Ltd.
- Angus Frank Johnstone Wilson, Author.
- William Arthur Wilson. For services to the International Grain Trade.
- Asher Winegarten, Chief Economist, National Farmers' Union of England and Wales.
- John Wilfred Withrington, HM Inspector of Schools, Department of Education and Science.

Diplomatic Service and Overseas List

- David Lindsay Bate, Judge of the High Court of Justice, Northern States, Nigeria.
- Alfred Evan Charlton, British Subject lately resident in India.
- Idris Talog Davies, OBE, Attorney-General, Brunei.
- Phillip Rainsford Evans, MD, FRCP, lately Head of British Paediatric Team in Saigon.
- Sidney Samuel Gordon, OBE, JP. For public services in Hong Kong.
- William David Gregg, Director of Education, Hong Kong.
- Richard Norton Hollyer, OBE, British Council Liaison Officer in New Zealand and Information Officer, British High Commission, Wellington.
- Neil Angus Roderick Mackay, OBE, British Council Representative, Argentina.
- John Pike, lately Financial Secretary, Government of Sarawak.
- Francis Greenwich Torriano Sharp. For social services and for the promotion of the citrus industry in British Honduras.
- Sydney Martin Stadler, OBE, Honorary Vice-Consul at Her Majesty's Embassy, San Salvador and Honorary Commercial Attaché.
- Bertie Francis Walter Tull, British Subject resident in Brazil.
- Claudius Roland Walker, MD. For public services in the Bahama Islands.
- Edward Whitfield, British Subject resident in Nigeria.
- Arthur Howell Williams, British Subject resident in Peru.
- Cummings Vail Zuill, JP. For public services in Bermuda.

State of New South Wales

- Edward Leslie Beers, Vice President, Metropolitan Water, Sewerage and Drainage Board.
- Harry Maynard Rennie, MB, BS. For services to medicine and to the community.

State of Victoria

- Rupert Henry Arnold, JP, Chief Commissioner of Police, State of Victoria.
- John Miller Rodd. For services to the legal profession.

State of Queensland

- James Thomas Finimore. Mayor of Ipswich.
- Byrne Hart, MC. For services to the industrial, commercial and community life of the State.

State of South Australia

- Robert Ralph Horton, MB, BS, Director, Ashford House School for Cerebral Palsied Children, and Ashford House Activity Centre.

State of Western Australia

- Stephen Fred Schnaars, Chief Industrial Commissioner.

==== Officers of the Order of the British Empire (OBE) ====
Military Division

Royal Navy

- Commander John Goodwin Wordsworth Bingham.
- Commander John Hateley Blacklock.
- Commander John Lenox Breaks.
- Lieutenant Colonel Francis Clifford Edward Bye, Royal Marines.
- Commander Peter Carmichael, DSC.
- Commander James Joseph Louis Henegan, DSC.
- Commander Peter Stewart Hicks-Beach.
- Commander Michael Hugh Hutton.
- Commander Michael Kane MccGwire.
- Instructor Commander Alan James Garrod Newbery.
- Commander Robin Alfred Charles Owen.
- Surgeon Commander Patterson David Gordon Pugh, MB, BCh.
- The Reverend John Gabriel Scott.
- Commander Peter Doveton Sturdee.
- Commander Edward Maxwell Cunningham Walker (formerly on loan to the Kenya Navy).

Army

- Lieutenant-Colonel James Mills Adam, MB (37J 393), Royal Army Medical Corps.
- Lieutenant-Colonel The Most Honourable Archibald David the Marquess of Ailsa (330932), The Royal Highland Fusiliers (Princess Margaret's Own Glasgow and Ayrshire Regiment), Territorial and Army Volunteer Reserve.
- Lieutenant-Colonel Trevor Geoffrey Alexander (262470), The Somerset and Cornwall Light Infantry, formerly seconded to The Muscat Regiment, Sultan's Armed Forces.
- Lieutenant-Colonel William Richard Burton Allen (277879), 3rd Carabiniers (Prince of Wales's Dragoon Guards).
- Lieutenant-Colonel Thomas William Armour (271037), Royal Corps of Signals.
- Lieutenant-Colonel Eric Henry Overton Bailey (258160), Corps of Royal Electrical and Mechanical Engineers.
- Lieutenant-Colonel Peter Branwell, (325985), The Royal Hampshire Regiment.
- Lieutenant-Colonel Hugh William Longbourne Browne, MBE (303370), Corps of Royal Engineers.
- Lieutenant-Colonel Kenneth Charles Came (375127), The Parachute Regiment.
- Lieutenant-Colonel Robin MacDonald Carnegie, MBE (364503), The Queen's Own Hussars.
- Lieutenant-Colonel (acting) Gordon Henderson Carruthers, TD (374306), Combined Cadet Force.
- Colonel Archibald Rae Cornock (124271), late Royal Army Ordnance Corps.
- Lieutenant-Colonel Geoffrey Basil Curtis, MC (237626), The Queen's Regiment.
- Lieutenant-Colonel Howard William Girvan-Brown, MC (170228), Royal Army Ordnance Corps.
- Lieutenant-Colonel Peter Joseph Hall, TD (368115), The Queen's Regiment (Middlesex), Territorial and Army Volunteer Reserve.
- Lieutenant-Colonel Frank Edward Kitson, MBE, MC (362061), The Royal Green Jackets.
- Lieutenant-Colonel James Martlew, MBE (145156), The Lancashire Fusiliers.
- Lieutenant-Colonel Donald Angus McEwan (331031), Royal Army Ordnance Corps.
- Lieutenant-Colonel Cyril Morgan, MBE (416305), The South Wales Borderers.
- Lieutenant-Colonel (Quartermaster) Andrew John Crawford Morrow (356055), The Royal Ulster Rifles, formerly serving with the South Arabian Army.
- Lieutenant-Colonel Samuel Mervyn Hilary Nash (74513), Royal Regiment of Artillery.
- Lieutenant-Colonel Stanley Saul Palmer (164648), The Lancashire Regiment (Prince of Wales's Volunteers).
- Lieutenant-Colonel Douglas John Pegg (235487), Royal Corps of Transport.
- Lieutenant-Colonel (District Officer) Thomas Edward Pennicott (421912), Royal Regiment of Artillery (now retired).
- Lieutenant-Colonel David Arthur Polley (249748), Royal Corps of Signals.
- Lieutenant-Colonel (Master at Arms) Leslie Bernard Rouse (451598), Army Physical Training Corps.
- Lieutenant-Colonel Geoffrey Thomas More Scrope (138270), The Green Howards (Alexandra, Princess of Wales's Own Yorkshire Regiment).
- Lieutenant-Colonel (Traffic Officer) Cecil Vincent Walsh (230179), Royal Corps of Signals.
- Lieutenant-Colonel Hugh William Hadley Webb-Bowen (125183), Corps of Royal Engineers.

Royal Air Force

- Wing Commander John William Abrey (167757).
- Wing Commander (now Group Captain) Maurice Adams, AFC (201980).
- Wing Commander Robert Noel Archer, MBE (184638).
- Wing Commander Graham Ian Chapman, AFC (174421).
- Wing Commander George Alfred Crabb (48406). For services while on loan to the Royal Malaysian Air Force.
- Wing Commander David Harris Downs (135520). For services with the British Joint Services Training Team, Ghana.
- Wing Commander John Carpenter Foulkes (179325).
- Wing Officer Margaret Ruth Green (5209), Women's Royal Air Force.
- Wing Commander Anthony William Griffiths (153980).
- Wing Commander Daniel Alexander Ronald Lean, LDS (502685).
- Wing Commander Frank Richard Lockyer (607090).
- Wing Commander Peter Bernard MacCorkindale (180592).
- Wing Commander Donald McKay McWilliam (622222).
- Wing Commander Douglas Monks (51468).
- Wing Commander Donald Newell (164022).
- Wing Commander Albert John William Oliver (198949).
- Wing Commander Sidney James Perkins, AFC (124817).
- Wing Commander John de Milt Severne, MVO, AFC (57556).
- Acting Wing Commander William Charles Thomas Worf (189421), Royal Air Force Volunteer Reserve (Training Branch).
- Squadron Leader Edward Stanley Williams (1673046).

Civil Division

- Edgar Robert Inglis Allan, Chief Information Officer B, Exhibitions Division, Central Office of Information.
- Winifred Mary Allebone, MBE, BEM, JP, Chairman, National Savings East Midland Regional Street and Village Groups Committee.
- Colonel Eric George Walter Allen, ERD, Director, Lancashire and Merseyside Industrial Development Association.
- The Reverend Harold Reeves Allen, MBE, Chairman, County Antrim Savings Committee.
- Andrew Anderson, Assistant Keeper I, Scottish Record Office.
- James Askew, Alderman, Workington Borough Council.
- George Herbert Ayton, DCM, Honorary National Secretary, Distinguished Conduct Medal League.
- Philip Franz Cyril Bailey. For services to Music on Merseyside.
- Jack Balder, Director of Planning and Production, B.S.A. Motor Cycles Ltd.
- Alderman Albert Edward Ball, JP, Deputy Mayor of the London Borough of Barking and Chairman of the Civil Defence Sub-Committee.
- Melville Nicolson Balsillie, County Commissioner for Hertfordshire, Scout Association.
- Mary Elizabeth Barber, General Secretary, Society of Authors.
- Ronald Ernest Barker, Secretary, Publishers' Association, and for services to Export.
- Douglas Bell, MD, Lately Senior Chest Physician, North Eastern Regional Hospital Board (Scotland).
- Otto Louis Boll. For services to the printing industry.
- John Henry Boreham, Senior Administrative Assistant, Royal Society.
- John Charles Bourgoin, Grade 5A Officer, News Department, Foreign Office.
- Alice Annie Braybrook, JP. For services to local government in Wolverhampton.
- Frank Bretton. For services to local government in Epping and Ongar.
- Reginald Burns, JP. For services to youth in Southampton.
- Patrick Francis Burridge, Architect, Southend-on-Sea County Borough.
- Kathleen Marjorie Cameron, BEM, Chairman, Nurses and Midwives Whitley Council.
- Cyril Thomas Gordon Carter, Chief Constable, York City Police.
- Gavin Anderson Catto, Provincial Director, County Advisory Service, Edinburgh and East of Scotland College of Agriculture.
- Elsie Margaret Clifford, Archaeologist.
- Colonel William Cyrus Clissitt, TD, Secretary, Press Council.
- Howard Anthony Close, Lately Legal Adviser, National Federation of Building Trades Employers.
- William Clowser, Chief Executive Officer, HM Treasury.
- Captain Charles Alexander Sydney Colburn, Commodore, British Petroleum Tanker Company Ltd.
- Maurice Bertram Copus, Head of Arts Department, Southfields Comprehensive School, London.
- Raymond Frederick Creasey, Director of Advanced Systems and Technology, British Aircraft Corporation (Operating) Ltd, Preston Division, Lancashire.
- Stanley Herbert Creber, Secretary, Royal Academy of Music.
- Donald Lascelles Crombie, MD, General Medical Practitioner, Birmingham.
- John Reginald Cross, Chairman, Bristol Advisory Committee, Supplementary Benefits Commission.
- John Briggs Dalby, Organiser of Music, Aberdeen City Education Authority.
- Derek Charles Dashfield, MVO, Senior Chief Executive Officer, HM Stationery Office.
- Aylwin Ronald Davies, Headmaster, Rhyl High School.
- George Sidney Davies, Deputy Principal Accountant, Ministry of Defence (Royal Navy).
- Stanley James Davies, Chairman, A. Gallenkamp and Company Ltd, until 1967. Now a Director.
- Arthur Frederick Davis, Higher Collector, London Airports, Board of Customs and Excise.
- James Patrick De Courcy Meade, Head of Industrial Training Service.
- John Joseph Devlin, LRCPI & LM, LRCSI & LM, General Medical Practitioner, Fleetwood.
- Kenneth Newling Dick, General Manager, Visnews Ltd.
- James Dunbar, Superintending Civil Engineer, Ministry of Public Building and Works.
- Margaret Monti Eden, Head Psychiatric Social Worker, The Bethlem Royal Hospital and The Maudsley Hospital, London.
- Thomas Iorwerth Ellis. For services to cultural life in Wales.
- John English, Director, Midlands Arts Centre for Young People, Birmingham.
- Joseph Gwyn Evans, JP, Chairman, Cardiganshire Agricultural Executive Committee.
- Henry Charles Honess Fairchild, Under-Treasurer of Lincoln's Inn.
- Frederick Solomon Fidlan, Principal Scientific Officer, Ministry of Defence.
- Robert Foulkes, JP, Alderman, Lancashire County Council.
- Alfred Foyston, Chairman, English Schools Athletic Association.
- Ronald Ewart Frampton. For services to horticulture.
- Sydney Ernest Franklin, JP. For services to the London Federation of Boys Clubs.
- Joseph William Freeman, Children's Officer, Sheffield County Borough.
- Gerald Robert Holme Geoghegan, Chief Technical Manager, Production Group, Capenhurst Works, United Kingdom Atomic Energy Authority.
- Thomas Walker Gibson, Chief Distribution Engineer, South Eastern Gas Board.
- Henry William Grainger, Chief Engineer, Ocean Fleets Ltd.
- Thomas William Graveney. For services to Cricket.
- James Henry Gray, Farmer, Warwickshire. For services to Agricultural Co-operation.
- Frederic George Gregory, Chairman Southampton National Insurance Local Tribunal.
- David Robertson Greig, Manager, Highways and Traffic Department, The Automobile Association.
- John Cameron McNeil Greig, MC, Secretary, Hire Purchase Trade Association.
- Sidney Grieve, Clerk to West Penwith Rural District Council.
- Arthur William Groocock, Director and Secretary, Rediffusion Television Ltd.
- Hugh Kenneth Mackay Haggart, Senior Mechanical and Electrical Engineer, Ministry of Public Building and Works, formerly in Aden.
- Jack Hubert Hamence, Senior Director, Dr. Bernard Dyer and Partners (1948) Ltd, Analytical and Consulting Chemists, London.
- Jack Hanson, Chief Welfare Officer, London Borough of Bromley.
- Lieutenant-Colonel Sir (George) Arthur Harford, Bt, Vice-Chairman, Victoria League for Commonwealth Friendship.
- William Victor Harris, Director, Termite Research Unit.
- Benjamin Hyde Harvey, General Manager, Harlow Development Corporation.
- Donald Hicks. Lately Director-General, British Coal Utilisation Research Association.
- Edward Leslie Hill, Senior Principal Scientific Officer. Director, Stores and Clothing Research and Development Establishment, Ministry of Defence (Army).
- Sydney Hill, General Secretary, National Union of Public Employees; Member, Whitley Councils for the Health Services.
- Walter Ian Scott-Hill, Regional Director (United Kingdom and Ireland), British European Airways.
- Major Horace Reginald Hockley, lately Vice-Chairman, Society of Technical Publications Contractors Ltd.
- Norman Henry Hole, MRCVS, lately Senior Research Officer Grade I, Ministry of Agriculture, Fisheries and Food.
- Cecil Henry Hollis, JP, Chairman, Rutland Agricultural Executive Committee.
- Winifred Alice Holmes, Chairman, The Women's Council.
- James Edward Holroyd, Principal Information Officer, Board of Trade.
- Alderman James Howard, JP, Mayor of Lisburn, County Antrim.
- Alfred Henry Howlett, HM Inspector of Schools, Department of Education and Science.
- Raymond Hull, Senior Principal Scientific Officer, Rothamsted Experimental Station.
- John Godfrey Inglis, General Manager, Scottish Milk Marketing Board.
- Samuel Thomas Ithell, JP, Chairman, Flintshire County Council.
- John Jackson, Firemaster, Angus Area Fire Brigade.
- John Cecil Wallace Jacob, Formerly General Manager, Cable & Wireless, Aden. Manager Designate, Malta.
- Reginald Lentell Jeffery, District Postmaster, Western District Office, London, General Post Office.
- Daniel Jenkyn Jones, Composer.
- James Wilfred Jones, Member, Montgomeryshire County Council.
- John Selvyyn Jones, JP, Alderman, Lancashire County Council.
- John William Jones. For services to freshwater biology.
- Alec Joseph Kean, Chief Welfare and Safety Officer, Associated Portland Cement Manufacturers Ltd.
- Alderman Mary Margaret Cecilia Kemball, JP, Chairman, Welfare Services Sub-Committee of Lancashire County Council.
- Charles Ralph King, Senior Partner, Henry Cooper and Sons, Reading.
- Robert Lacey, County Surveyor, Cambridgeshire and Isle of Ely County Council.
- Ronald Edward Latham, lately Principal Assistant Keeper, Public Record Office.
- Captain Frederick James Layers, lately Commodore Master, MV Port Nicholson, Port Line Ltd.
- Lesley Lewis. For services to local government in Ipswich.
- Lilian Beatrice Lewis, Director, Carmarthenshire Branch, British Red Cross Society.
- James Stevenson Logan, MB, ChB, lately Medical Officer of Health, Southend-on-Sea County Borough.
- Helen Longmuir, Honorary Secretary and Honorary Treasurer, Cork District, Soldiers', Sailors' and Airmen's Families Association.
- Matthew Lowe, Alderman, County Borough of Derby.
- Elizabeth Mabbott, Headmistress, Ty Isaf Infants School, Pontymister, Monmouthshire.
- Robert McCartney. Lately Chief Constable, Herefordshire Constabulary.
- John Alexander Harold McClelland, MB, BCh, Honorary Physician to the Household of the Governor of Northern Ireland.
- Edward McEnery, President, Working Men's Club and Institute Union, Ltd.
- Gwyneth Mary McKenzie, Principal Architect, Ministry of Housing and Local Government.
- Kenneth James McKillop, Director, The Water-Tube Boilermakers Association.
- Frederick Edward Bradshaw MacManus, Architect.
- Donald McNeil, Director of Research, The Coal Tar Research Association.
- James Downs Rumsby McVie, Headmaster, Upsbury Manor County Secondary School, Gillingham, Kent.
- Arthur McDougall Maiden, MB, ChB, General Medical Practitioner, Lincolnshire.
- William Marshall, MB, ChB, Chairman, Peterborough Disablement Advisory Committee.
- Percy John Martin, Senior Inspector of Taxes, Board of Inland Revenue.
- Muriel Phyllis Carroll-Marx, MBE, Head of Training Department, Women's Royal Voluntary Service.
- Thomas Snelgrove Miles, Electrical Consultant, W. H. Allen, Sons and Company Ltd.
- Michael John Moore, JP. Alderman, Lancashire County Council.
- Thomas Moore, MBE, Chief Constable, Nottingham City Police.
- Hugh Ceiriog Morris, Headmaster, Garth County Secondary School for Boys, Morden, Surrey.
- Frank Morton, Professor of Chemical Engineering, Institute of Science and Technology, University of Manchester.
- Charles Geoffrey Moss, Deputy Chairman, London Electricity Board.
- Norman Robert Norfolk, DFC, Chief Superintendent, London Air Traffic Control Centre, Board of Trade.
- Edna Mary Oakeshott, Senior Lecturer in Child Development, Institute of Education, University of London.
- Kenneth Turner O'Brien, MBE, Chairman, National Savings Yorkshire Regional Educational Committee.
- Alderman Oscar Lionel Oxley, Chairman, Tilbury and South East Essex Hospital Management Committee.
- Geoffrey Watts Padwick, Overseas Director, Plant Protection Ltd, Fernhurst, Surrey. For services to Export.
- Arthur Page, Vice-Principal and Head of Mathematics Department, Borough Road College of Education, Isleworth.
- The Right Honourable Raymond Cecil, Baron, Palmer, Chairman, Southern Regional National Savings Industrial Council.
- Morley Thomas Parry, Food Hygiene Advisory Officer, Ministry of Health.
- Terence Parry, General Secretary, Fire Brigades Union.
- Robert Samuel Perkins, JP, Chairman, Wigan Trustee Savings Bank.
- Beverley Paul Pick, Principal, Beverley Pick Associates Ltd. For services in connection with Expo '67.
- Frank Reginald Pollard, MBE, lately Deputy Commander, C Department, Metropolitan Police.
- Alderman Winifred Pomeroy. For social services in Uxbridge.
- Edwin Reginald Thomas Ponsford, Chairman and Managing Director, Solartron Electronic Group Ltd. For services to Export.
- Evelyn Mary Pope, President, National Association of Flower Arrangement Societies of Great Britain.
- Marie Frances Popper, JP. For services to children in Belfast.
- Jerzy Antoni Preiss, Senior Principal Scientific Officer, Ministry of Technology.
- Frank Procter, lately Manager, Dairy Department, Birmingham Co-operative Wholesale Society Ltd.
- Charles Alfred Ramsden, Chairman and Managing Director, Halifax Evening Courier and Guardian.
- Lieutenant-Colonel Harold Riggall, JP, DL, lately Chairman, Lincoln City Advisory Committee on Justices of the Peace.
- Brigadier James Norman Ritchie, MC, TD, DL, Honorary Director, Shropshire and West Midland Agricultural Society.
- John Alan Rixon, General Manager, Markets Department, City of Manchester.
- Tom Sanderson, JP, Chairman of Workington Youth Employment Committee and Chairman of Local Employment Committee.
- Desmond James Scannell, Executive Sales Director, Borg-Warner Ltd. For services to Export.
- Sheila Christine Scott. Solo Flyer.
- Clifford Sellick, MBE, Vice-Chairman, Rural District Councils Association of England and Wales.
- Richard George Shave, Chairman and Managing Director, Bradbury Wilkinson and Company Ltd. For services to Export.
- Fanny Eliza Shaw, Matron, Newcastle upon Tyne General Hospital.
- Samuel Sheppard, Fish Merchant, Billingsgate.
- Joseph Shlosberg, MB, ChB, JP. For services to local government in Salford.
- Clifford Henry Shoemake, Lately Governor Class I, HM Prison Brixton.
- Laurence James Sillito, Secretary and Treasurer, Church of England Pensions Board.
- Gerald Ramsay Simmons, Chairman, Birmingham and Sutton Coldfield War Pensions Committee.
- Henry George Simpson, Housing Manager, London Borough of Lambeth.
- Robert Frederick Smart, Administrative Officer (Principal), Medical Research Council.
- Beryl Violet Ethel Smith, Buyer and Equipment Officer and Member of the Council of Management of Malcolm Clubs.
- Stephen Walter Smithers, British Broadcasting Corporation Representative in Canada.
- Hutchison Burt Sneddon, Chairman, Housing Committee, Motherwell and Wishaw Town Council.
- Kenneth Arthur Sprayson, Headmaster, Sir James Smith's School, Camelford, Cornwall.
- William Henry Storey, Managing Director, Unicam Instruments Ltd. For services to Export.
- Francis Fenton Swalwell, TD, Assistant Accountant and Comptroller General, Board of Inland Revenue.
- William Joseph Arnold Sykes, Chief Mechanical and Electrical Engineer, Southern Region, British Railways Board.
- Harry Symons. Secretary, Corporation of Church House.
- Ernest William Tandy, Alderman, Leicestershire County Council.
- Maurice Ewan Taylor, County Planning Officer, Fife.
- Mary Elizabeth Teed, Grade 5 Officer, HM Diplomatic Service.
- Rachel Thomas, Actress.
- William Thornley, Chairman and Managing Director, Dobson & Barlow Ltd. For services to Export.
- Thomas Buchanan Tod, MC, Member, Board of Governors, United Liverpool Hospitals.
- Jack Towey, AFC, Headmaster, Park Secondary Modern School, Dudley, Staffordshire.
- Rees Griffiths Trent, Deputy Controller, West Midlands Region, Ministry of Social Security.
- George Fred Parkhurst Trubridge, Joint Deputy Manager, Summerfield Research Station, Imperial Metal Industries (Kynoch) Ltd., Kidderminster.
- Observer Captain Ernest Charles Douglas Tyrrell, Area Commandant, Midland Area, Royal Observer Corps.
- Andre Varga, Chairman and Managing Director, Carding Specialists Company Ltd.
- Sidney Eustace Virgo, Senior Principal Scientific Officer, Headquarters, Bomber Command, Ministry of Defence (Royal Air Force).
- David Arnold Walker, Director, Scottish Council for Research in Education.
- Franklin Walley Ward, Chairman, Shropshire Agricultural Executive Committee.
- Hugh Alan Warren, Principal, South East London Technical College.
- Barbara Smith Watson, Superintendent of Schools for Handicapped Children, Glasgow Education Authority.
- John Weightman, Grade 2 Officer, Ministry of Labour.
- Albeit Charles Whiffin, Senior Principal Scientific Officer, Road Research Laboratory, Ministry of Transport.
- Harold Walter White, Secretary, South Western Regional Hospital Board.
- William Wilkinson. Lately President, Fleetwood Fishing Vessel Owners' Association.
- Eric Edward Williams, Senior Principal Scientific Officer, Senior Regional Officer, Wales, Ministry of Technology.
- George Williams, Director and General Manager, Shell United Kingdom Exploration and Production, Ltd.
- Walter Frederick Stanley Woodford, Secretary, The Institution of Production Engineers.
- Thomas Henry Charles Worthington, Managing Director, Heal Fabrics, Ltd.
- Raymond Foyle York, Director, Harrison and Sons Ltd.

Diplomatic Service and Overseas List

- David Norman Andrews, Senior Agricultural Officer in charge of Tea Division, Mauritius.
- Henry St. John Basil Armitage, lately First Secretary (Commercial), Her Majesty's Embassy, Baghdad.
- Brian Harborough Ashford-Russell, MBE, First Secretary (local Counsellor) (Information), Her Majesty's Embassy, Rome.
- Leo Irving Sylvanus Austin, Attorney-General, Dominica.
- Marie Gwendolen Barnes, lately Chief Matron, Botswana.
- Julian Sanders Bates, British Subject resident in the United States.
- Thomas Brunton Beattie, First Secretary, Her Majesty's Embassy, Athens.
- Anthony Owen Blishen, First Secretary and Vice-Consul, Office of the British Chargé d'Affaires, Peking.
- Edward Bolton-King, British Council Science Officer, Chile.
- Patrick Kilgour Booker, lately Permanent Secretary, Ministry of Finance, Federation of South Arabia.
- John Eric Brady, lately Permanent Secretary, Federal Ministry of Education, Aden.
- Lieutenant-Colonel William Maurice Brown, New Zealand Citizen lately resident in Pakistan.
- Mary Bryson Bruce, Headmistress, Alliance Girls' High School, Nairobi.
- The Reverend George Buchanan, Rector of Christ Church, Warwick Parish, Bermuda. For public and social welfare services.
- Michael Anthony Choyce, Chief Research Officer, Cotton Research Corporation, Institute for Agricultural Research, Samaru, Nigeria.
- Chung Sze-yuen. For public services and services to industry in Hong Kong.
- Robert Arthur Clarke, MBE, lately Assistant Adviser, East Aden Protectorate.
- Eric Cox, British Subject resident in Iran.
- William McKerrow Crichton, Headmaster, Ntare Secondary School, Uganda.
- Norman Alexander Daniel, British Council Representative, Sudan.
- Charles Henry Teleman Hubert Dinzey, For public and voluntary services in Saint Christopher-Nevis-Anguilla.
- James McCulloch Dougary, lately British Subject resident in Kuwait.
- Mildred Blackwell Forrester, MBE, Her Majesty's Consul, Madrid.
- John Mather Gibb, lately First Secretary, British High Commission, Jamaica.
- Kenneth James Gilchrist, MB, FRCS, Principal, Fiji School of Medicine.
- David George Godfrey, lately Senior Principal Research Officer, Nigeria.
- Joseph Francis Long Grocott, British Subject lately resident in Sweden.
- Leonard Ernest Hands, British Subject resident in France.
- Douglas Harper, British Subject resident in Nigeria.
- John Kingsley Havers, QC, Attorney-General, British Honduras.
- Kenneth Joseph Hawkins, lately British European Airways Representative in Moscow.
- James Patrick Ivan Hennessy, MBE, Permanent Secretary, Ministry of Local Government, Lesotho.
- Michael Alexander Robert Young-Herries, MC, JP. For public services in Hong Kong.
- Peter McGregor Hewitt, lately British Diplomatic Representative in Shanghai.
- Lieutenant-Colonel Evelyn Arthur Charles Hunt. For services to the community in Gibraltar.
- Raymond Henry Kenten, British Subject resident in Ghana.
- Roy Herbert Link, lately British Consul (Commercial), Düsseldorf.
- Edward Aspinall Lister, Senior Investigation Officer, Department of Inland Revenue, Malaysia.
- Henry Frank Lloyd, British Subject resident in Germany.
- Roderick Maclean, Acting Under Secretary (Finance), Ministry of Finance, Sabah.
- Allan Lawrie Mapham, Senior Agricultural Officer, Swaziland.
- Peter Lewis Miles, Chief Architect, Federal Ministry of Works and Housing, Nigeria.
- Henry Mowschenson, Acting Superintendent, Blantyre General Hospital, Malawi.
- Anthony Richard Newman, lately First Secretary, Political Affairs Staff, Aden.
- Pang Teng-cheung, MD, MC. Path., Specialist, Forensic Pathology Unit, Hong Kong.
- James Roland Walter Parker, lately Deputy British High Commissioner, Enugu.
- Dennis Wilfred Maximilian Pierotti, In charge of British Interests in Iraq Section in Her Majesty's Embassy at Stockholm.
- Henryk Podlewski, MB, Ch.B, Psychiatrist, Ministry of Health, Bahama Islands.
- William Douglas Procter, lately Acting Director, Geological Survey, West Malaysia.
- John Arthur Pugh, First Secretary (Economic), Her Majesty's Embassy, Bangkok.
- The Reverend Douglas Royston Rawlins, Deputy Director of Education, Sarawak.
- Horace Vincent Richardson, Her Majesty's Consul, Cairo.
- Harold Roy Roberts, British Subject resident in Italy.
- Brian Anthony Rogers, lately Chief Water Engineer, Northern States, Nigeria.
- William Herbert Sanders, Australian Citizen resident in the Persian Gulf.
- Eva Sansome, lately Reader in Department of Botany, Ahmadu Bello University, Zaria, Nigeria.
- Captain Joseph Armand Sauvage, Port Officer, Seychelles.
- Charles Payne Sutcliffe, MBE, Senior Assistant Commissioner of Police, Hong Kong.
- Paul Tsui Ka-cheung, MBE, Senior Administrative Officer, Class B II; Acting Secretary for Chinese Affairs, Hong Kong.
- Dacre Watson, British Subject resident in Chile.
- Nigel John Vale Watt, Director of Information Services, Hong Kong.
- Francis Henry Ray White, lately British Subject resident in Iran.
- Raymond William Whitney, First Secretary, Office of the British Chargé d'Affaires, Peking.
- Michael Robert Butler Williams, lately Permanent Secretary, Ministry of Local Government and Lands, Botswana.
- Ashley William Edgell Winlaw, formerly Headmaster, Cadet College Hasan Abdal, West Pakistan.

State of New South Wales

- William George Buckley. For services to sport, especially Rugby Football, and to the community.
- Israel Green. For services to the community, particularly to hospitals.
- Ion Llewellyn Idriess. For services to literature.
- Dorothy Gordon Jenner. For services to broadcasting.
- Alderman Cecil Leatham Kyle. For services to local government.
- Isobel Marion Dorothea Mackellar. For services to literature.

State of Victoria

- Hector William Crawford. Director of Music for the People.
- William Lawrence Kraft. For outstanding services to the community and to the dairy industry.
- Lorna Lloyd-Green, MB, BS. For services to the community as a medical practitioner over many years.
- Helena Catherine Marfell, JP. For social welfare services to the community.
- Leslie Fielding Payne, JP. For services to the community, particularly local government.
- George Roy Schintler. For services to the community, particularly to hospitals and local government.
- Mary Torney. For services to the community.

State of Queensland

- Beryl Emma Burbidge, General Matron, Royal Brisbane Hospital.
- Bert Martin. For charitable services to the community.
- George Ferguson Scott. For services to the community.
- Ronald Upcott Sloman. For services to Horse Racing.

State of South Australia

- Kenneth James Tomkinson, JP, Mayor of the Town of St Peters.
- Albert Harris Turnbull. For local government and community services.
- Constance Lockyer Watt, Matron, Home for Incurables, Incorporated, Fullarton.

State of Western Australia

- Robert Mitford Rowell, JP. For services to the community, particularly local government.
- Gerardus Hubertus Vos. For outstanding services to medical research.

State of Tasmania

- William Edward Copley. For social welfare services particularly as Director of the Old People's Welfare Council.
- Reginald George Blundstone. For services to the community.

==== Members of the Order of the British Empire (MBE) ====
Military Division

Royal Navy

- Lieutenant Commander Alastair Sim Anderson.
- Lieutenant (CS) Walter Atkinson.
- Lieutenant Commander (SD) (TAS) George James Bartholomew. Formerly on loan to the Royal Malaysian Navy.
- Captain (SD) George Leonard Bream, BEM, Royal Marines.
- Lieutenant Commander Bryan Joseph Reeve Bulpitt, VRD, Royal Naval Reserve.
- Lieutenant Commander John William Daubney.
- Lieutenant Commander John Patrick Donovan.
- Engineer Lieutenant Commander Victor Gunson.
- Engineer Lieutenant (L) Derek Roy Horn. Formerly serving with the British Joint Services Training Team, Ghana.
- Instructor Lieutenant Commander Albert Edward Kinsey. Formerly serving with the Royal Navy Training Team, Kenya.
- Lieutenant Commander James Alner Long (now Retired).
- Lieutenant Commander (SCC) Allan Gibbon Mitchell, Royal Naval Reserve.
- Lieutenant David John Newsom. Formerly serving with the Royal Navy Training Team, Kenya.
- Lieutenant Commander Soren Bendix Olsen.
- Lieutenant Commander John Littleton Parford.
- Major Hugh Spencer Stephen Poyntz, Royal Marines.
- Engineer Lieutenant (M/E) William David George Ryder.
- Instructor Lieutenant Commander Geoffrey Scott Stavert.

Army

- Major (Quartermaster) John George Basey (451077), Royal Tank Regiment.
- Major Thomas Fredrick Basson (253968), Royal Army Ordnance Corps.
- Captain (Master at Arms) Stanley Blacknell (467931), Army Physical Training Corps.
- Major Colin John Bowden (437016), The Loyal Regiment (North Lancashire).
- Major William Gwynne Bowen (270600), Royal Army Pay Corps.
- Major (acting) George Bryan Campbell (443412), The Royal Highland Fusiliers (Princess Margaret's Own Glasgow and Ayrshire Regiment).
- Major David Bryan Hall Colley (433082), Royal Corps of Transport.
- 22030459 Warrant Officer Class I Robert Victor Cook, Royal Army Ordnance Corps.
- Major Alexander Campbell Dewar (315644), Royal Army Pay Corps.
- Major (Quartermaster) Jack Alexander Dickson (455861), The Black Watch (Royal Highland Regiment).
- Major William Leonard John Duncan (170449), Royal Army Pay Corps.
- 22538949 Warrant Officer Class II Arthur Thomas Foster, The Parachute Regiment.
- Major (Staff Quartermaster) David William Arthur Gardiner (363581), Royal Corps of Transport.
- Captain (Quartermaster) Roy George William Gillard (477204), The Somerset and Cornwall Light Infantry, formerly serving with the Singapore Infantry Regiment.
- 14465126 Warrant Officer Class I John Gray, Royal Ulster Rifles.
- Major Robert Stanley Anthony Grey (187392), Royal Regiment of Artillery.
- Captain (Quartermaster) Neville George Griffin (472911), Royal Army Ordnance Corps.
- Major (acting) Albert James Haddrell (371878), Royal Corps of Transport.
- Major John Halmshaw (411962), The Prince of Wales's Own Regiment of Yorkshire.
- Lieutenant-Colonel Eric Jim Hellier (391565), Royal Corps of Signals.
- 5773560 Warrant Officer Class I, Victor Herd, The Royal Anglian Regiment.
- 22309159 Warrant Officer Class II, Peter Richard George Herrett, Corps of Royal Electrical and Mechanical Engineers, formerly serving with the South Arabian Army.
- Major Charles Thomas Purvis Holland (337883), Corps of Royal Engineers.
- Captain (acting) James McKeown Howcroft (481603), The Royal Inniskilling Fusiliers.
- 22212772 Warrant Officer Class II, Donald Hughes, Army Physical Training Corps.
- Major John Ernest Michael Hughes (437092), Royal Regiment of Artillery.
- Captain (Quartermaster) Walter James Hunter (461097), The Queen's Own Lowland Yeomanry (T), Territorial and Army Volunteer Reserve (now R.A.R.O.).
- Major (Quartermaster) Trevor Harry Frederick Jones (461018), Royal Regiment of Artillery.
- Major John Kemp (441639), Royal Army Educational Corps.
- Captain (Quartermaster) James Kenny (454746), The Lancashire Regiment, (Prince of Wales's Volunteers).
- 3192732 Warrant Officer Class I, Thomas Blackie Kirkhope, MM, The King's Own Scottish Borderers, on loan to Royal Brunei Malay Regiment.
- 22196498 Warrant Officer Class I, (acting) John Lovatt, Intelligence Corps.
- 22515011 Warrant Officer Class I (acting), Alan George Maxwell, Royal Corps of Signals.
- Major Graham Frederick Miller, MC (312145), General List. Serving with the Malawi Rifles.
- Captain (Quartermaster) Peter William Edward Parry (473194), Grenadier Guards.
- Major (Quartermaster) George Edward Henry Perry (436431), Corps of Royal Electrical and Mechanical Engineers.
- Major (acting) Ronald Ernest Pounds (280238), Army Cadet Force.
- Major Ian Douglas Pybus (430423), The Queen's Regiment.
- Major Donald James Reid, TD (292120), Royal Corps of Signals, Territorial and Army Volunteer Reserve.
- Major Geoffrey Walter Roberts (403666), Corps of Royal Engineers, on loan to the Malaysian Armed Forces.
- Major Charles Frederick Rose (376998), Corps of Royal Engineers.
- Major (acting) John Sinton (455579), Army Cadet Force.
- Major Arthur Alexander Sisson (352717), Royal Regiment of Artillery.
- Major Angus Howard Southwood (408046), Intelligence Corps.
- Major Walter Sydney Stean (400073), Royal Army Ordnance Corps, formerly serving with the British Joint Services Training Team, Jamaica.
- Lieutenant-Colonel (acting) Geoffrey Middleton Stewart (226594), Royal Army Pay Corps, formerly serving with the British Joint Services Training Team, Jamaica.
- Major (Queen's Gurkha Officer) Tambasing Gurung, MVO (417189) 6th Queen Elizabeth's Own Gurkha Rifles.
- Major Peter Thain (380879), Royal Anglian Regiment, formerly serving with the Singapore Infantry Regiment.
- Major Ralph Roche Thompson (397064), Royal Corps of Transport.
- 22213068 Warrant Officer Class I, William Roland Tingey, Grenadier Guards.
- Major Thomas Charles Victor Todd, TD, (95024), The King's Own Royal Border Regiment, formerly serving with the South Arabian Army.
- 22550556 Warrant Officer Class II, Patrick William Turner, Corps of Royal Engineers.
- Captain Richard Vyvyan-Robinson (448496), The Somerset and Cornwall Light Infantry.
- Major (Quartermaster) Francis William Wall (457839), Royal Regiment of Artillery.
- Captain (P.S.O.) Charles Howard Walsh (167305), Royal Regiment of Artillery, Territorial and Army Volunteer Reserve.
- Major Richard Norman Walton (379301), The Cameronians (Scottish Rifles).
- 19037549 Warrant Officer Class II, Sidney John Warrilow, Royal Corps of Engineers (now retired).
- Major Barry Alexander Webster (408074), Royal Pioneer Corps.
- Major Robert Wheatley (403972), Corps of Royal Engineers.
- Brevet Major William Carpenter Wilkins, TD (303960), Corps of Royal Electrical and Mechanical Engineers, Terntorial and Army Volunteer Reserve (now retired).
- Captain (Quartermaster) Richard Clarence Williams (468171), Welsh Guards.
- Major (acting) Hugh Williamson (395187), Army Cadet Force.
- Major (Quartermaster) Robert Wilson (435494), The Royal Scots Greys (2nd Dragoons).

Overseas Awards

- Major Solomon Matthew Bard, ED, Royal Hong Kong Volunteer Defence Force.
- Major John Irving Howell, ED, lately Commander of Saint Christopher-Nevis-Anguilla Defence Force.

Royal Air Force

- Squadron Leader Eric Bean (53982).
- Squadron Leader Christopher Joseph Bleakley (162834). For services with the British Joint Services Training Team, Ghana.
- Squadron Leader Charles Vernon Cadogan (562023) (Retired).
- Squadron Leader John Granville Dean (572869).
- Squadron Leader Arthur George Ellis (58769).
- Squadron Leader Brian Clifford Farrer (3514617).
- Squadron Leader Gerald Gray (178969).
- Squadron Leader Joseph Hard Staff (4119212).
- Squadron Leader Harry Hicks (191885).
- Squadron Leader Alfred George Isham (563659).
- Squadron Leader (Acting Wing Commander) Cyril Reginald Scott-Jackson (59164).
- Squadron Leader John Keith Jackson (2322154).
- Squadron Leader (Acting Wing Commander) Ian Lindsay Macaulay Johnston (168361).
- Squadron Leader Chesney William Noel Kennedy (4034675).
- Squadron Leader Gilbert Marshall Morrison (586035).
- Squadron Leader Kenneth Jack Newman, DFC (172303).
- Squadron Leader Eric Edward Reeves (3110035).
- Squadron Leader Boleslaw Marian Regeli (500226) (Retired).
- Squadron Leader Peter Aubrey John Shelley (147452).
- Squadron Leader Thomas Ross Smith (532050). For services while on loan to the Royal Malaysian Air Force.
- Squadron Leader Edward Andrew Thow Sullivan (591089).
- Squadron Leader Ronald Thomas Furnie Waterfall (500174), Royal Air Force Regiment.
- Squadron Officer Margaret Wood (406969), Princess Mary's Royal Air Force Nursing Service (Retired).
- Acting Squadron Leader Clement Roy Walmsley (572418).
- Flight Lieutenant Richard Stephen Allgood (3516189). For services with the British Joint Services Training Team, Zambia.
- Flight Lieutenant Derek Noel Brown (3500675).
- Flight Lieutenant Derek Cavanah (3508414).
- Flight Lieutenant David John Curtis (195612).
- Flight Lieutenant Hugh John Feeley (583946).
- Flight Lieutenant John McGarvey (2620960).
- Flight Lieutenant Edmund Mosey (564913).
- Acting Flight Lieutenant Denis Alec Morley Jackson (3091359), Royal Air Force Volunteer Reserve (Training Branch).
- Master Navigator Kenneth Albert Frederick Woods (V1862665).
- Warrant Officer Louisa Miriam Bartlett (X0896175), Women's Royal Air Force.
- Warrant Officer John Joseph Deary (G4020340).
- Warrant Officer Alfred George Frederick Glover (D0537663).
- Warrant Officer Leonard Arthur Green (W0533574).
- Warrant Officer William Henry Griffiths (V0639261).
- Warrant Officer James Alfred Jones (E0628955).
- Warrant Officer Stanley Albert Lurcock (A0575308).
- Warrant Officer Ronald Cuthbert Shearn (C1406440), Royal Air Force Regiment.
- Warrant Officer Robert Lindsay Treasure (E0547599).

Civil Division

- Robert Adam, JP, Director and Secretary, James Robertson & Sons (Preserve Manufacturers) Ltd. For services to Export.
- Agnes Crosbie Aiken, Principal Tutor, Stracathro Hospital, Brechin.
- Eric Edward Aldridge, Land Service Assistant I, Ministry of Agriculture, Fisheries and Food.
- Alice Elizabeth Alford, Area Staff Officer (Nursing Cadets) Central Area, Hampshire, St. John Ambulance Brigade.
- Catherine Murray Allan, Assistant for Special Duties, British Rail Catering.
- John Allen, Chief Superintendent, Lancashire Constabulary.
- Eric Anderson, lately Acting Commandant, Fire Service Training Centre, Moreton-in-Marsh.
- George Boyd Anderson, MC. For services to Ski-ing in Scotland.
- John Anderson, Clerk to the Sunderland Bridge Parish Council.
- Wilfred Ardron, Executive Officer, Ministry of Social Security.
- Clifford Atwell, Vice-Chairman, Reading and District Hospital Management Committee.
- William Baglin, Television News Cameraman, British Broadcasting Corporation.
- Ernest Baker, Director, Premises Department, British Council.
- Albert Edward Baller, Principal Process Supervisor, Production Group, Springfields Works, United Kingdom Atomic Energy Authority.
- Walter Barnes. For services to the community in Audenshaw, Lancashire.
- Kathleen Joan Bartlett, Founder and Honorary Secretary, Servite Homes for the elderly or disabled.
- Margaret Hilda Bateman, Assistant in the Prime Minister's Office.
- Laurence Aubrey Baxter, Senior Experimental Officer, National Institute of Oceanography.
- Edward Arthur Beaumont, Superintendent Engineer, External Broadcasting, British Broadcasting Corporation.
- Christopher Charles Macintosh Bell, Engineer II, Ministry of Defence.
- Gwendolin Doris Bell, County Borough Organiser, Birkenhead, Women's Royal Voluntary Service.
- Doris Annie Bendemann, formerly Manager, European Sales, Longman's, Green and Company Ltd. For services to Export.
- Netlam Frederick Cordwell Bigg, Founder and Secretary, Stroud Festival of Religious Drama and the Arts.
- John Bilton, Honorary Secretary, Oxford Savings Committee.
- Mary Cornelia Mabel Binks, Chief School Meals Organiser, Somerset County Council.
- Robert Birchall, Head Occupational Therapist, Surrey County Council.
- Henry Noel Bleasdale, MB, ChB. For services to Swimming.
- Robert James Blofeld, County Youth Employment Officer, Hertfordshire County Council.
- Garth Blythe, Managing Director, Floform Parts Ltd, Newtown, Montgomeryshire. For services to Export.
- Charles James Howard Leslie Boon, Honorary Secretary and Treasurer, Royal Naval and Royal Marines Branch and Special Duties Officers' Benevolent Fund.
- Irene Bosworth, General Secretary, The Girls' Brigade.
- Henry Augustine Barrett Boulton, Chemist II, Royal Ordnance Factory, Cardiff, Ministry of Technology.
- Walter Arthur Bradbury, Factory Superintendent and Hospital Visiting Organiser, Lucas Gas Turbine Equipment Ltd, Birmingham.
- Alderman Robert William Brain, JP, Chairman, Coventry Road Accident Prevention Council.
- James Laurent Brighton, Member, Milk Sub-Committee of the Norfolk Agricultural Executive Committee.
- Wilfred John Brimley. For services to the Construction industry in the Midlands.
- Geoffrey Alan Charles Richbell Britton, lately Senior Executive Engineer, Radio Planning and Provision, Inland Branch, General Post Office.
- Thomas Broad, Actuary, Border Counties Trustee Savings Bank.
- John Robert Buckenham, Assistant Secretary, County Councils' Association.
- Frederick George Burman, Allowances Superintendent, British European Airways.
- Kenneth Burnip, General Works Manager, Clarke Chapman and Company Ltd, Gateshead. For services to Export.
- Daniel Bernard Burns, Higher Executive Officer, Lord Chancellor's Department.
- Ernest Busby, Clerk and Registrar to The Worshipful Society of Apothecaries of London.
- Frank Harry Bye, Staff and Administrative Assistant, Paddington, British Railways Board.
- Flight Lieutenant John Arthur Barningham Cairns, Financial Secretary, Royal Air Force Benevolent Fund.
- Alderman Samuel Capewell, Chairman, Blind Welfare Committee, Stoke-on-Trent County Borough Council.
- Evelyn Alice Carson, Executive Officer, Ministry of Defence (Army).
- Ronald Anderson Reid Chalmers, Commandant, Kingston upon Hull Special Constabulary.
- George Leslie Chapman, Chief Engineer and Designer, Armament Division, Vickers Ltd., Barrow-in-Furness.
- David Christie, Chairman, EastCentral Area Savings Committee, Scotland.
- Kathleen Dinah Clark, JP. For services to the community in Hatfield and Hertfordshire.
- Alfred George Clarke. Lately Higher Executive Officer, United Kingdom Atomic Energy Authority.
- Reginald Walter Clay, lately Divisional Staff Officer, King's Cross, Eastern Region, British Railways Board.
- Charles Henry Clements. For services to Music in Wales.
- Margaret Clugston, Matron, Glendhu Children's Hostel, Belfast.
- Patrick Varwell Collings, DSC, RD, Managing Director, Lintafoam Ltd. For services to Export.
- Edward Charles Collins, Director, City Display Productions Ltd. For services in connection with Expo 67.
- Major John Andrew Comyn, Director and Secretary, Lord Rayleigh's Farms Incorporated, Essex.
- Mary Connolly, Executive Officer, HM Treasury.
- Clifford Norman Cook, Director and Export Manager, Cow & Gate Ltd. For services to Export.
- Walter William Cook, Chief Clerk, County Antrim and City of Belfast Territorial and Auxiliary Forces Associations.
- John Maurice Cooke, Chairman, Haringey and Enfield War Pensions Committee.
- John Clifford Cooper, Probation Officer, Worcester City and County Probation Area.
- Violet Emily Corson, District Midwife, Ellesmere Port, Cheshire.
- Robert Fleming Craig, Superintendent and Deputy Chief Constable, Perth and Kinross Constabulary.
- Alan Benjamin Charles Crawley, lately Senior Executive Officer, Ministry of Social Security.
- Bridget Joan Humble-Crofts, Special Facilities Officer, Heathrow Airport, British European Airways.
- Gerald Cronin, Clerk, Newry Urban District Council.
- Kenneth Cuthbe, JP, Alderman, Essex County Council.
- Geoffrey William Dakin, TD, Chairman, Brent Schools and Colleges Savings Committee.
- Observer Commander Frank Albert Davey, Group Commandant, No. 12 Group, Royal Observer Corps.
- Walter Campbell Davidson, Manager (Naval), Machinery Installation Department, Fairfields (Glasgow) Ltd.
- Gwilym Davies, Deputy Headmaster and Head of Department of Pure Mathematics, Bishop Gore School, Swansea.
- Ivy Margery Davies, Temporary Clerical Officer (Grade 10), Foreign Office.
- David Davis, Grade 7B Officer, Dependent Territories Legal Executive Branch, Commonwealth Office.
- Edith Kate Dawson, MD, FRCS. Ed., Honorary Pathologist, Royal College of Surgeons, Edinburgh.
- John Alan Dawson, Clerk of Armagh Rural District Council.
- Major Eugene de Hinterhoff, Honorary Secretary, Military Commentators' Circle.
- Lucy Christine de la Court. Lately Matron, Queen Alexandra Hospital, Portsmouth.
- James Dewhurst, lately National Savings District Member, Bury District.
- Victor Hugh Dimick, Deputy Clerk to the Justices for the Borough of Worthing.
- Albert Osman Dolby, Proving Ground Manager, Motor Industry Research Association.
- James Donaghy, District Commandant, Ulster Special Constabulary.
- Charles Hood Goodman Drever, Trawler Skipper, Hull.
- Albert Bruce Dunkley, Marketing Director, Hayward Tyler and Company Ltd. For services to Export.
- William Wallace Dunlop, Veterinary Officer Grade 1, Ministry of Agriculture for Northern Ireland.
- Albert John Eagle, Purchasing Assistant, Norfolk Group, Eastern Electricity Board.
- Clifford Edwards, Chairman, Aberdare Local Employment Committee.
- John Selwyn Edwards, Inspector (Higher Grade), Board of Inland Revenue.
- Sidney James Edwards, Secretary, The Ball and Roller Bearing Manufacturers' Association.
- Lilian Ellis, Attached Ministry of Defence.
- Robert Llewellyn Evans, Administrative Assistant, Office of the Clerk of the Warwickshire County Council.
- Edward John Ewing, Deputy Principal Officer, Ministry of Education for Northern Ireland.
- Cyril Frank Ewins, Chairman, Birmingham Corporation Savings Committee.
- William Fairbairn, Chief Forester, Devilla Forest, Forestry Commission.
- Phyllis Amy Fairhead, Assistant Branch Director (Youth and Juniors), Birmingham Branch, British Red Cross Society.
- Daisy Mary Farr, Theatre Superintendent, Queen Elizabeth Hospital Birmingham.
- Leonard Ferguson, Housing Manager, East Kilbride Development Corporation.
- John Forman, Outside Fitting-out Manager, Vickers (Shipbuilding) Ltd.
- Malcolm Foster, Chairman, Brighouse Savings Committee.
- Barbara Fowler, Matron, Haxby Hall (Welfare Home), Haxby, Yorkshire.
- Eric Fowler, Leader writer and columnist, Eastern Daily Press, Norwich.
- Charles Richard Frangers. For services to the community in Clowne, Derbyshire.
- Bertha Freedman, Executive Officer, Ministry of Power.
- William French, JP, Consultant on Training, Darlington and Simpson Rolling Mills Ltd.
- Caroline Joyce Fryd, Founder and Editor, National Society for Mentally Handicapped Children.
- William Richard Blake Gant, Master (Higher Scale), Port Auxiliary Service, Ministry of Defence (Royal Navy).
- Isaac Stuart Garland, MM, Evening Class teacher of Upholstery, HM Borstal Institutions, Usk and Prescoed Camp.
- Thomas William Garvie, Senior Nursing Officer, Netherne Hospital, Coulsdon, Surrey.
- William Gordon Geddes, Superintendent, Guided Weapons Division, Stevenage, British Aircraft Corporation Ltd.
- Alexander George German, Senior Executive Engineer, General Post Office.
- David Harold Gidley, Chief Superintendent, Durham Constabulary, seconded to Home Office Police Research and Planning Branch.
- Edward William Gill, Member, Lancashire Agricultural Executive Committee.
- Edgar Harold Gladwin, Local Clerk Grade I, Bermuda, Ministry of Defence (Royal Navy).
- Ronald Harry Goodall, Lately Grade 3 Officer, Ministry of Labour.
- Joseph Gourlay, Chairman, Bath Savings Committee.
- John Grant, Secretary, Royal Asylum of St. Ann's Society.
- Doris Ivy Greening, Bursar at Toynbee Hall, London.
- Robert Greenwood, Technical Grade B, 43 Command Workshop, Royal Electrical and Mechanical Engineers, Ministry of Defence (Army).
- John Grundy, Managing Director, Industrial and Maritime Riggers Ltd.
- John Hull Grundy, Lately Senior Experimental Officer, Royal Army Medical College, Ministry of Defence (Army).
- Stanley Michael Bailey Hailwood. For services to Motor-cycle Racing.
- Leslie Harper, Senior Executive Officer, Board of Trade.
- Freda Elsie Harris, Higher Executive Officer, Board of Trade.
- Isaac Louis Harris. For services to the Jewish community in Leeds.
- Ralph Vincent Harris, Executive Engineer, Telephone Manager's Office, West Area, General Post Office.
- Esmond Sidney Hart, Head of Agricultural Safety Division, Royal Society for the Prevention of Accidents.
- Thomas Edward Hartnett, Clerical Officer, Ministry of Technology.
- Rex Denys Michael Hazlewood. For services to the Scout Association.
- Arthur Heathcote, JP, Councillor, Lichfield Rural District Council.
- Rose Mary Hennell, District Nurse Midwife, Surrey County Council.
- Lieutenant-Colonel Francis Arthur Henslowe, Chairman, Plymouth and District War Pensions Committee.
- Olive Heywood, Welfare Officer, Ministry of Public Building and Works.
- John Edward Henry Hicks, Director, South Wales and Monmouthshire Region, National Federation of Building Trades Employers.
- Arthur John Hills, Chairman, No. 350 (Carshalton and Wallington) Squadron Committee, Air Training Corps.
- Leslie Horace Hoare, JP. For services to the community in Wiltshire and Dorset.
- Ronald Gilbert Frederick Hodgkins, Export Sales Director, John White Footwear Ltd. For services to Export.
- Maurice Lambert Hogg, Section Naval Auxiliary Officer, Penzance Unit, Royal Naval Auxiliary Service.
- Anthony Pearson Hopkins, Executive Officer, Welsh Office.
- Frederick Horsley, Clerk to the Parish Council of Denby, Derby.
- Barbara Kathleen Horswell, Headmistress, Jessop Primary School, Lambeth.
- Ernest Howard, MM. For services to milk distribution.
- Frederick William Hudson, Chief Superintendent, Director, Police Training Courses in Crime Prevention, seconded from Gloucestershire Constabulary.
- Thomas John Hughes, Honorary Secretary, Holyhead Savings Committee.
- Arthur Edward Hull, Commercial and Development Assistant, Grimsby, British Transport Docks Board.
- Charles Edward Hutchings, Assistant Station Radio Officer, Government Communications Headquarters, Foreign Office and Commonwealth Office.
- Reginald Hutchinson, lately Aircraft Interior Designer, Hawker Siddeley Aviation Ltd.
- Reginald Edward Ibbett, Executive Engineer, Telephone Manager's Office, Brighton, General Post Office.
- William Davidson Irvine, Inspector, Dee District Salmon Fishery Board.
- Margaret Jackson, Lately Secretary to successive Mayors of the City of Lancaster.
- Guy Janson, Deputy Chairman, East Sussex Agricultural Executive Committee.
- Michael Jarrett, Managing Director, Whitecroft-Scovill Ltd, Lydney. For services to. Export.
- Bernard Neville Jefferies, Clerical Officer, Ministry of Public Building and Works.
- Hope Jennings, Chairman, Folkestone, Ashford and District War Pensions Committee.
- Arthur Joseph Thomas Jobson, JP, Member, Redditch Urban. District Council.
- Albert Harry Johnson, Administrative Officer, Merseyside and North West Safety Centre.
- Alice Sarah Johnson, JP, Alderman, Boston Borough Council.
- Frances Alice Huntingdon Johnstone, Higher Executive Officer, Scottish Development Department.
- Grace Barbara Johnstone, JP, County Director, Argyll Branch, British Red Cross Society.
- David Stanley Jones, Chief Superintendent, Gwynedd Constabulary.
- Cyril David Jordan, Managing Director, Signode Ltd, Swansea. For services to Export.
- Lionel George Kaye, Clerk of Works, Skegness Urban District Council.
- Arthur James Kendrick, Senior Lecturer and Assistant to the Head of the Mechanical, Civil and Production Engineering Department, Staffordshire College of Technology.
- William Kerr, Headmaster, Moorpark Primary School, Renfrew.
- James Colin Kewley, lately Senior Fire Service Officer, Ministry of Defence (Royal Air Force).
- Christina Girdwood Kilgour, Honorary Secretary, Scottish Epilepsy Association.
- Mabel Elizabeth King, Chairman, League of Friends of Nottingham Eye Hospital.
- Robert John Knight, Alderman, Stratford-upon-Avon Borough Council.
- George Arthur Kybird, JP, Alderman and Chairman of the Town Development Committee, Thetford Borough.
- Robert Kyle, Town Clerk, Kirkintilloch.
- Charles Robert Lane, Councillor, Northfleet Urban District Council.
- Joseph Frederick Vincent Larway, Chief Medical Photographer, United Sheffield Hospitals.
- Barry Brook Learoyd, Co-ordinator, Colour Familiarisation, British Broadcasting Corporation.
- Eliza Ferguson Legg, Organiser, Llandudno Citizens Advice Bureau.
- Frederick Lightfoot, Senior Information Officer, Exhibitions Division, Central Office of Information.
- William Edmund Liley, DSC, JP, River Thames Pilot.
- Ronald Dudley Littlewood, Export Director, Bairns-Wear Overseas Company. For services to Export.
- Hilda Laura Long, Headmistress, Children's Rest School of Recovery, Liverpool.
- Neil Moxon Longden, Superintendent Radiographer, Royal Infirmary, Edinburgh.
- John Losano, In Flight and Overseas Catering Manager, British Overseas Airways Corporation.
- Harry Loughlin, Catering Officer, MV Glenogle, Glen Line Ltd.
- Helen Lye, District Nurse, Midwife and Health Visitor, Blagdon, Somerset.
- Gerald Elwyn McArthur, District Coordinator, No. 5 District, Regional Crime Squad.
- James Campbell McFarlane, Warning Officer, Warning and Monitoring Organisation, Royal Observer Corps.
- Norman Francis McGlynn, Grade 3 Officer, Ministry of Labour.
- Florence Mary Macgown, lately Teacher of Physical Education, Selkirk High School.
- Kenneth Charles Stuart MacGreggor, Senior Clerical Assistant, Claims Office, London Transport Board.
- Philip Stanley Machent, Chief Superintendent, Manchester City Police.
- Arthur Walter McKee, J P. Chairman, North Fermanagh Savings Committee.
- William Anderson Henderson McKnight, Principal, Strandtown Primary School, Belfast.
- William McLenaghan, Senior Development Officer (Technical), British Productivity Council.
- Eileen Elizabeth McNab, Grade 7(E) Officer, Foreign Office.
- Hugh McNally, Chief Office Clerk, Vote Office, House of Commons.
- James George Macpherson, Main Grade Civil Engineer, Ministry of Transport.
- Kenneth Carmichael Magee, Group Engineer, Southend-on-Sea and Runwell Hospital Management Committees.
- John Mitchell Maitland, Administrative Manager, British Overseas Fairs Ltd. For services to Export.
- Mungo McGilchrist Malloch, Chief Pharmacist, No. 248 Maintenance Unit, RAF Chessington, Ministry of Defence (Royal Air Force).
- Leslie Betts Marley, Higher Executive Officer, Ministry of Agriculture, Fisheries and Food.
- Jean Wykeham Marr, Senior Dietician, Social Medicine Research Unit, Medical Research Council, London Hospital.
- Frank Marsden, Chairman, Leyland Savings Committee.
- Captain Douglas Gordon John Martin, Commodore Master, MV Bretwalda, Watts, Watts & Company Ltd.
- Elizabeth Matheson. For services to recreation and the community in Argyll.
- Kathleen Joan Maule, Senior Executive Officer, Ministry of Defence (Army).
- Frank Richard Meakins, Secretary, Institute for Research on Animal Diseases, Newbury, Berkshire.
- Lieutenant-Colonel Ronald Philip Menday, MC, lately Warden, Turner's Court Children's Home, Oxford.
- Arthur William Metherall, Chief Examiner of Technical Accounts, Technical Class Grade A, Ministry of Defence (Royal Navy).
- Clifford Miller, Technical Liaison Officer, Ideal Standard Ltd.
- Elsie Beatrice Mills. For services to road safety, especially for children.
- John William Mitchell, Executive Officer, Victoria and Albert Museum.
- Robert John Mitchell, Overseas Sales and Services Representative, The Rover Company Ltd. For services to Export.
- Phyllis Monk. For services to the blind.
- Robert Montgomery, County Inspector, Royal Ulster Constabulary.
- Cyril Morris, Member, Buckinghamshire Agricultural Executive Committee.
- Dudley Ellis Moss, Area Works Officer, Eastern Mediterranean Area, Commonwealth War Graves Commission.
- Major James Henry Moxham, Royal Marines (Retired), Welfare Secretary, Association of Retired Naval Officers.
- Frederick Charles Moyse, Deputy Director of Stamping, Board of Inland Revenue.
- Brendan Joseph Murphy, Headmaster, St. Cuthbert's Roman Catholic Junior School, Wigan.
- Andrew Murray, Principal Probation Officer, Coventry.
- William Joseph Hammerton Myers. For services to youth in the West Riding of Yorkshire.
- Roy Walter James Napier, National Savings District Member, Eastern Region.
- Sidney Alexander Nash, Secretary, Tree Lovers League, Birmingham.
- Sidney George Newland, JP, Barristers' Senior Clerk.
- Miriam Grace Elizabeth Newman, Senior Executive Officer, General Post Office.
- Jean Agnes Nicholson, Executive Officer, Ministry of Defence (Royal Navy).
- Captain John Nicholson, Harbour Master, King's Lynn Conservancy Board.
- John Robert Nixey, Export Sales Manager, Tempair Ltd. For services to Export.
- Ernest William Nobbs, JP, Chairman, Bournemouth, Poole and District Employment Committee.
- Marjorie Norman, Executive Officer, Ministry of Overseas Development.
- Olive Penelope, Lady Norton. For services to children and to the welfare of old people.
- Charles Walter Nunney, Training Service Officer I, Ministry of Labour.
- Johanna Mary O'Brien. Lately Ward Sister, Royal Marsden Hospital, London.
- Alexander Ogg, Officer, Glasgow, Board of Customs and Excise.
- Henry Edward Olley, Staff Officer, Board of Inland Revenue.
- Major Alexander Love Orr, lately Principal, Newtownards Further Education College, County Down.
- Doris Page (Ann Armstrong), Journalist, The Reading Evening Post. Editor, Responaut.
- Edna Grace Page, Chief Superintendent of Typists, Scrivenery Department, Royal Courts of Justice.
- George James Pallett, lately Higher Executive Officer, Home Office.
- John Stephen Reginald Parkhurst. Director, Editor and General Manager, Hampstead and Highgate Express.
- Nellie Parlett, Statistical Clerk, Joseph Lucas Ltd, Birmingham.
- Ellis Humphrey Parry, Member Merioneth County Council.
- George Alwyn Parry, Manager of Movements, Supply and Transportation Division, Shell-Mex and British Petroleum Ltd.
- Henry Parry, lately Chief Clerk, 113 (Cheshire) Field Squadron, Royal Engineers (Territorial Army).
- Beatrice Patterson. For services to the welfare of old people in Jarrow.
- Thomas Patterson, Headmaster, Harden Junior Boys' School, Co. Durham.
- Margaret Teresa Peake. Lately Sister, Downe Hospital, Downpatrick.
- Ivor Hargrave Pearcy. For services to adult education in Southampton and district.
- Hilda Winifred Peers, Executive Officer, Ministry of Technology.
- George Edgar Phelon, Joint Managing Director, David Crabtree and Son Ltd, Bradford. For services to Export.
- Harold Roy Pitman, Senior Warning Officer, Yeovil Group, Warning and Monitoring Organisation.
- Adeline Emily Pittard, Organiser, "One-in-Five Scheme", Wales, Women's Royal Voluntary Service.
- Frederick Albert Porton, Chairman, Reading War Pensions Committee.
- Leslie Stewart Pryer, Organising Secretary, Hampshire and Isle of Wight Association of Boys' Clubs.
- Kate Purdie, London Borough Organiser, Lambeth, Women's Royal Voluntary Service.
- Edmund Henry Putnam, Senior Information Officer, Central Office of Information.
- Walter Henry Rees, Honorary Secretary, Cockermouth Savings Committee.
- Agnes Reid, Welfare Officer Grade 1, North Scotland, Ministry of Defence (Royal Air Force).
- David Gildart Reid, Sales Director, John Bedford and Sons Ltd, Sheffield. For services to Export.
- Cyril Henry Robbins, Honorary Secretary, Slough Deaf Centre.
- Robert Ido Roberts, Catering Manager, Fortnum & Mason Ltd.
- William Robertson, Solicitor, Motherwell.
- Hubert Stanley Rule, District Secretary (Wirral and West Cheshire District), Amalgamated Engineering Union.
- Cecil Herbert Russell, Member, Strabane Urban District Council.
- Betty Madalme Samuels, Lady Superintendent, Convalescent Police Seaside Home, Hove, Sussex.
- Eve Saville, General Secretary, Institute for the Study and Treatment of Delinquency.
- Claude Vernon Sawyer, Inspector of Taxes, Board of Inland Revenue.
- Herbert Morrison Scott, High Technical Grade "A", Ministry of Public Building and Works.
- Alderman William Edward Shapland. For services to local government and education in Tiverton, Devon.
- William Emil Shapley, Editor, Fruit, Flower and Vegetable Trades' Journal.
- George Reginald Shilling. Lately Assistant Head Postmaster, Warwick and Leamington Head Post Office.
- Alfred Hector Shotter, Senior Executive Officer, Ministry of Social Security.
- Reginald Slater, JP, Local Director and General Manager, Whessoe Ltd, Darlington. For services to Export.
- Albert Victor Smith, Area Produce Buyer, Portsmouth, Navy, Army and Air Force Institutes.
- Annie Smith, Ward Sister, Meanwood Park Hospital, Leeds.
- Ernest Donald Smith, JP, Chairman, Cumberland and Westmorland Playing Fields Association.
- Frederick George Smith, lately Chief Vehicle Examiner, South Eastern Traffic Area, Ministry of Transport.
- John Smith, Formerly Councillor, Longridge Urban District Council.
- Cecil George Soames, Agriculture Officer and District Organiser, Eastern Counties, Transport and General Workers' Union.
- Philip Arthur Stalker. Lately Journalist, The Scotsman.
- John Albert Stansbie, Experimental Officer, Royal Ordnance Factory, Chorley, Ministry of Defence (Army).
- Grace Winifred Clara Stretton, Headmistress, Holbrook Junior Girls' School, Gosport.
- Dorothy Nancy Stroud, Inspectress, Sir John Soane's Museum.
- Hilda Stuttard, Headmistress, Cowper Street Infants' School, Leeds.
- Jane Alice Sugden. Lately Matron, Belmont Hospital, Tiverton, Devon.
- William Henry Tarn, Industrial and Commercial Gas Engineer, Wales Gas Board.
- Barbara Tarratt. Lately Old People's Welfare Organiser for Lancashire.
- Cyril Bernard Vincent Taylor. For services to local government in Wolverhampton.
- Doris Taylor, Higher Executive Officer, Ministry of Social Security.
- Kathleen Mary Tew, Treasurer, National Association for Employment of Regular Sailors, Soldiers and Airmen.
- George Ailwyn Tracker, Secretary, Suffolk Mental Hospitals Management Committee.
- Mary Thistlethwaite, Superintendent of Home Nurses, Manchester County Borough Council.
- William John Thomas, lately Headmaster, Alltwen Junior Mixed School, Glamorgan.
- William John Thomas, Civil Defence Officer, Cardiff County Borough.
- Anthony Charles Thorne, Managing Director, Spembly Technical Products Ltd. For services to Export.
- Thomas William Thurgood, Executive Officer, Department of Economic Affairs.
- Bernard Howard Townsend, Clerk to the Wye River Authority.
- Henry Turner, Organiser of Technical Subjects, Ayrshire Education Committee.
- Enid Twigley, Headmistress, Brownlow Fold County Primary School, Bolton.
- Captain Leslie Joseph Unsworth, Master, Caledonian Steam Packet Company (Irish Services), British Railways Board.
- Noel Hamilton Forbes Unwin, Security Officer II, Royal Aircraft Establishment, Farnborough, Ministry of Technology.
- Mary Edgar Urquhart, Assistant Administrator, Northern Division (Scotland), Women's Royal Voluntary Service.
- Gladys Lydia Vaughan, Headmistress, Hallmoor Educationally Sub-Normal Special School, Birmingham.
- Thomas Sykes Wagstaffe, Clerical Officer, Ministry of Health.
- William Walter, Crown Agents' Resident Representative in West Africa.
- John William Wardle, JP, Independent Member of the Joint Steering Group on British Railways.
- Arthur Waterhouse, Valuation Clerk (Higher Grade), Board of Inland Revenue.
- John Oliver Watkins, JP, Chairman of the Swansea Branch of the Magistrates' Association.
- Walter George Watson, Senior Executive Officer, Forestry Commission.
- Alice Mary Watts, Chairman, Nottingham Ladies and Street Groups Savings Committee.
- Margaret Maud Webb, Assistant Secretary, Royal Society of Medicine.
- Milton Webster, Chairman and Managing Director, Myers Webster and Company Ltd, Pudsey, Yorkshire. For services to Export.
- Arthur Joseph Wellings, Factory Manager, Dynamo and Starter Factory, Joseph Lucas (Electrical) Ltd. For services to Export.
- Eric John Burdick West, Assistant County Surveyor, Devon County Council.
- Wilmot Wilcox, Lately Area Production Manager, West Midlands Division, National Coal Board.
- Jane Duncan Wilkie, Secretary, Scottish Section, Co-operative Union Ltd.
- Admiral Edward Williams, Regional Horticultural Marketing Inspector, Ministry of Agriculture, Fisheries and Food.
- Betty Williams, Lately Head of Records, Emergency Bed Service.
- Catherine Ellen Williams. For services to the community in Llanfairpwll.
- John Williams. For services to the London Welsh Community.
- John Williams, Male Charge Nurse, Queen Mary's Hospital, Sidcup.
- Muriel Mary Williams, Grade 3 Officer, Ministry of Labour.
- Captain Archibald Mitchell Williamson, Master, MV Ernebank, Andrew Weir and Company Ltd.
- Benjamin Wilson. For services to the breeding of Blackface sheep.
- William Robertson Wilson, County Organiser, Devon Federation of Young Farmers' Clubs.
- Edith Christina Woods, Hammersmith Borough Member, London Regional Savings Committee.
- Percy William Edward. Woods, Honorary Secretary and Managing Director, Industrial Therapy Organisation (Epsom) Ltd.
- Richard John Young, Licensing Manager, Agricultural Division, Imperial Chemical Industries Ltd. For services to Export.
- Astrid Zydower, Sculptor. For services in connection with Expo '67.

Diplomatic Service and Overseas List

- Gordon Cassie Adams, lately Colombo Plan Adviser, Pakistan.
- John Draper Adshead, lately Assistant Surveyor-General, Northern States, Nigeria.
- Bernard Alfred Attwood, Her Majesty's Vice-Consul, Lubumbashi.
- Ronald William Balfour, JP, Town Clerk, Suva City Council, Fiji.
- Herbert Vmters Barnard, lately Deputy Director of Audit, Federation of South Arabia.
- Walter James Batt, Pro-Consul, Her Majesty's Consulate-General, Seville.
- Marjorie Louise Bean, Education Officer, Bermuda.
- Pamela Anne Beavis, Personal Assistant to Her Majestv's Ambassador Kinshasa.
- Walter Newbigging Birks, British Subject resident in Libya.
- Adeline Brown, lately Personal Secretary to Chairman, Public Services Commission, Aden.
- Henry Woodroffe Buckley, British Subject resident in Spain.
- Grace Wallace Hamilton Calogeroplos, Accountant, Her Majesty's Consulate-General, Boston.
- Cheung Shui-kwai, Senior Education Officer, Hong Kong.
- Frederick William James Cooper, lately Her Majesty's Consul, Aleppo.
- Vilna Margaret McIntosh-Clarke Cox. For services to the community in Saint Vincent.
- Charles James Gordon Davey, lately Principal Technical Officer, Nigeria.
- Alan Roland Denny, lately Assistant Commissioner, South Arabian Police Force.
- Alec Walter Dexter, Commercial Officer, Her Majesty's Consulate-General, Chicago.
- David Douglas Elder, Correspondent for British High Commissioner in Malawi.
- Fong Yun-wah. For services to the community in Hong Kong.
- Fanny Friedman, MB, BCh (Mrs. Carrington), Medical Officer in charge, Hlatikulu Hospital, Swaziland.
- Patrick Terence O'Kelly Gardner, lately British Vice-Consul, Cairo.
- Doris Annie Garton, Second Secretary (Information), Her Majesty's Embassy, Bonn.
- Timothy Gibson, Assistant Inspector (Music), Ministry of Education, Bahama Islands.
- Geoffrey Ashall Glaister, British Council Chief Librarian, Pakistan.
- Goh Kong-hooi, Controller of Posts, Hong Kong.
- Mary Elizabeth Gold, Shorthand-typist, Her Majesty's Embassy, Bonn.
- Cyril James Hall, Establishment Secretary, Botswana.
- Norman Henry George Hill, Ballistics Officer, Hong Kong Police Force.
- Frank Bernard Holroyd, Administration Officer, Office of the British Chargé d'Affaires, Peking.
- Charles Richard Horrell, lately Technical Assistance Officer, Bolivia.
- David Michael Horsburgh, British Subject resident in India.
- Norman Ions, lately British Consul, Macao.
- George Frederick Jack, lately Permanent Secretary, Ministry of Communications and Works, Saint Vincent.
- Peter Auxlien Joseph, BEM. For services to education and to the community in Saint Lucia.
- Ratu Jone Kikau, lately Head of Fijian Administration, Tailevu Province, Fiji.
- Kwong Ming-kong. For public services in Hong Kong.
- Lam Chik-ho. For services to the community in Hong Kong.
- Percy Sidney Leeds, lately Officer in charge of Diplomatic Wireless Service Detachment at Her Majesty's Embassy, Kinshasa.
- Gertrude Vera Lentle, lately Nursing Sister (acting Deputy Matron), Queen Elizabeth Hospital, Aden.
- Albert Robert von Leyden, British Subject lately resident in India.
- Geoffrey Colin Livesey, Grade 10 Officer, Her Majesty's Consulate-General, Hanoi.
- Sarah Lizabeth Livingstone, Matron, Woodlands Nursing Home, Calcutta.
- Fredrick Llambias, Chief Superintendent of Police, Gibraltar.
- Ann Virginia Macdonald, Personal Assistant to Head of Chancery, Office of the British Chargé d'Affaires, Peking.
- Julian Philip Martial, Comptroller of Inland Revenue, Saint Lucia.
- Ruth Maynard, Island Commissioner for Girl Guides, Saint Christopher-Nevis-Anguilla.
- Eileen Louise Mestern, Personal Assistant to the Commissioner of Police, Malaysia.
- Jean Raeburn Murray, Theatre Superintendent, Mulago Hospital, Uganda.
- Spencer Enraght Nettleton, Private Secretary to the Prime Minister, Lesotho.
- Ng Kwong-yuen, Senior Education Officer, Hong Kong.
- Bertrand Beresford Osborne. For voluntary public services in Montserrat.
- Charles Robert Cary Owtram, Senior Local Courts Commissioner, Malawi.
- Mark Patey, District Officer, Swaziland.
- Eric Romulus Pereira, Supervisor, Grade IV, Sha Tin Auxiliary Medical Services Unit, Hong Kong.
- Archibald Carmichael Philip, District Officer, Kano, Nigeria.
- Ernest Conrad Pickering. For public services in the Virgin Islands.
- John Humbertson Pilgrim. For services to the community in Saint Lucia.
- Helen Monica Plumtre, Headmistress, Senior Staff School, University of Ibadan, Nigeria.
- Harold Joseph Potter, DSC, Commercial Officer, Her Majesty's Consulate-General, New York.
- Peter Desmond Proude, lately Chief Fisheries Officer, Uganda.
- Leslie Punter, Senior Architect, Federal Ministry of Works and Housing, Nigeria.
- Gerald Francis Range, Second Secretary (Commercial), Her Majesty's Embassy, Kabul.
- Michael Rapasia. For public services in the British Solomon Islands Protectorate.
- Patrick John Rewcastle, Superintendent of Police, Sabah Component, Royal Malaysia Police.
- Thomas Allan Jersdal Ridpath, Vice-Consul, Her Majesty's Embassy, Copenhagen.
- Francis Walter Rowland, Archivist, Her Majesty's Embassy, Tokyo.
- Alfred William Henry Rumsey, Accountant, British High Commission, New Delhi.
- Shum Choi-sang. For services to the community in Hong Kong.
- Dorothy Mary Smith, Missionary Sister-in-Charge, Churches of Christ Mission Clinic, Ranmawat, South Pentecost, New Hebrides.
- Grace Verna Spencer, British Subject resident in Kenya.
- Victor Henry Spencer, British Subject lately resident in Aden.
- Kenneth Stather, RD, Fishing Master, Hong Kong.
- William Douglas Stump, Administration Officer, Her Majesty's Consulate, Lubumbashi.
- Henry William Sturdy, British Trade Commissioner and Head of Post in Regina, Saskatchewan.
- Peter John Talbot, Diplomatic Wireless Service Officer, Office of the British Chargé d'Affaires, Peking.
- Laurence Douglas Tennant, Chief Game Warden, Uganda.
- Eva Lilian Thomson, British Subject resident in Kenya.
- John Charles Trout, Assistant Commissioner of Police, Nigeria.
- Tsui Tim-fook, Labour Officer, Hong Kong.
- Lilian Marie Vranek, Grade 9 Officer, Her Majesty's Embassy, Rome.
- Lottie Evelyn Gladys Waight. For voluntary public service and social welfare work in British Honduras.
- Harry Charles Walters, British Subject resident in South Africa.
- Alan John Waple, Director, News Division, British Information Services, New York.
- James Victor Waterworth, Assistant Chief Agricultural Officer, Mid-Western Nigeria.
- James Bentley Watson, MC, Assistant Commissioner of Police, Uganda.
- Peter Raymond Weare, Senior Agricultural Officer (Research), Botswana.
- Alfred Ernest Leopold Williams, Permanent Secretary, Ministry of Public Works and Communications, Antigua. For voluntary services to community.
- William Norris Williams, Chief Engineer, Federal Institute of Industrial Research, Oshodi, Nigeria.
- Walter Ronald Wood, Senior Technical Officer, Western Nigeria.
- Margaret Woodland, Missionary nursing sister in Nigeria.
- Gideon Pitabose Zoleveke, DSM, DCMHE, Medical Officer, Grade II, British Solomon Islands Protectorate.

State of New South Wales

- Thomas Lyall Goodman. For services to journalism.
- Doris Mary Hirst. For services to the community, particularly in the field of music.
- Alderman Arthur Lambert, of Queanbeyan. For services to the community, particularly in the field of local government.
- Albert Thomas Lenehan. For services to the community.
- The Reverend Mother Agnes May McGahey. For outstanding services among the sick and poor.
- Anthony Robert Miller. For services to sport, particularly Rugby Union.
- Francis Oswald Oliver, MM. For services to ex-servicemen.
- Clive Stephen Nicholson. For services to the community, particularly in the field of sport.
- Godfrey Monk Stirling. For services to the community, particularly in the field of music.
- Colin Farquhar Watson. For services to the Boy Scout Movement.
- Frank Lionel Watts. For services to the community, particularly in the field of rehabilitation of physically handicapped people.
- Ellen Mary Kent Wilson, MB, BS (Dr. Ellen Kent Hughes). For services to the community, particularly as general medical practitioner for many years.

State of Victoria

- Richard Jacob Attrill. For services to the community, particularly to sick and crippled children.
- Ruby Robertson Barclay. For charitable and welfare services to the community.
- Ulick Lord Daly, JP. For services to local government.
- Frederick William Dods, of Kew. For local government services.
- Walter Albert Fordham, JP, of Camberwell. For local government and community services.
- Charles Henry Gould, MM. For services to the community.
- Frank Reginald Harrison, JP. For services to the community, particularly to local government.
- Isaac Roy Humphrys, JP, President of the Shire of Belfast.
- Arthur Ernest Ireland, JP. For services to local government and to youth.
- Edna Mavis Jackson. For services to the community.
- Kenneth Nelson King, Mayor of the Borough of Kyabram.
- John Oakley Parker, Chairman, Religious Centre Appeal Committee, Monash University.
- Arthur Mervyn Pearson, of Omeo. For local government and community services.
- Margaret Elizabeth Tucker. For welfare services to the aborigines.

State of Queensland

- Alexander William Chalmers, MB, of Goondiwindi. For services to the community, particularly among the sick and suffering.
- Georgina May Clavin. For welfare services to the community.
- Richard Leonard Dunstan. For services to the Friendly Societies Movement.
- Isobel Betty Hilton. For services to the community, particularly as a Spastics teacher and worker.
- James Henry Leavy. For outstanding services to the fruit and vegetable industries.
- John Thomas Neill. For local government and community services.
- Alice Meech. For services to the community, particularly as a member of the Warwick Corps of the Salvation Army.
- Roland Tyrwhitt St. John. For services to the community, particularly as Registrar and Secretary of the Anglican Diocese, Brisbane.
- Horatio Nelson Whitaker. For services to the sugar industry, and to port administration.

State of South Australia

- Winifred Ivy Phillips. For services to the community, particularly to the Women's Auxiliary, Queen Victoria Maternity Hospital.

State of Western Australia

- Aubrey Alexander Hardie. For services to the pastoral industry.
- William Harwood. For services to the community, particularly to handicapped citizens.
- Thomas Naylor Hogg, JP, of Narrogin. For services to local government and community affairs.
- Ivy Mary Kent, JP. For social welfare services particularly in respect of women and children.
- Claude Edwin Maley, JP. For local government and community services.
- Gwen Garnet Plaistowe. For services to the community, particularly in the field of Mental Health.

State of Tasmania

- Myra Carney. For charitable and community welfare services.
- Lisle Christian Palliser Wilson. For services to the community over many years.
- Mervyn Houghton Wright. For services to the community, particularly in the field of local government.

=== Order of the Companions of Honour (CH) ===
- The Right Honourable John, Baron Boyd Orr, DSO, MC. For services to Human and Animal Nutrition.
- The Reverend Ernest Alexander Payne, General Secretary, Baptist Union of Great Britain and Ireland. For services to the British and World Councils of Churches.
- The Right Honourable Lionel Charles, Baron Robbins, CB. For services to the Arts and to Learning.

=== Companions of the Imperial Service Order (ISO) ===
Home Civil Service

- Eric Arthur Bibby, Chief Executive Officer, Ministry of Transport.
- Arthur Frederick Boreham, Grade 2 Officer, Ministry of Labour.
- David John Carter, Principal, Ministry of Social Security.
- Edward William George Dolan, Principal, Board of Trade.
- Aidan Herbert, Healy, Senior Estate Surveyor, Ministry of Public Building and Works.
- Henry William Hewitt, Deputy Controller of Death Duties, Board of Inland Revenue.
- William Orpin Jennings, Chief Experimental Officer, National Physical Laboratory, Ministry of Technology.
- Thomas Johnston, MRCVS, Divisional Veterinary Officer, Ministry of Agriculture, Fisheries and Food.
- Arthur Horace Cyril Knox, Chief Regional Engineer, South Eastern Region, Headquarters, General Post Office.
- Ronald Melville, Senior Principal Scientific Officer, Ministry of Agriculture, Fisheries and Food.
- Thomas Augustus Moy, Chief Executive Officer, Home Office.
- George Navey, Senior Chief Executive Officer, Ministry of Defence (Army).
- Mary Jessie MacDonald Noble, Principal Scientific Officer, Department of Agriculture and Fisheries for Scotland.
- Leslie Pearson, Chemist 1, Aircraft Production Division, Ministry of Technology.
- Hugh Kingsley Prout, lately Assistant Director of Studies and Head of the Mathematics Department, Britannia Royal Naval College, Dartmouth, Ministry of Defence (Royal Navy).
- Alfred Charles Ralph, Principal, Board of Customs and Excise.
- William Edward Cole Richards, Principal Examiner, Board of Trade.
- Walter Riste, Chief Executive Officer, Ministry of Social Security.
- Thomas Bernard Surr, lately Chief Executive Officer, Ministry of Public Building and Works.
- Herbert George Charles Sutliffe, Principal, Ministry of Housing and Local Government.
- John Allan Thompstone, First Class Valuer, Board of Inland Revenue.
- Leslie Frederick Weatherhead, lately Deputy Staff Controller, London Postal Region, General Post Office.
- Leslie Alfred Webb, lately Deputy Master, Melbourne Branch, Royal Mint.

Diplomatic Service and Overseas List

- Lai Kee-leung, lately Superintendent of Urban Services, Hong Kong.
- Lam Po-hon, General Manager, Kowloon-Canton Railway, Hong Kong.
- Lesley Charles Millington, Chief Preventive Officer, Hong Kong.

State of New South Wales

- George Henry Giles Goscombe. Architect, Department of Public Works.

State of Queensland

- Eric Clarke Jamieson Muir. Chief Commissioner of Lands.

State of South Australia

- John Robert Dunsford. Director of Lands, South Australia.

=== British Empire Medals (BEM) ===
Military Division

Royal Navy

- Aircraft Artificer 1st Class (A/E) William Aird L/FX 669569.
- Chief Petty Officer Stores Accountant (S) Dudley James Maurice Banger, P/MX 47882.
- Chief Petty Officer (PRI) Reginald Walter George Beaver, P/JX 246342.
- Colour Sergeant Bugler Colin Ernest Bowden, Po/X 5690, Royal Marines.
- Chief Electrical Mechanician (Air) Dennis Broadley, L/FX 788521.
- Chief Petty Officer (Steward) Bernard Leslie Cooper, P/LX 782282.
- Chief Petty Officer Bertram Louis Cross, D/JX 144544.
- Master-at-Arms Eric Lionel Matthews Davis D/MX 802510.
- Head Naval Nurse Marea Mary Dickinson, 0003, Queen Alexandra's Royal Naval Nursing Service.
- Chief Engine Room Artificer Thomas Henry Ellis, MX 637825.
- Chief Petty Officer (GI) Douglas Arthur Thomas Plunder, D/JX 158312 (on loan to the Royal Malaysian Navy).
- Chief Ordnance Electrical Artificer David James Foale, P/MX 510795.
- Chief Petty Officer Writer William George Francis, P/MX 807571.
- Chief Radio Electrician (Air) James Gilbod, L/FX 842324.
- Shipwright Artificer 1st Class Lawrence George Gorsuch, P/MX 635559 (formerly serving with the Royal Navy Training Team, Kenya).
- Chief Petty Officer Leonard Kenneth Harry, D/JX 161799.
- Chief Wren Welfare Worker Edith Mabel Husted, 24968, Women's Royal Naval Service.
- Chief Petty Officer (GLI) Francis Lionel Arthur Keld, P/JX 153012.
- Chief Aircraft Artificer Thomas George Edward Alford Lang, L/FX 669070.
- Petty Officer Pumpman James MacDonald, Royal Fleet Auxiliary Service.
- Chief Painter James Lawrence McDonald, D/MX 56657.
- Chief Petty Officer (GLI) James Mackie, D/JX 143255.
- Master-at-Arms Cyril George Martin, P/MX 833706 (formerly serving with the Royal Navy Training Team, Kenya).
- Chief Mechanician Norman Arthur Payne, P/KX 803006.
- Chief Radio Electrical Artificer Benjamin Pescod, P/MX 801603.
- Chief Petty Officer (Coxswain) Norman James Poole, P/JX 581678.
- Chief Mechanician Leonard Henry Reeve, P/KX 869123.
- Quartermaster Sergeant Peter Leask Simpson, RM 8073, Royal Marines.
- Chief Engine Room Artificer George Charles Beatty Steele, P/MX 56726.
- Marine Brendon Desmond White, Po/X 6480, Royal Marines.
- Chief Radio Supervisor Cecil Ernest Wilding, Q.999011, Royal Naval Reserve.
- Chief Ordnance Electrical Artificer (L) Richard John Wyatt, P/MX 57649.

Army

- 22021507 Staff Sergeant Joseph Adlington, The Royal Inniskilling Fusiliers.
- 22264038 Sergeant Peter Roy Austin, Corps of Royal Electrical and Mechanical Engineers.
- 22660342 Staff Sergeant Frederick Malcolm Bishop, Royal Pioneer Corps.
- 14083699 Staff Sergeant (acting) Raymond Dennis Coughtrey, Army Catering Corps.
- 23533219 Staff Sergeant (acting) Kenneth Graham Day, Intelligence Corps.
- 22242746 Staff Sergeant Rodney Goodman, Royal Corps of Signals.
- 23491042 Sergeant Brian John Gormley, 11th Hussars (Prince Alberts Own).
- 22827095 Sergeant Ronald Hackett, Corps of Royal Military Police.
- 22223473 Staff Sergeant (acting) Ronald George Hill, Royal Corps of Transport.
- 22279316 Staff Sergeant Reginald Hooson, The Royal Welch Fusiliers, Territorial and Army Volunteer Reserve.
- 22796189 Sergeant (acting) Arthur Hugill, Royal Army Ordnance Corps.
- 22274245 Staff Sergeant (acting) James Jack, Royal Army Ordnance Corps.
- 22246292 Staff Sergeant Ian Henry Jarvis, Corps of Royal Electrical and Mechanical Engineers.
- 22562079 Staff Sergeant (acting) Albert Kershaw, Royal Corps of Transport.
- 2549084 Staff Sergeant (acting) Michael Frederick Henry Knight, Corps of Royal Electrical and Mechanical Engineers.
- 22570448 Staff Sergeant Donald Matthews, Royal Army Ordnance Corps.
- 22215378 Sergeant William Muir, Scots Guards.
- 888378 Corporal George Currie Murray, Scots Guards.
- 22994543 Staff Sergeant Michael Gerald Noblett, Royal Army Ordnance Corps.
- 23954635 Corporal Clive Russell Osborn, Corps of Royal Engineers.
- 23655675 Staff Sergeant Ralph Edward Pedder, Corps of Royal Engineers, Territorial and Army Volunteer Reserve (now retired).
- 19157026 Staff Sergeant (acting) George Alexander Renton, Royal Army Medical Corps.
- 22122613 Staff Sergeant David Percival Finlay Fawcus Robinson, Intelligence Corps.
- 21060566 Warrant Officer Class II (acting) Ronald Roe, Army Catering Corps.
- LS/4915089 Sergeant Noel Ross, MM, The Parachute Regiment.
- 23490974 Sergeant Joseph Hubert Sampays, Royal Corps of Transport.
- 23707698 Sergeant John Arthur Scrutton, Royal Corps of Signals.
- 22954836 Warrant Officer Class II (acting) Barry Smith, The Somerset and Cornwall Light Infantry.
- 21016187 Staff Sergeant John Allen Francis Smith, Royal Corps of Transport, Territorial and Army Volunteer Reserve.
- 22288524 Staff Sergeant (acting) Thomas McKenzie Stephenson, Royal Regiment of Artillery, formerly serving with the South Arabian Army.
- 23709279 Corporal Gordon Eric Thompson, Corps of Royal Engineers.
- 4627719 Staff Sergeant Leonard Wilkinson, The Prince of Wales's Own Regiment of Yorkshire.
- 19038495 Staff Sergeant (acting) George Woolfson, Royal Horse Artillery.
- 23252389 Sergeant Douglas John Worsfold, Grenadier Guards.
- Overseas Award Sergeant Walter Percival Lamb, British Honduras Volunteer Guard.

Royal Air Force

- V2086557 Flight Sergeant Freda Alice Bass, Women's Royal Air Force.
- R1921379 Flight Sergeant Joseph Christopher Boyd.
- N0977113 Flight Sergeant Gilbert Colledge.
- E0592242 Flight Sergeant Ivor Charles Easton.
- L2035595 Flight Sergeant Winifred Frances Edmonds, Women's Royal Air Force.
- U4021042 Flight Sergeant Robert Foggon, Royal Air Force Regiment. For services while on loan to the Kenya Air Force.
- U2355816 Flight Sergeant John Harwood.
- P0727075 Flight Sergeant (Acting Warrant Officer) William Vincent John Higgins.
- D4013045 Flight Sergeant John Knowles.
- P0535706 Flight Sergeant (Acting Warrant Officer) Edwin Lewis Morgan.
- D1909821 Flight Sergeant William O'Connell.
- E0575346 Flight Sergeant Patrick O'Shea.
- P4048991 Flight Sergeant William Henry Stephen Sharp.
- E1921486 Acting Flight Sergeant Patrick Peter Bonner.
- C4018796 Acting Flight Sergeant Daniel Byrne.
- F0626435 Acting Flight Sergeant Ernest Jack Cooper.
- Y4026940 Chief Technician Ronald Beddow.
- P1922597 Chief Technician John Michael Brown.
- F0579879 Chief Technician Arthur Stanley Carter.
- H0586251 Chief Technician Ronald Edward Dallas.
- Y1921231 Chief Technician Philip Ivor Ellis.
- M1160633 Chief Technician Reginald Edward Harrison.
- N4012064 Chief Technician Arthur Loader.
- G1035464 Chief Technician Ronald Alfred Moore.
- J4063543 Chief Technician Gordon Richard Palin.
- W0620154 Chief Technician Douglas Charles Edwin Ponsford.
- J4033292 Chief Technician Kenneth Sykes.
- G4012338 Sergeant Edward Elwyn Bevan.
- D2231774 Sergeant Roy Victor Bickley.
- R4105565 Sergeant Gareth Mark Swan Brown.
- H4184878 Sergeant Geoffrey Charles Butler.
- V2490244 Sergeant Derek Ivor Payne, Royal Air Force Regiment.
- K0592578 Corporal Raymond Ivor Bowden.
- V4139447 Corporal Alexander Grant.
- L4237237 Corporal Charles Rex Turner.
- W4249663 Junior Technician Donald Findley Spence.

Civil Division

United Kingdom

- Clara Ellen Aldam, Member of Clothing Centre Staff, Chesterfield, Women's Royal Voluntary Service.
- Walter Boyd Allen, Ambulance Driver, Langholm, St. Andrew's Scottish Ambulance Service.
- Edith Eleanor Avey, Bees Officer, Ministry of Agriculture, Fisheries and Food.
- Edwin Arthur Richard Baker, Foreman, H. Mount and Sons, Ltd, Kent.
- Harry Frederick Baker, Chief Instructor, St. Loyes College for the Training and Rehabilitation of the Disabled, Exeter.
- William Banner, Craftsman, Leicester Gasworks, East Midlands Gas Board.
- Hester Bannon, Honorary Collector, Street Savings Group, Pomeroy, Co. Tyrone.
- Herbert L. Barker, Turner, Avimo Ltd, Taunton.
- Ean MacKenzie Berkley-Barton, Assistant Civil Defence Officer, West Sussex.
- William Bate, Master, Varne Light Vessel, Corporation of Trinity House.
- Charles Thomas Bedford, Chargehand (Fitter), 29 Command Workshop, Royal Electrical and Mechanical Engineers, Ministry of Defence (Army).
- William Bell, Foreman, Laboratory Workshop, Ferranti Ltd, Edinburgh.
- Arthur Norman Bennett, Maintenance Engineer, Plymouth Laboratory, Marine Biological Association.
- Reginald William Leslie Bird, Technical Grade III, 29 Command Workshop, Royal Electrical and Mechanical Engineers, Ministry of Defence (Army).
- Winifred Annie Bishop, Woman Chief Inspector, Sheffield and Rotherham Constabulary.
- George Edward Blackmore, DCM, Inspector, Metropolitan Police.
- Lily Eva Blank, Cook, Treherbert Hospital, Rhondda.
- Ernest Bond, Materials Controller, Birch Coppice Colliery, South Midlands Area National Coal Board.
- Stanley Charles Bond, Principal Lightkeeper, Radio Beacon Station, Cregneish, Isle of Man.
- Margaret Ledgewood Bousfield, Chief Officer II, HM Borstal, Bullwood Hall.
- George Bower, Commandant, Rotherham Special Constabulary.
- Edwin Haddon Boyce, Foundry Machinist, Stanton and Staveley Ltd, Chesterfield.
- Catherine Boyle, Commandant, Glasgow South Co-operative Section, St. Andrew's Ambulance Corps.
- Harold Bradshaw, School Staff Instructor, Campbell College Combined Cadet Force, Belfast.
- Fanny Maria Brewer, Honorary Collector, Street Savings Group, Maesteg.
- Dudley Raymond Brown, Principal Photographer, Electrical Inspection Directorate, Ministry of Technology.
- John Thomas Brown, Railway Yard Foreman, Royal Corps of Transport, Ministry of Defence (Army).
- William Brown, Porter, Royal Free Hospital, London.
- George Bucksey, Rigger, HMS Daedalus.
- John Bertram Burridge, Transport Supervisor, HM Embassy, Tehran.
- Thompson Butt, Deputy Rescue Company Officer, Civil Defence Corps, Newcastle upon Tyne.
- Martha Annie Buxton, Honorary Collector, Street Savings Group, Heanor.
- George Harry Capel, JP, Engine Driver, Barnstaple, Western Region, British Railways Board.
- Dudley William Cass, Senior Superintendent, Sudbury factory, C.A.V.
- Daniel Dixon Cathcart, Joiner, Cammell Laird & Co.
- Denis Albert Causon, Canteen Manager, Navy, Army & Air Force Institutes, Beihan, Aden.
- Charlotte Chamberlain, Sub Postmistress, Castle Ashby Sub Post Office, Northampton.
- Eric Geoffrey Chandler, JP, lately Engineering Technical Grade II, Royal Aircraft Establishment, Ministry of Technology.
- Mary Elizabeth Harriet Clarkson, Honorary Collector, Middleham Savings Group, Yorkshire.
- Daisy Irene Constable, Member, Civil Defence Corps, St. Albans, Hertfordshire.
- Hilda Consterdine, Member, Nottingham County Borough Staff, Women's Royal Voluntary Service.
- George Henry Cook, Electrical Fitter, Ministry of Defence (Royal Navy).
- Eric Brough Cooper, Underground Development Worker, Whitwell Colliery, North Derbyshire Area, National Coal Board.
- Jessie Keturah Potter Cornwall, Honorary Collector, Village Savings Groups, North Marston/Winslow, Buckinghamshire.
- Stanley Albert Cowing, Chief Steward, Officers Mess, Infantry Training Centre, Royal Marines, Ministry of Defence (Navy).
- James McCormack Crawford, Motor Driver, Gushetfaulds Freightliner Depot, Scottish Region, British Railways Board.
- Jack Willerton Creasy, Assistant Foreman, Electric Power Storage Ltd, Swinton.
- Wilfred John Davey, Fitter-in-Charge, St. Austell, Cornwall, South Western Gas Board.
- Alexander Albert Davidson, Inspector, Thames Division, Metropolitan Police.
- David Davies, Leading Moulder, Brown, Lenox & Co. Ltd.
- David Thomas Davies, Sample Passer, Brymbo Steel Works.
- Laurence Herbert Davies, Non-Technical Grade II, Weapons Group, Aldermaston, United Kingdom Atomic Energy Authority.
- Percy Leonard Day, Fourth Assistant Engineer, Transmission Operation and Maintenance Department, East Midlands Division, Midlands Region, Central Electricity Generating Board.
- Joseph William Deuchar, Observer, Secondary Training Base Manchester, Royal Observer Corps.
- Lawrence Dickinson, Foreman Joiner, Bickershaw Colliery, North Western Area, National Coal Board.
- Charles George Dixon, Grab Driver, Hull, British Transport Docks Board.
- Thomas William Dodds, Chargehand, Wm. Crockatt & Son Ltd, Glasgow.
- William Elias. For services to coracle fishing.
- Albert Evans, Boatswain, SS Ajax, Alfred Holt & Co. Ltd.
- Elsie Fearnyough, Group Officer, Liverpool Fire Brigade.
- Herbert Leonard Francis, Assistant Foreman, Guided Weapons Division, British Aircraft Corporation Ltd.
- Catherine Freebody, Warden, Ripon House Hostel for Girls, Leeds.
- John Alfred Gale, Inspector of Boom Depot Workpeople, Ministry of Defence (Navy).
- William Gallagher, Craft Foreman, Reactor Group, Risley, United Kingdom Atomic Energy Authority.
- Gertrude Gillabrand, Photoprinter, Home Office.
- Ronald Ginnever (Senior), First Class Gasfitter, Sheffield District, East Midlands Gas Board.
- Maurice Ernest Gooding, Road Accident Prevention Officer, Taunton Rural District Council.
- Thomas Morgan Griffiths, Dock Gate Foreman, Cardiff Docks.
- Olive Doris Hack, Honorary Collector, Street Savings Group, Old Woking.
- Alexander Haire, Sergeant, Royal Ulster Constabulary.
- Dennis Hambleton, Deputy Chief Inspector, Wardle and Davenport Ltd, Leek.
- John Harland, Chief Steward, SS Methane Princess, Shell Tankers (U.K.) Ltd.
- Arthur Laurence Harris, Principal Foreman of Stores, RAF Quedgeley, Ministry of Defence (Royal Air Force).
- Lyallie Birbeck Harrison, Centre Organiser, Felling Urban District, Women's Royal Voluntary Service.
- Vera Mabel Heard, Warden, Carpenter House Hostel for Girls, Birmingham.
- John George Hedges, Timekeeper, Southampton Central, Southern Region, British Railways Board.
- Maurice Ernest Hewitt, Senior Technician, Ilford Installation Office, General Post Office.
- Beryl Mildred Hindley, Commandant, Merioneth 24 Detachment, British Red Cross Society.
- Lilian Florence Mary Hughes, Commandant, County of London Branch, British Red Cross Society.
- Cecil William Mitford Ireland, Chief Petty Officer Instructor, Guildford Sea Cadet Corps Unit.
- James Irvine, Journeyman Binder, William Collins Sons & Co. Ltd, Glasgow.
- Richard David Jenkins, Works Overseer Grade III, HM Stationery Office.
- Alexander Johnston, Carpenter, Clan Finlay, British & Commonwealth Shipping Co. Ltd.
- Francis James Johnston, Technical Works Grade II, South Scotland Conservancy, Forestry Commission.
- Arthur Fred Jones, Mains Foreman, Conway Valley District, Merseyside and North Wales Electricity Board.
- Emille Jones, Deputy Superintendent, Refreshment Department, House of Lords.
- Gwyn Jones, Carpenter and Maintenance Man, National Headquarters, British Red Cross Society.
- Idris Jones, Inspector, Holyhead, London Midland Region, British Railways Board.
- Alfred Jukes, School Staff Instructor, Harrow School Combined Cadet Force.
- Andrew Kennedy, Foreman, Haven Products Sheltered Workshop, Glasgow.
- James Kerr, Section Inspector, Union Canal, British Waterways Board.
- Phyllis Kitcheman, Chief Supervisor, Post Office Telephones, Huddersfield.
- Sister Winifred Laver, Voluntary Welfare Worker, Gateshead.
- William Laycock, Machine Shop Supervisor, David Brown.
- John Frederick Douglas Le Poidevin, Senior Shipkeeper, Ministry of Defence (Royal Navy).
- George Loch Lockey, Engineering Foreman, Durham District, West Area, North Eastern Electricity Board.
- Chief Observer John Lord, Chief Observer, Post 15/L4, Royal Observer Corps.
- Mary B. McBride, Warden of Kilbowie Hostel, Oban High School, Oban.
- Florence McDermott, Supervisor of Cleaners, Lancaster House, Ministry of Public Building and Works.
- Andrew Hain McDonald, Boatswain, MV Glenmoor, General Service Contracts.
- Thomas James McDowell, Sub-District Commandant, Ulster Special Constabulary.
- Charles McKinney, Foreman Electrician, Crossness Sewage Treatment Works, Greater London Council.
- Samuel Alexander McMullan, Senior Dental Surgery Assistant, Ministry of Defence (Royal Navy).
- Walter Arnold Maddison, District Foreman, Rutland County Council.
- Matthew Mallinson, Station Officer, Westmorland Fire Brigade.
- Wilfred Thomas Marshall, Production Superintendent, Elliot Lucas Ltd.
- William Henry Matthews, Works Technical Officer Grade III, Ministry of Technology.
- Thomas Blythe Mellon, Foreman Electrician, Caterpillar Tractor Company Ltd, Co. Durham.
- Winifred Beatrice Florence Miles, Honorary Collector, Street and Village Savings Groups, Martock.
- Edward Joseph Molloy, Signal Officer, Civil Defence Corps, London Borough of Hammersmith.
- Gertrude Elizabeth Montgomery, Assistant Supervisor, Telephone Exchange, Omagh, General Post Office.
- William Montgomery, Assistant Foreman Fitter, Engine Works Outside Erectors Department, Harland & Wolff.
- Raymond Frank Morgan, Repairer, Marine Colliery, East Wales Area, National Coal Board.
- William Roland Morgan, Warrant Officer, No. 2167 (Tredegar) Squadron, Air Training Corps.
- Ian Muir, Inspector, Liverpool and Bootle Constabulary.
- William George Munn, Foreman Carpenter, River Severn, British Waterways Board.
- William Thomas Newman, Assistant Superintendent, Head Post Office, Romford and Dagenham.
- James O'Connor, Technical Grade II M. & E. Ministry of Public Building and Works.
- William Ogilvie, Chargehand, Anniesland (Glasgow) Remploy Factory.
- Margaret Watson Orr, Inspector, Fife Constabulary.
- Eric Osborne, Head Herdsman, Roper and Son, Lenborough, Buckingham.
- Clifford Osburn, Carpenter, "Baltic Jet" General Service Contracts.
- George Robert Page, Skilled Craftsman, Research Group, United Kingdom Atomic Energy Authority.
- John Acton Park, Overseer, Head Post Office, Lancaster.
- Warwick Henry Parker, Prepayment Collector, South Eastern Gas Board.
- James Peacock, Supervisor of Telephone Operators, Ministry of Defence (Royal Navy).
- Samuel Ralph Stewart Peat, Inspector, Army Department Constabulary, Royal Military College of Science.
- Emma E. Potter, General Superintendent of Cleaners, Ministry of Housing and Local Government.
- Frederick Charles Prentice, Craftsman (Research and Development) Special Rocket Propulsion Establishment, Ministry of Technology.
- Thomas Eric Preston, Roll Turner, Sheffield Forge and Rolling Mills Co. Ltd.
- John James Ramshaw, Stoneman, Blackball Colliery, South Durham Area, National Coal Board.
- Francis Redman, Senior Scientific Assistant, Ministry of Defence (Royal Air Force).
- Thomas Leonard Richardson, Commissionaire, Monitoring Service, British Broadcasting Corporation.
- Charles Alfred Roberts, General Assistant Engineer, Bushbury Transmission District, Midlands Region, Central Electricity Generating Board.
- George William Routledge Robson, Foreman, Smith & Walton Ltd.
- David Rodgers. For services to first aid in Rotherham.
- Walter Charles Roper, River Inspector, Medway Conservancy Board.
- Maggie Brown Roxburgh, Street Savings Group Collector, Kirkpatrick-Durham, Kirkcudbrightshire.
- Harold Rutter, Driller, Machine Shop, J. & F. Pool Ltd.
- Douglas Clarence Salmon, Instructional Officer, Grade I, Ministry of Labour.
- Henry Watson Sanderson, Gliding Instructor, No. 645 Gliding School, Air Training Corps.
- Lise Karina Sanderson, Honorary Collector, Street Savings Groups, South Shields.
- Rose Margaret Sawyer, Supervisor, Catering Department, H.Q. British Railways Board.
- John Seaby, Head Security Guard, Office of the British Chargé d'Affairs, Peking.
- Godfrey Eric Seymour, Machine Shop Supervisor, British American Optical Co. Ltd, Kidwelly.
- James Norman Shepherd, Foreman Fitter, Central Heating Section, Clwyd, Denbigh & Ruthin Undertakings, Wales Gas Board.
- Herbert Wilfred Simons, Senior Model Maker, Ministry of Defence (Royal Air Force).
- Thomas Sinclair, Chief Officer Class I, HM Prison, Barlinnie, Scottish Home and Health Department.
- Robert Skellern, Senior Supplies Superintendent, General Post Office.
- Frederick Arthur John Slaughter, Station Officer (Auxiliary Fire Service), Essex Fire Brigade.
- Reginald Woodward Small, Instructional Officer, Grade III, Ministry of Labour.
- Matthew Spedding, Process Worker, Production Group, Windscale Works, United Kingdom Atomic Energy Authority.
- Marjorie Spencer, District Organiser, Kingston upon Thames, Women's Royal Voluntary Service.
- George Fordham Stacy, Area Traffic Inspector, Central Buses, London Transport Board.
- Sidney John Stringer, Assistant Inspector, Mount Pleasant Garage, General Post Office.
- Frederick Arthur Symons, Senior Technician, Post Office Radio Station, Dorchester, Dorset.
- Robert Copeland Taylor, Foreman Upholsterer, Ministry of Finance for Northern Ireland.
- Ronald Joseph Taylor, Assistant Divisional Officer, Isle of Wight Fire Brigade.
- Kathleen Thomas, Foster parent, Malvern.
- Rowland Charles Thomas, Berthingman (Special), Port Talbot, British Transport Docks Board.
- William Robert Herriot Thomson, City Officer, Edinburgh Corporation.
- Maurice Todd, Sample Passer, Appleby-Frodingham Steel Company.
- George Tribbeck, Liner Shop Superintendent, Wellworthy Ltd, Weymouth Works.
- Cyril Trott, Foreman of Stores, No. 11 Maintenance Unit, Ministry of Defence (Royal Air Force).
- John Alfred Turner, Station Officer, HM Coastguard, St. Just, Cornwall.
- Arthur George Turnpenny, Lead Hand Universal Grinder, Machine Shop, Hawker Siddeley Dynamics Ltd.
- Henry Ernest Wall, Receiver Technician, British Broadcasting Corporation.
- Herbert James Wall, Road Safety Officer, Oxford.
- George Ward, Instructor, Preliminary Training Centre, Treeton, South Yorkshire Area, National Coal Board.
- Ernest Johannes Weinberg, Engine Room Store Keeper, Esso Pembrokeshire, Esso Petroleum Co. Ltd.
- Beatrice Evelyn Mary Welch, Chief Signals Supervisor, British Overseas Airways Corporation.
- Arthur Stanley White, Lately Driver Attendant, London Ambulance Service.
- Leslie Jack Wighton, Carpenter, Canberra, P. & O. Steam Navigation Co.
- William Wilson, Power Loader Operator, Frances Colliery, Scottish North Area National Coal Board.
- Winifred Margaret Mary Wood, Commandant 1OM/2 Detachment, Isle of Man Central Council Branch, British Red Cross Society.
- Frederick Walter Yalden, Area Road Foreman, South East Division, Buckinghamshire County Council.

State of New South Wales

- Margaret Theadora Allan. For services to the community.
- Leonard Ernest Booth. Member, Parliamentary Hansard Staff.
- Eva Mavis Franks. For services to the community.
- William Brennan Frost. Senior Works Supervisor, Water Supply and Storage Branch, Department of Public Works.
- Alice Margaret Herd. For services to the community.
- Amy Gwendoline MacGregor. For services to the community.
- Aubrey Felix Thomas. For services to music.

State of Queensland

- Thomas Edward Connelly. Head Porter, Canberra Hotel.

State of Western Australia

- Elsie Alice Clear. For welfare services particularly in the interests of disabled ex-servicemen.
- Myrtle Judges. For welfare services to the community, particularly in the interests of new settlers.
- Annie Elizabeth Power. For services lo the community, particularly to the sick and aged in Western Australia.
- Florence Lillian Turner. For services to the Girl Guide movement in Boulder.

Overseas Territories

- Laura Young, Cook, Government House, Bahamas.
- Stanley Nibbs, Handicraft Teacher, Secondary School, British Virgin Islands.
- Iris O'Neil, District Nurse, Virgin Gorda, British Virgin Islands.
- Harry Changty-Sing, Engineroom Foreman, Electricity Department, Seychelles.

=== Queen's Police Medals (QPM) ===
England and Wales

- Alan Ure Reith Scroggie, OBE, Her Majesty's Inspector of Constabulary.
- John Alexander Willison, OBE, Chief Constable, West Mercia Constabulary.
- William Farley, MC, Chief Constable, Gwent Constabulary.
- John Ronald Jones, Chief Constable, Carmarthenshire and Cardiganshire Constabulary.
- Norman Watson, DFC, Assistant Chief Constable, Liverpool and Bootle Constabulary.
- Felix Sayer, Assistant Chief Constable, Lincolnshire Constabulary.
- John Glaister Morrison, Assistant Chief Constable, Birmingham City Police, Deputy Commandant, The Police College.
- Frederick Richards, Chief Superintendent and Acting Chief Constable, Salford City Police.
- John Mannings, Chief Superintendent, Metropolitan Police.
- Ivor Herbert Jones, Chief Superintendent, Metropolitan Police.
- Leonard Charles Dolby, Superintendent and Acting Chief Constable, Reading Borough Police.
- Joseph Idwal Rees, Superintendent, Metropolitan Police.
- George Frederick Reid, Superintendent, Metropolitan Police.
- Mary Elizabeth Wright, Woman Superintendent, Staffordshire Constabulary.

Scotland

- David Williamson, Chief Constable, Renfrew and Bute Constabulary.
- John Russell, Assistant Chief Constable, Lothians and Peebles Constabulary.

Northern Ireland

- John Robert Williamson, Head Constable, Royal Ulster Constabulary.

State of Queensland

- Hugh Low, Chief Inspector, Queensland Police Force.
- John Edward Osborn, Inspector, Queensland Police Force.
- Louis Joseph Platz, Inspector, Queensland Police Force.
- Alec Day, Inspector, Queensland Police Force.
- Daniel Vincent Farrell, lately Inspector, Queensland Police Force.

State of South Australia

- Howard Clair Bottroff, Inspector, South Australia Police Force.
- John Ernest White, Inspector, South Australia Police Force.
- John Bryan Giles, Inspector, South Australia Police Force.

Nigeria

- Douglas William Price, Chief Superintendent, Nigeria Police.

Overseas Territories

- Brian Francis Patrick Slevin, Acting Senior Assistant Commissioner of Police, Hong Kong.
- Peter James Clough, Assistant Commissioner of Police, Hong Kong.
- John Bedvvell Lees, Assistant Commissioner of Police, Hong Kong.
- Eugene Kevin Ignatius O'Reilly, Assistant Commissioner of Police, Hong Kong.
- John Douglas Clague, CBE, MC, TD, JP, Commandant, Hong Kong Auxiliary Police.
- Samuel Harvey Brookes, Chief of Police, Saint Lucia.
- James McCabe, Senior Superintendent of Police, Swaziland.

=== Queen's Fire Services Medals (QFSM) ===
England and Wales

- George Edward Bertram Brunner, Chief Fire Officer, Portsmouth Fire Brigade.
- Thomas Mervyn Lloyd, Command Fire Adviser, Army Southern Command, United Kingdom.
- Robert Whitlow Bagot, Divisional Officer, Grade I, London Fire Brigade.
- William Middleton, Chief Fire Officer, Birkenhead Fire Brigade.
- Herbert James William Stretten, Divisional Officer, Grade III, Berkshire and Reading Fire Brigade.

State of Victoria

- John Paterson, Chief Officer, Metropolitan Fire Brigade, Melbourne.

=== Colonial Police Medals (CPM) ===
Overseas Territories

- Shummoogum Acheemootoo, Inspector, Mauritius Police Force.
- Eric Blackburn, Superintendent, Hong Kong Police Force.
- Kenneth William Catton, Assistant Superintendent, Hong Kong Auxiliary Police Force.
- Thomas McDonald Stewart Chalmers, Superintendent, Hong Kong Police Force.
- Chau Ping-ming, Senior Inspector, Hong Kong Auxiliary Police Force.
- Chow Kim-hung, Senior Inspector, Hong Kong Auxiliary Police Force.
- Leonardo Victor Da Roza, Senior Inspector, Hong Kong Auxiliary Police Force.
- Leon Francis, Station Sergeant, Royal Saint Lucia Police Force.
- Peter Fitzroy Godber, Senior Superintendent, Hong Kong Police Force.
- Frans Jan Matthias Goldberg, Assistant Superintendent, Hong Kong Auxiliary Police Force.
- James Christopher Patrick Hanlon, Inspector, Bermuda Police Force.
- George Hindhaugh, Assistant Superintendent, British Solomon Islands Police Force.
- Ho Shiu-mmg, Divisional Officer, Auxiliary Fire Service, Hong Kong.
- William Furlonger Hunt, Senior Inspector, Hong Kong Auxiliary Police Force.
- Kwok Kwing-lun, Fire Officer Class II, Fire Services, Hong Kong.
- Lee Chung-tin, Sergeant, Hong Kong Police Force.
- Li Mut-wah, Senior Inspector, Hong Kong Police Force.
- Augustine Lim Kai-mo, Superintendent, Hong Kong Police Force.
- Henry Lin Hsing-chih, Superintendent, Hong Kong Police Force.
- Alistair Bain McNutt, Superintendent, Hong Kong Police Force.
- Ahmed Phans Mohideen, Assistant Superintendent, Hong Kong Auxiliary Police Force.
- Mok Po, Principal Fireman, Fire Services, Hong Kong.
- Edward Roy Moss, Superintendent, Hong Kong Police Force.
- Robert Howard Moss, Senior Fire Officer Class I, Fire Services, Hong Kong.
- Richard Edgar Quine, Superintendent, Hong Kong Police Force.
- Raymond Francis Smith, Senior Superintendent, Hong Kong Police Force.
- Basdeho Tapesar, Superintendent, Mauritius Police Force.
- Arthur John Taylor, Superintendent, Gibraltar Police Force.
- Oliver Salisbury Trott, Superintendent, Bermuda Police Force.
- Manikon Vuddamallay, Inspector, Mauritius Police Force.
- Wong Che-choy, Senior Inspector, Hong Kong Auxiliary Police Force.
- Yuen Wai-yin, Fire Officer Class I, Fire Services, Hong Kong.

=== Royal Red Crosses (RRC) ===
Army

- Colonel (Acting) Joan Marion Orford (317957), Queen Alexandra's Royal Army Nursing Corps.
- Colonel Betsy Mackie Robertson, ARRC (215306), Queen Alexandra's Royal Army Nursing Corps.

==== Associates of the Royal Red Cross (ARRC) ====
Royal Navy

- Ruth Carter, Superintending Sister/Matron, Queen Alexandra's Royal Naval Nursing Service.
- Joan Ryan, Matron, Queen Alexandra's Royal Naval Nursing Service (now Retired).

Army

- Major Yvonne Jean Marion Maryse Dunning (441268), Queen Alexandra's Royal Army Nursing Corps.
- Lieutenant-Colonel Edith Lees, TD (316420), Queen Alexandra's Royal Army Nursing Corps, Territorial and Army Volunteer Reserve.

Royal Air Force

- Squadron Officer Anne Joan Coghlan (406531), Princess Mary's Royal Air Force Nursing Service.
- Squadron Officer Joan Doreen Smedley (407385), Princess Mary's Royal Air Force Nursing Service.

=== Air Force Crosses (AFC) ===
Army

- Major Peter Raymond Ralph (409419), Royal Corps of Transport.

Royal Air Force

- Squadron Leader Stuart Cameron (505212).
- Squadron Leader Gordon James Clark (163458).
- Squadron Leader Peter William Gee, MBE (700746).
- Squadron Leader John Bryan Mitchell (4039392).
- Squadron Leader Gardiner Melvin Turner (607465).
- Flight Lieutenant Arthur Edwin Bance (1604798).
- Flight Lieutenant John Frederick Farley (4173398) (Retired).
- Flight Lieutenant David Hurley (2502532).
- Flight Lieutenant Richard Maclachlan (154753).
- Flight Lieutenant Henry John Disney Prince (4139683).
- Flight Lieutenant Alan Turley (4082627).
- Master Pilot Frank Bright (K1425685).
- Master Navigator Kenneth William Burlton (N1802625).

==== Bar to Air Force Cross ====
- Flight Lieutenant Edward Vine, AFC (572437). For services with the British Joint Services Training Team, Zambia.

=== Queen's Commendations for Valuable Service in the Air ===
Royal Air Force

- Squadron Leader Peter Painter Crampton (654325).
- Squadron Leader John David Lloyd (3132225).
- Squadron Leader Jenkin Alun Morgan (2492961).
- Squadron Leader Raymond Ernest Paul, AFC (123447).
- Squadron Leader Anthony Gerald Skingsley (2608210).
- Squadron Leader Derek Anthony Taylor (3031315).
- Squadron Leader John Edward Vickery (2620756).
- Squadron Leader Nigel John Russell Walpole (3511028).
- Squadron Leader Michael Hugh Ware (147134).
- Flight Lieutenant Kenneth John Allen (56600).
- Flight Lieutenant Frederick Archbold (178726).
- Flight Lieutenant John David Douglas-Boyd (4093285).
- Flight Lieutenant Timothy Charles Elworthy (607863).
- Flight Lieutenant Kenvyn Jenkins, AFC (196513).
- Flight Lieutenant William Leonard Kemish (1805561).
- Flight Lieutenant Bernard Austin Lewis (584601).
- Flight Lieutenant William Joseph McCausland, AFM (1458998) (Retired).
- Flight Lieutenant Eric Markwell (163834).
- Flight Lieutenant Gerard Patrick O'Donovan (2552374).
- Flight Lieutenant William Frederick John Pike (3119456).
- Flight Lieutenant Linton Scott (1554170).
- Flight Lieutenant Michael John Webb (3512095).
- Flight Lieutenant Stanley Cyril Williams (1319015).
- Flight Lieutenant Ronald Arthur Wood (576842).
- Master Pilot Laurence Eric Powell, AFM (Q1672022). For services with the British Joint Services Training Team, Zambia.
- Master Pilot Donald William Sissins (F0582443).
- Master Signaller Jack William Bickford (D3031561).

United Kingdom

- George Peter Aird, Chief Military Test Pilot, Hawker Siddeley Aviation Ltd, Hatfield, Hertfordshire.
- William Black Cairns, Assistant Chief Test Pilot, V.C.10 Flight, British Aircraft Corporation (Operating) Ltd, Weybridge Division, Surrey.
- Frederick Douglas Everest, Senior Engineer Officer, Instructor on V.C.10 Flight, British Overseas Airways Corporation.
- James Pollitt, Deputy Chief Test Pilot, Bristol Siddeley Engines Ltd, Filton, Bristol.
- Captain James Bryan Shaw, Training Manager, Service Contracts, British United Airways.

== Australia ==
=== Knights Bachelor ===
- Jack Evelyn Cassidy, of Rose Bay, New South Wales. For services in law and public activities.
- James Ralph Darling, CMG, OBE, Chairman, Australian Broadcasting Commission.
- Thomas Moore Greenaway, MB, ChM, of Killara, New South Wales. For services to medicine.
- The Honourable Rutherford Campbell Guthrie, CMG, of Linton, Victoria. For services to primary industry and the community.
- Robert Helpmann, CBE. For distinguished contribution to ballet as choreographer and producer.
- Charles Gullan McGrath, OBE, of Brighton, Victoria. For services to Industry and Government.
- John Wallace Overall, CBE, MC, Commissioner, National Capital Development Commission.
- His Excellency Mr. John Keith Waller, CBE, Her Majesty's Australian Ambassador Extraordinary and Plenipotentiary to the United States of America.
- Norman Smith Young, of Erindale, South Australia. For services to Government and the community.

=== Order of the Bath ===
==== Companions of the Order of the Bath (CB) ====
Military Division

- Major-General James William Harrison, CBE (367), Australian Staff Corps.

=== Order of Saint Michael and Saint George ===
==== Companions of the Order of St Michael and St George (CMG) ====
- Wesley Armstrong Ince, of Malvern, Victoria. Vice President, Australian-American Association.
- Reginald Colin Townley, of New Town, Tasmania. For political and public services.
- The Very Reverend Alan Cameron Watson, Minister, Toorak Presbyterian Church. For services to religion and the community.

=== Order of the British Empire ===
==== Knights Commander of the Order of the British Empire (KBE) ====
Civil Division

- Gordon Colvin Lindesay Clark, CMG, MC, of Malvern, Victoria. For services to the mining industry.
- Senator the Honourable Kenneth James Morris, CMG, of Cooktown, Queensland. For services to Parliament and the community.

==== Commanders of the Order of the British Empire (CBE) ====
Military Division

Australian Military Forces

- Brigadier Edgar Logan (3167), Australian Staff Corps.
- Brigadier Thomas Fergus Buchanan MacAdie, DSO (386) Australian Staff Corps.

Royal Australian Air Force

- Air Commodore Jack Bowling, AFC.

Civil Division

- His Excellency Mr. Frederick Joseph Blakeney, Her Majesty's Australian Ambassador Extraordinary and Plenipotentiary to the Federal Republic of Germany.
- The Honourable Cyril Chambers, of Hawthorn, South Australia. For services to Parliament, to migration and the community.
- The Honourable James Allan Guy, of Launceston, Tasmania. For services to Parliament and the community.
- George Alfred Lloyd, of St. Ives, New South Wales. For services to the community.
- Maurice Walter O'Donnell, OBE, Deputy Secretary, Department of the Treasury.
- Una Beatrice Porter, OBE, MB, BS, of Surrey Hills, Victoria. World President, Young Women's Christian Association.
- Norman Napoleon Robertson, of Toorak, Victoria. For services to industry and export.
- George Henry Warwick Smith, OBE, Secretary, Department of Territories.
- Winton George Turnbull, of Boort, Victoria. For political and public services.
- Gavin Walkley, of North Adelaide, South Australia. For services to architecture and Government.

==== Officers of the Order of the British Empire (OBE) ====
Military Division

Royal Australian Navy

- Acting Captain Alister William Savage.

Australian Military Forces

- Colonel William Albert Bunting (337661), Australian Staff Corps.
- Lieutenant-Colonel Francis Stuart Banner Peach (2143), Australian Staff Corps.
- Lieutenant-Colonel Raymond John Stanley, ED (410632), Royal Australian Armoured Corps.

Royal Australian Air Force

- Group Captain George Foster De La Rue.
- Wing Commander Cyril William Fitton (033030).

Civil Division

- Jean Denton, of Unley Park, South Australia. For services to pre-school education.
- Leonard Henry Ernest Dorman, of North Balwyn, Victoria. General Manager, Australian Wheat Board.
- Arthur Noel Finlay, MC, of Greenwich, New South Wales. Assistant General Manager (General), Australian Broadcasting Commission.
- Kathleen Gorham (Mrs. B. Marrows), of Melbourne, Victoria. For services to ballet.
- Duncan Percy Hooper, of Mosmon, New South Wales. For services to journalism.
- Robert Burns Hutchison, Assistant Crown Solicitor, Attorney-General's Department.
- William Mathers Jack, of Crows Nest, New South Wales. For services to Parliament and to the community.
- Gertrude Langer, President, Queensland Division, Arts Council of Australia.
- Hubert Anton Lenne, of Shepparton, Victoria. For services to the dairying industry.
- Charles Herbert Locke, of Point Piper, New South Wales. Chairman of the Outward Bound Memorial Foundation. For services to commerce and the community.
- Keith David Averill Medbury, Director of War Service Homes, Department of Housing.
- Reginald Rupert Newlands, of Ashburton, Victoria. President of the Association of Professional Engineers, Australia.
- Ray Herbert Hastings Nobbs, District Coroner, Norfolk Island.
- Frederick John Spellacy, of Leura, New South Wales. For services to the road transport industry.
- Herbert Hughson Stubbs, of Port Moresby. For charity and community services.
- Major Philip Venables Vernon, of Lindfield, New South Wales. For services to the community and as a military historian.
- Thomas Bruce Campbell Walker, of Murringo, New South Wales. President, Australian Wool Growers' and Graziers' Council.
- Captain Alan Wharton, of Pymble, New South Wales. For services to civil aviation.
- Howard Arthur Wills, of North Balwyn, Victoria. Chief Scientist, Department of Supply.
- Richard Struth Wilson, of Gladstone, Queensland. For services to government and rural industry.

==== Members of the Order of the British Empire (MBE) ====
Military Division

Royal Australian Navy

- Lieutenant Commander James Stewart Dickson.
- Surgeon Lieutenant Samuel Sakker, MB, BS.

Australian Military Forces

- Major Edward Underwood Anderson (5303), Royal Australian Survey Corps.
- 2139600 Warrant Officer Class II Edward John Ballard, Royal Australian Armoured Corps.
- Captain (temporary) Frederick James Bolitho (31377), Royal Australian Infantry Corps.
- 32358 Warrant Officer Class II Walter Robert Everett, Royal Australian Infantry Corps.
- 358661 Warrant Officer Class II Robert Clive Millett, Royal Australian Artillery.
- Lieutenant-Colonel (honorary) Reginald Arthur Newman (4905014), Royal Australian Army Educational Corps.
- 5248 Warrant Officer Class I William John Storey, Royal Australian Artillery.

Royal Australian Air Force

- Squadron Leader Reginald Heathcote (022050).
- Warrant Officer William Bernard Smith (A5572).
- Warrant Officer Leonard Uren (A2959).

Civil Division

- Hazel Estelle de Berg, of Bellevue Hill, New South Wales. For services in assembling a valuable collection of archival material.
- Douglas Alan Bouch, Assistant Director (Construction), Department of Works, South Australia.
- William Thomas Brown, of Kieta, Bougainville. District Officer, Department of District Administration.
- Frances Lillian Cameron, of Coonabarabran, New South Wales. For services to nursing.
- Ernest Cavanagh, of Ginninderra, Australian Capital Territory. Chairman, Bush Fire Council.
- Patricia Downes Chomley, of Armidale, Victoria. For services to the administration of nursing.
- Edward William Clayfield, of Penola, South Australia. For community services.
- Ernest Walter Corless, of East Kew, Victoria. Engineer, Class 4, Central Staff, Postmaster-General's Department.
- James Xavier Coutts, of Leichhardt, New South Wales. For services to youth.
- Sister Mary Dorothea, of Ashfield, New South Wales, Principal of Our Lady of the Snow Chalet.
- Gerald Vincent Francis Doyle, MB, BS, formerly Medical Officer, Cocos (Keeling) Islands.
- Maxwell Hardwick Dunstone, Engineer, Class 3, Engineering Division, Postmaster-General's Department, Tasmania.
- Beryl Gwendolyn Ferry, of Dee Why, New South Wales. For public services.
- Albert Finney, of Maitland, New South Wales. For services to ex-servicemen.
- John James Follan, Engineer, Class 5, and Principal Naval Architect, Department of the Navy.
- Jean Hazel Garside, of Pennant Hills, New South Wales. For services to handicapped persons in the community.
- Venerable Archdeacon Clive Andrew Goodwin, of Sydney, New South Wales. For services to the aged.
- Eileen Heath, Welfare Officer, Welfare Branch, Northern Territory Administration, Department of Territories.
- The Reverend William John Johnson, of Glenferrie, Victoria. For services to the community.
- Arthur Kenneth Jones. For services in the manufacture of prosthetic equipment for residents in the Territory of Papua and New Guinea.
- The Reverend Percy Jones, of Carlton, Victoria. For services to religion and music.
- Liwa Kolau, of Madang. President of Ambenob Council.
- The Reverend Lazarus Lami Lami, of Croker Island, Northern Territory. For services to the community.
- James Long, JP, of Dagun, Queensland. For services to the dairying industry.
- James Clayton Maccormick, Architect, Department of Works, Canberra.
- Linda Carol McGill, of Bondi, New South Wales. For her long distance swimming achievements.
- Arthur Maurice McMenamin, of Mentone, Victoria. Finance Officer, Central Staff, Department of Civil Aviation.
- Philip Henry O'Keefe of Kew, Victoria. Member of the Transport Branch, Department of Shipping and Transport.
- George Polites, of Cheltenham, Victoria. For services to industrial relations.
- Douglas John Rae, MB, BS, Director of Medical Services, Department of Repatriation, Hobart.
- Alderman Keith Alfred Roy Smith, ED, JP, of Burwood, New South Wales. For services to the community.
- Desmond Francis John Stratton, former Mayor of Cootamundra. For services to the community.
- Helen Agnes Todd, of South Yarra, Victoria. For services to physiotherapy.
- Oliver Rutherford Turner, of Glenelg, South Australia. For services to the community.
- Councillor Robert Mark Vaughan, President, Gosford Shire Council.
- Richard Langloh Want, Director, Psychology Department of Air, Canberra.
- Andrew Wood, Administrative Assistant, Australian Forestry School, Department of Forestry, Australian National University, Canberra.
- Percy Wood, of Arncliffe, New South Wales. For services to the community.
- Leonora Wray, of Woollahra, New South Wales. For services to women's golf.

=== Companions of the Imperial Service Order (ISO) ===
- Lewis Henry William Gibson, of Mount Waverley, Victoria. Chief Reporter, Commonwealth Reporting Branch, Attorney-General's Department.
- Gordon James Laycock, of Murrumbeetia, Victoria. Controller of Lighthouse Services, Department of Shipping and Transport.
- James William Plank, Regional Director, Perth. Department of Trade and Industry.

=== British Empire Medals (BEM) ===
Military Division

Royal Australian Navy

- Chief Airman Aircraft handler George Raymond Blondel, R.40729.
- Sergeant 1st Class Frederick William Burgoyne, R. 19722.
- Chief Petty Officer Alisi Kamonabi, O.80001.

Australian Military Forces

- 1450 Warrant Officer Class II (temporary) Keith David Doig, Royal Australian Engineers.
- 35472 Staff Sergeant Edward Bernard Hardiman, Royal Australian Signal Corps.
- 849 Warrant Officer Class II (temporary) Manli Rosi, Royal Australian Infantry Corps.
- 3123005 Sergeant Jack Donald Phillips, Royal Australian Armoured Corps.
- 22771 Staff Sergeant Thomas George Pillar, Royal Australian Engineers.
- 31194 Sergeant (temporary) Dennis Richard Sawyer, Royal Australian Infantry Corps.

Royal Australian Air Force

- A12248 Flight Sergeant (Acting Warrant Officer) Reginald Bennett.
- A51273 Flight Sergeant Edward George Killigrew Rosling.
- W55850 Corporal Patricia Molly Markussen, Women's Royal Australian Air Force.

Civil Division

- James Phillip Adam, Principal Attendant, House of Representatives.
- Eunice Mercy St. Clair Aram, Officer-in-Charge, Melbourne City Females Office, Department of Labour and National Service.
- Ray Aylett, Lineman, Grade 2, Postmaster-General's Department, South Australia.
- Mary Josephine Baker, Typist-in-Charge, Department of Immigration, Melbourne.
- Arthur Joseph Bearup. Formerly Specialist Scientific Officer, Grade 3, Department of Health, New South Wales.
- Ivy Edna Faunce, Charity worker of Naremburn, New South Wales.
- Reginald Arthur Ford, Senior Technical Officer, Topographic Survey Section, Department of National Development.
- Zelma Alberta Frances Giles. Formerly Steno-Secretary, Grade 1, Repatriation Department, New South Wales.
- Douglas Chssold Grant, Foreman Sailmaker, Department of the Navy, Sydney.
- George Henry Grimme, Senior Technical Officer, Grade 1, Department of Civil Aviation, Victoria-Tasmania Region.
- Percival James Sandford Haigh, Meat Inspector-in-Charge, Department of Primary Industry, Sydney.
- Donald Peter Hall, Line Foreman Grade 1, Engineering Division Postmaster-General's Department, Tasmania.
- Julie Hatfield, Supervisor and Manageress, Senior Citizens' Club, Five Dock, New South Wales.
- Elsie Horsfall, Typist-in-Charge, Grade 2, Establishment and Finance Section, Department of Education and Science, North Sydney.
- William Charles Hutson, Line Inspector, Postmaster-General's Department, South Australia.
- Aimee Jones, Secretary, Artists' Booking Clerk and General Administrative Assistant to the Supervisor of Drama, A.B.C., Melbourne.
- Mary Kekedo, Senior Assistant, Kokoda Primary "T" School.
- John Arthur McMahon, Acting Security Officer, Department of Supply, Sydney.
- Rose McSweeney, Supervisor, Public Service Board, Sydney.
- Ivy Mullany. Formerly Secretary, Australian Red Cross Society, Campbelltown Branch.
- Edward Murray. Formerly Pumping Station Engineer, Department of Works, Australian Capital Territory.
- William O'Brien, Officer-in-Charge, Plan Printing Section, Department of the Interior.
- Joseph Henry Riddle, Library Assistant, Grade 4, Parliamentary Library.
- William Robert Stanley Roberson, Leighton, Western Australia. For service in Merchant Shipping.
- Phillip Roberts, Technical Assistant, Grade 1, Department of Health, Darwin.
- George Eaton Shera, Technical Officer, Grade 1, Department of Health.
- Cyril Joseph Small, Works Supervisor, Territory of Papua and New Guinea.
- Narelle Elaine Smith, Steno-Secretary, Grade 2, Department of the Navy.
- Victor Arthur Sward, Acting Lineman, Grade 2, Postmaster-General's Department, Tasmania.
- Jack Donald Uffindell, Supervising Technician, Engineering Division, Postmaster-General's Department, South Australia.
- Herman Rudolf Hans Voss, Senior Drafting Officer and Chief Draftsman, National Capital Development Commission.
- Margaret Josephine Gladys Walsh, Typist-in-Charge, Department of Air.

=== Queen's Police Medal (QPM) ===
- Robert James Larkin, Deputy Commissioner, Papua and New Guinea Police Force.

=== Royal Red Cross (RRC) ===
==== Associate of the Royal Red Cross (ARRC) ====
- Acting Wing Officer Betty Bristow Docker (N39572), Royal Australian Air Force Nursing Service.

=== Air Force Cross (AFC) ===
- Squadron Leader Neville Thomas Raffin (013642).

==== Bar to Air Force Cross ====
- Wing Commander Thomas Jewitt Tudberry Meldrum, AFC (012631).

=== Queen's Commendations for Valuable Service in the Air ===
Royal Australian Air Force

- Flight Lieutenant Peter Duncan Blockey (505012), Royal Air Force.
- Flight Lieutenant Maxwell Leon Norsworthy (043152).

Australian Military Forces

- Captain Robert Frederick Smith (16143), Royal Australian Army Service Corps.

== Sierra Leone ==
=== Order of the British Empire ===
==== Commanders of the Order of the British Empire (CBE) ====
Civil Division

- Adesanya Kwamina Hyde, DFC, Secretary-General, National Reformation Council Secretariat.
- Leslie William Leigh, MVO, OBE, Commissioner of Police and Deputy Chairman, National Reformation Council.

==== Officers of the Order of the British Empire (OBE) ====
Civil Division

- Elkanah Laurence Coker, Deputy Financial Secretary, Department of Finance.
- David Ekundayo Boye-Johnson, Chief Medical Officer.
- Alpha Mahmoud Kamara, Assistant Commissioner of Police, and Member of the National Reformation Council.

==== Members of the Order of the British Empire (MBE) ====
Civil Division

- Thomas Ansumana Conteh, Superintendent of Police.
- Michael Alexander Olayemi Findlay, Senior Assistant Secretary, Department of Education.
- Stephen William Simbo. For services to education, as teacher in Department of Education.
- Paramount Chief Edward Yoki II, JP, Niawa Lenga Chiefdom, Southern Province.

== Jamaica ==
=== Knight Bachelor ===
- His Excellency Mr. Egerton Rudolph Richardson, CMG. Ambassador for Jamaica in Washington.

=== Order of the British Empire ===
==== Commander of the Order of the British Empire (CBE) ====
Civil Division

- Kenneth Hogarth Ivan Levy. For public services.

==== Officers of the Order of the British Empire (OBE) ====
Civil Division

- Felix Malcolm Fox. Chairman, Jamaica Industrial Development Corporation.
- Harold Milford Johnston, MB, ChB. Ed. For public services, particularly in the field of medicine.
- Aston Wesley Powell. For public services, particularly in the field of education.

==== Members of the Order of the British Empire (MBE) ====
Civil Division

- Cecil Boswell Facey. For public and philanthropic services.
- William Samuel Howard. Senior Superintendent, Jamaica Constabulary Force.
- Edith Agatha Nelson. General Secretary, Bustamante Industrial Trade Union.

=== British Empire Medals (BEM) ===
Military Division

- Colour Sergeant Winston Ashley Scott, Jamaica Defence Force.
- Warrant Officer Class II Noel Langley Walcott, Jamaica Infantry Volunteers.

=== Queen's Police Medal (QPM) ===
- Orville Fitzmorris Bernard, Assistant Commissioner, Jamaica Constabulary Force.

== Gambia ==
=== Order of the British Empire ===
==== Commander of the Order of the British Empire (CBE) ====
Civil Division

- David Athelstane Percival, Economic Adviser.

==== Members of the Order of the British Empire (MBE) ====
Civil Division

- Francis Adekunle Jeremiah Savage, Deputy Secretary to the Cabinet and Clerk of the House of Representatives.
- Julia Salome Theodora Williams. For services to the Nursing Profession.

=== British Empire Medals (BEM) ===
Civil Division

- William Francis Owens, Chief Telegraph Operator.
- Kebba Cherno Sallah, Executive Officer, Agricultural Department.

== Guyana ==
=== Queen's Police Medal (QPM) ===
- Felix Wilton Austin, Commissioner, Guyana Police Force.

== Barbados ==
=== Order of the British Empire ===
==== Commander of the Order of the British Empire (CBE) ====
Civil Division

- Oshley Roy Marshall, JP. For outstanding services in the legal field and as Constitutional Adviser to Barbados.

==== Officers of the Order of the British Empire (OBE) ====
Civil Division

- Carlyle Archibald Burton, Permanent Secretary, Office of the Premier, Ministry of Education and Ministry of Health.
- Herbert Lisle Thomas, Deputy Clerk, House of Assembly.

==== Members of the Order of the British Empire (MBE) ====
Civil Division

- Harold Gittens Brewster, First Secretary, Office of the High Commissioner for Barbados, London.
- Colin St. Clair Daniel, Chief Clerk, Registration Office.

=== British Empire Medals (BEM) ===
Military Division

- Sergeant Irvine Darnley Hinkson, The Barbados Regiment.

Civil Division

- Delbert Edgar Allamby, Messenger, Treasurer's Department, City of Bridgetown.
- Egbert Bishop, Officer (First Class), Her Majesty's Prisons.
