= List of defunct law enforcement agencies in the United Kingdom =

Due to various acts of Parliament the numbers of law enforcement agencies in the United Kingdom has varied drastically since the Metropolitan Police Act 1829 set up the first modern police force in London.

There are currently over 60 law enforcement agencies operating in the United Kingdom. See List of law enforcement agencies in the United Kingdom, Crown Dependencies and British Overseas Territories for these.

For former (non-police) law enforcement agencies, see Category:Defunct law enforcement agencies of the United Kingdom. For defunct police forces, see Category:Defunct police forces of the United Kingdom

== England and Wales police forces ==
=== Abolished before 1889 ===
The County Police Act 1840 allowed for borough police forces to voluntarily amalgamate with county constabularies.

- Abingdon Borough Police, to Berkshire
- Andover Borough Police (1846, to Hampshire)
- Banbury Borough Police, to Oxfordshire
- Bodmin Borough Police (1865, to Cornwall)
- Bradninch Borough Police (1865, to Devon)
- Chipping Norton Borough Police, to Oxfordshire
- Henley Borough Police, to Oxfordshire
- Honiton Borough Police; (to Devon County)
- Launceston Borough Police (1883, to Cornwall)
- Liskeard Borough Police (1877, to Cornwall)
- Lymington Borough Police (1852, to Hampshire)
- Monmouth Borough Police (1881, to Monmouthshire)
- Newbury Borough Police (1875, to Berkshire)
- Okehampton Borough Police (1860, to Devon)
- Romsey Borough Police (1865, to Hampshire)
- South Molton Borough Police (1877, to Devon)
- Tavistock Borough Police (1856, to Devon)
- Thames River Police, absorbed into the London Metropolitan Police in 1839
- Torrington Borough Police (1870, then again from 1878 to 1886, to Devon)
- Torquay Borough Police (1870, to Devon)
- Totnes Borough Police (1884, to Devon)
- Wallingford Borough Police, to Berkshire
- Wantage Borough Police, to Berkshire
- Warwick Borough Police (1875, to Warwickshire)
- Wolborough Borough Police (1859, to Devon)

=== Abolished under the Local Government Act 1888 ===
The Local Government Act 1888, which came into force in 1889 passed control of county constabularies to standing joint committees of county councillors and magistrates, and merged smaller borough police forces (where the town had a population of less than 10,000) with the county police.

- Basingstoke Borough Police (1889, to Hampshire)
- Bideford Borough Police (1889, to Devon)
- Buckingham Borough Police (1889 to Buckinghamshire)
- Deal Borough Police (1889, to Kent)
- Falmouth Borough Police (1889, to Cornwall)
- Faversham Borough Police (1889, to Kent)
- Helston Borough Police (1889, to Cornwall)
- Hertford Borough Police (1889, to Hertfordshire)
- Hythe Borough Police (1889, to Kent)
- Maidenhead Borough Police (1889, to Berkshire)
- Newport Borough Police (1890, to Isle of Wight)
- Penryn Borough Police (1889, to Cornwall)
- Sandwich Borough Police (1889, to Kent)
- Stratford-upon-Avon Borough Police (1889, to Warwickshire)
- St Ives Borough Police (1889, to Cornwall)
- Tenterden Borough Police (1889, to Kent)

=== Abolished 1890–1942 ===
- Barnstaple Borough Police (1921, to Devon)
- Banbury Borough Police (1925, to Oxfordshire)
- Berwick upon Tweed Borough Police (1921, to Northumberland)
- Bridgwater Borough Police (1940, to Somerset Constabulary)
- Devonport Borough Police (1914, to Plymouth)
- Hanley Borough Police (1910, to Stoke-on-Trent Borough Police)
- Ryde Borough Police (1922, to Isle of Wight)
- Truro City Police (1921, to Cornwall. Prior to 1877 the force was called Truro Borough Police)
- Weymouth Borough Police (1921, to Dorset Constabulary)

=== Abolished under the Defence (Amalgamation of Police Forces) Regulations 1942 ===
The Defence (Amalgamation of Police Forces) Regulations 1942 (SR&O 1942/1443) were emergency wartime regulations made under the Emergency Powers (Defence) Act 1939.

NB – Some were re-constituted after the war but then abolished in 1946.

- Dover Borough Police (1943, to Kent)
- Folkestone Borough Police (1943, to Kent)
- Maidstone Borough Police (1943, to Kent)
- Margate Borough Police (1943, to Kent)
- Ramsgate Borough Police (1943, to Kent)
- Rochester City Police (1943, to Kent)
- Tiverton Borough Police (1943, to Devon)
- Tunbridge Wells Police Force (1943, to Kent)
- Winchester City Police (1942, to Hampshire Joint)
- Guildford Borough Police (1943 to Surrey)
- Reigate Borough Police (1943 to Surrey)
- Salisbury City Police (1943 to Wiltshire Constabulary)

=== Abolished under the Police Act 1946 ===
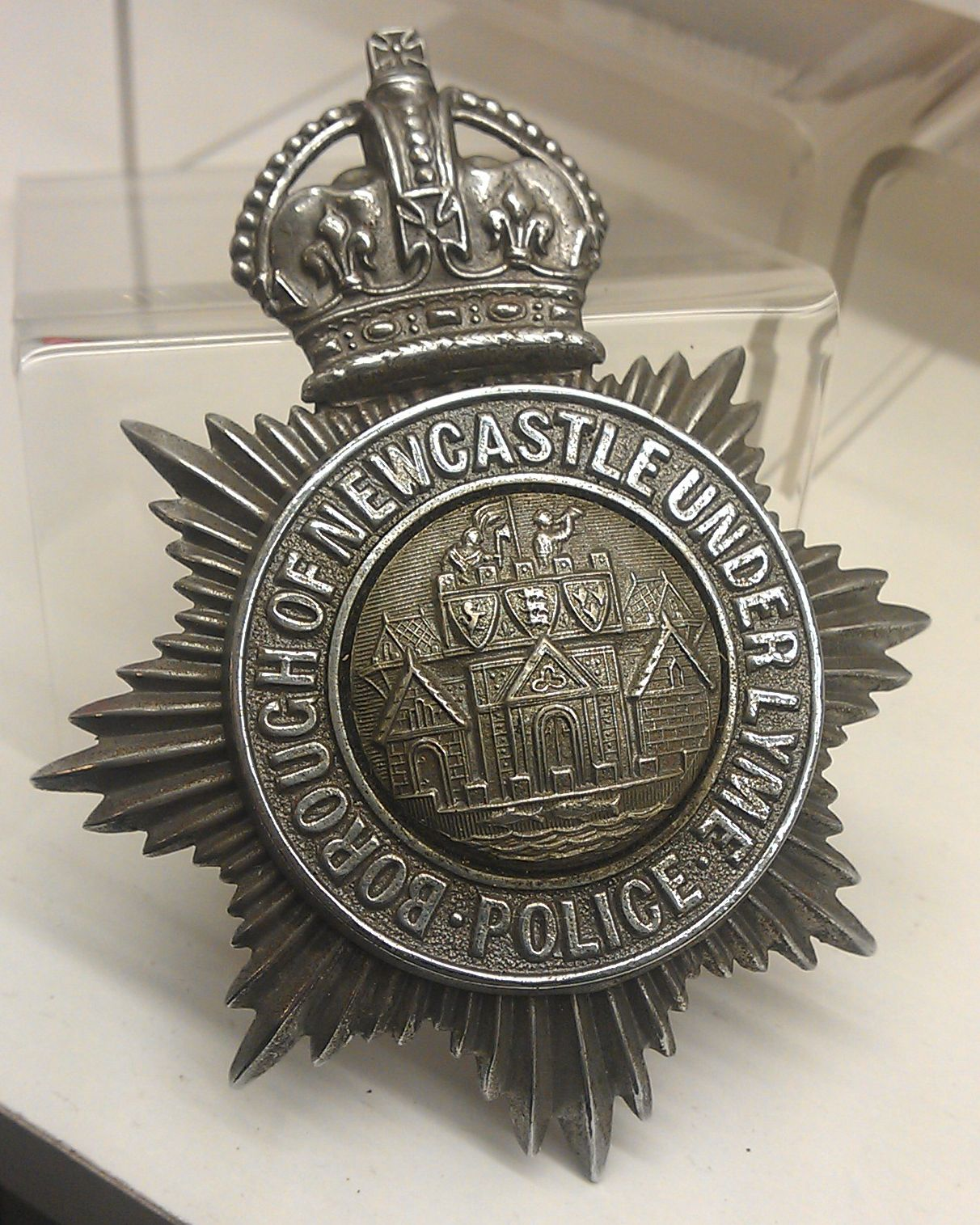
Borough of Newcastle-under-Lyme Police hat badge, in the collection of the Staffordshire County Museum and displayed at the Shire Hall, Stafford

Non-county borough forces

- Accrington Borough Police; to Lancashire Constabulary
- Ashton-under-Lyne Borough Police; to Lancashire Constabulary
- Bacup Borough Police; to Lancashire Constabulary
- Bedford Borough Police; to Bedfordshire Constabulary
- Boston Borough Police; to Lincolnshire Constabulary
- Carmarthen Borough Police; to Carmarthenshire Constabulary
- Chepping Wycombe Borough Police; to Buckinghamshire Constabulary
- Chesterfield Borough Police; to Derbyshire Constabulary
- Clitheroe Borough Police; to Lancashire Constabulary
- Colchester Borough Police; to Essex Constabulary
- Congleton Borough Police; to Cheshire Constabulary
- Glossop Borough Police; to Derbyshire Constabulary
- Grantham Borough Police; to Lincolnshire Constabulary
- Hartlepool Borough Police; to Durham Constabulary
- Hereford Borough Police; to Herefordshire Constabulary
- Hyde Borough Police; to Cheshire Constabulary
- Isles of Scilly Police (1947, to Cornwall)
- Kendal Borough Police; to Cumberland and Westmorland Constabulary
- Kidderminster Borough Police; to Worcestershire Constabulary
- King's Lynn Borough Police; to Norfolk Constabulary
- Lancaster Borough Police; to Lancashire Constabulary
- Leamington Spa Borough Police; to Warwickshire Constabulary
- Luton Borough Police; to Bedfordshire Constabulary
- Macclesfield Borough Police; to Cheshire Constabulary
- Neath Borough Police; to Glamorgan Constabulary
- Newark Borough Police; to Nottinghamshire Constabulary
- Newcastle-under-Lyme Borough Police; to Staffordshire Constabulary
- Penzance Borough Police; to Cornwall County Constabulary
- Peterborough City Police; to Peterborough Combined Police Force
- St Albans City Police; to Hertfordshire Constabulary
- Scarborough Borough Police; to North Riding Constabulary
- Shrewsbury Borough Police; to Shropshire Constabulary
- Stalybridge Borough Police; to Cheshire Constabulary
- Windsor Borough Police; to Berkshire Constabulary

County borough forces

- Chester City Police; to Cheshire Constabulary
- Canterbury City Police; to Kent Constabulary

County forces

- Anglesey Constabulary; to Gwynedd Constabulary
- Breconshire Constabulary; to Mid Wales Constabulary
- Caernarvonshire Constabulary; to Gwynedd Constabulary
- Cardiganshire Constabulary; to Carmarthenshire and Cardiganshire Constabulary
- Carmarthenshire Constabulary; to Carmarthenshire and Cardiganshire Constabulary
- Isle of Wight Constabulary; to Hampshire Constabulary
- Merionethshire Constabulary; to Gwynedd Constabulary
- Montgomeryshire Constabulary; to Mid Wales Constabulary
- Radnorshire Constabulary; to Mid Wales Constabulary
- Leicestershire Constabulary; to Leicestershire and Rutland Constabulary
- Liberty of Peterborough Constabulary; to Peterborough Combined Police Force
- Rutland Constabulary; to Leicestershire and Rutland Constabulary

=== Abolished under the Police Act 1964 ===
Borough forces

- Bath City Police; to Somerset and Bath Constabulary
- Barnsley Borough Police; to West Yorkshire Constabulary
- Barrow-in-Furness Borough Police; to Lancashire Constabulary
- Birkenhead Borough Police; to Cheshire Constabulary
- Blackburn Borough Police; to Lancashire Constabulary
- Blackpool Borough Police; to Lancashire Constabulary
- Bolton Borough Police; to Lancashire Constabulary
- Bootle Borough Police; to Liverpool and Bootle Constabulary
- Bournemouth Borough Police; to Dorset and Bournemouth Constabulary
- Brighton Borough Police; to Sussex Constabulary
- Burnley Borough Police; to Lancashire Constabulary
- Bury Borough Police; to Lancashire Constabulary
- Cambridge City Police; to Mid Anglia Constabulary
- Cardiff Borough Police; to South Wales Police
- Carlisle City Police; to Cumbria Constabulary
- Coventry City Police; to Warwickshire and Coventry Constabulary
- Derby Borough Police; to Derby County and Borough Constabulary
- Dewsbury Borough Police; to West Yorkshire Constabulary
- Doncaster Borough Police; to West Yorkshire Constabulary
- Eastbourne Borough Police; to Sussex Constabulary
- Exeter City Police; to Devon and Exeter Constabulary
- Gateshead Borough Police; to Durham Constabulary
- Great Yarmouth Borough Police; to Norfolk Constabulary
- Grimsby Borough Police; to Lincolnshire Constabulary
- Hastings Borough Police; to Sussex Constabulary
- Halifax Borough Police; to West Yorkshire Constabulary
- Huddersfield Borough Police; to West Yorkshire Constabulary
- Ipswich Borough Police; to Suffolk Constabulary
- Leicester City Police; to Leicester and Rutland Constabulary
- Lincoln City Police; to Lincolnshire Constabulary
- Liverpool City Police; to Liverpool and Bootle Constabulary
- Luton Borough Police (again); to Bedfordshire and Luton Constabulary
- Manchester City Police; to Manchester and Salford Police
- Merthyr Tydfil Borough Police; to South Wales Constabulary
- Middlesbrough Borough Police; to Teesside
- Newcastle upon Tyne Borough Police; to Northumberland Constabulary
- Newport Borough Police; to Gwent Police
- Northampton Borough Police; to Northampton and County Constabulary
- Norwich City Police; to Norfolk Constabulary
- Nottingham City Police; to Nottinghamshire Combined Constabulary
- Oldham Borough Police; to Lancashire Constabulary
- Oxford City Police; to Thames Valley Constabulary
- Plymouth City Police; to Devon and Cornwall Constabulary
- Portsmouth City Police; to Hampshire Constabulary
- Preston Borough Police; to Lancashire Constabulary
- Reading Borough Police; to Thames Valley Constabulary
- Rochdale Borough Police; to Lancashire Constabulary
- Rotherham Borough Police; to Sheffield and Rotherham Constabulary
- Salford City Police; to Manchester and Salford Police
- Sheffield Borough Police; to Sheffield and Rotherham Constabulary
- St Helens Borough Police; to Lancashire Constabulary
- Stockport Borough Police; to Cheshire Constabulary
- Stoke-on-Trent City Police; to Staffordshire County and Stoke-on-Trent Constabulary
- Southampton City Police; to Hampshire Constabulary
- Southend-on-Sea Borough Police; to Essex and Southend-on-Sea Joint Constabulary
- South Shields Borough Police; to Durham Constabulary
- Southport Borough Police; to Lancashire Constabulary
- Sunderland Borough Police; to Durham Constabulary
- Swansea Borough Police; to South Wales Constabulary
- Tynemouth Borough Police; to Northumberland Constabulary
- Wakefield City Police; to West Yorkshire Constabulary
- Wallasey Borough Police; to Cheshire Constabulary
- Warrington Borough Police; to Lancashire Constabulary
- Wigan Borough Police; to Lancashire Constabulary
- Worcester City Police; to West Mercia Constabulary
- York City Police; to York and North East Yorkshire Police

County/combined forces

- Bedfordshire Constabulary; to Bedfordshire and Luton Constabulary
- Berkshire Constabulary; to Thames Valley Constabulary
- Buckinghamshire Constabulary; to Thames Valley Constabulary
- Cambridgeshire Constabulary (original); to Mid Anglia Constabulary
- Carmarthenshire and Cardiganshire Constabulary; to Dyfed-Powys Constabulary
- Cornwall County Constabulary; to Devon and Cornwall Constabulary
- Cumberland and Westmorland Constabulary; to Cumbria Constabulary
- Derbyshire Constabulary; to Derby County and Borough Constabulary
- Devon County Constabulary; to Devon and Exeter Constabulary
- Devon and Exeter Constabulary; to Devon and Cornwall Constabulary
- Dorset Constabulary; to Dorset and Bournemouth Constabulary
- East Riding Constabulary; to York and North East Yorkshire Police
- East Suffolk Constabulary; to Suffolk Constabulary
- East Sussex Constabulary; to Sussex Constabulary
- Essex Constabulary; to Essex and Southend-on-Sea Joint Constabulary
- Glamorgan Constabulary; to South Wales Constabulary
- Herefordshire Constabulary; to West Mercia Constabulary
- Huntingdonshire Constabulary; to Mid Anglia Constabulary
- Isle of Ely Constabulary; to Mid Anglia Constabulary
- Leicestershire and Rutland Constabulary; to Leicester and Rutland Constabulary
- Mid Wales Constabulary; to Dyfed-Powys Constabulary
- Monmouthshire Constabulary; to Gwent Constabulary
- North Riding Constabulary; to York and North East Yorkshire Police
- Northamptonshire Constabulary; to Northampton and County Constabulary
- Northumberland County Constabulary; to Northumberland Constabulary
- Nottinghamshire Constabulary; to Nottinghamshire Combined Constabulary
- Peterborough Combined Police Force; to Mid Anglia Constabulary
- Oxfordshire Constabulary; to Thames Valley Constabulary
- Shropshire Constabulary; to West Mercia Constabulary
- Somerset Constabulary; to Somerset and Bath Constabulary
- Staffordshire Constabulary; to Staffordshire County and Stoke-on-Trent Constabulary
- West Riding Constabulary; to West Yorkshire Constabulary
- West Suffolk Constabulary; to Suffolk Constabulary
- West Sussex Constabulary; to Sussex Constabulary
- Warwickshire Constabulary; to Warwickshire and Coventry Constabulary
- Worcestershire Constabulary; to West Mercia Constabulary

=== Abolished by the Local Government Act 1972 ===
All territorial police forces in England and Wales (except the Metropolitan Police and City of London Police) were abolished and reconstituted at midnight on 31 March 1974/1 April 1974. This list shows the ones that existed then and their fate (ignoring minor transfers).

- Bedfordshire and Luton Constabulary; reconstituted as Bedfordshire Police
- Birmingham City Police; merged into West Midlands Police
- Bradford City Police; merged into West Yorkshire Metropolitan Police
- Bristol City Constabulary; merged into Avon and Somerset Constabulary
- Cheshire Constabulary; reconstituted, areas transferred to Merseyside Police and Greater Manchester Police
- Cumbria Constabulary; reconstituted
- Derby County and Borough Constabulary; reconstituted as Derbyshire Constabulary
- Devon and Cornwall Constabulary; reconstituted
- Dorset and Bournemouth Constabulary; reconstituted as Dorset Police
- Durham Constabulary; reconstituted, areas transferred to Cleveland Constabulary and Northumbria Police
- Dyfed-Powys Constabulary; reconstituted
- Essex and Southend-on-Sea Joint Constabulary; reconstituted as Essex Police
- Gloucestershire Constabulary; reconstituted, areas transferred to Avon and Somerset Constabulary
- Gwent Constabulary; reconstituted
- Gwynedd Constabulary; reconstituted as North Wales Police
- Hampshire Constabulary; reconstituted, areas transferred to Dorset Police
- Hertfordshire Constabulary; reconstituted
- Kent County Constabulary; reconstituted
- Kingston-upon-Hull City Police; merged into Humberside Police
- Lancashire Constabulary; reconstituted, areas transferred to Merseyside Police, Greater Manchester Police, Cheshire Constabulary and Cumbria Constabulary
- Leeds City Police; merged into West Yorkshire Metropolitan Police
- Leicester and Rutland Constabulary; reconstituted as Leicestershire Constabulary
- Lincolnshire Constabulary; reconstituted, areas transferred to Humberside Police
- Liverpool and Bootle Constabulary; merged into Merseyside Police
- Manchester and Salford Police; merged into Greater Manchester Police
- Mid-Anglia Constabulary; reconstituted as Cambridgeshire Constabulary
- Norfolk Constabulary; reconstituted
- Northampton and County Constabulary; reconstituted as Northamptonshire Constabulary
- Northumberland Constabulary; merged into Northumbria Police
- Nottinghamshire Combined Constabulary; reconstituted as Nottinghamshire Police
- Sheffield and Rotherham Constabulary; merged into South Yorkshire Police
- Somerset and Bath Constabulary; merged into Avon and Somerset Constabulary
- South Wales Constabulary; reconstituted
- Staffordshire County and Stoke-on-Trent Constabulary; reconstituted as Staffordshire Police
- Suffolk Constabulary; reconstituted
- Surrey Constabulary; reconstituted
- Sussex Constabulary; reconstituted
- Teesside Constabulary; merged into Cleveland Constabulary
- Thames Valley Constabulary; reconstituted
- Warwickshire and Coventry Constabulary; split between Warwickshire Constabulary and West Midlands Police
- West Mercia Constabulary; reconstituted
- West Midlands Constabulary; merged into West Midlands Police
- West Yorkshire Constabulary; split mainly between West Yorkshire Metropolitan Police, South Yorkshire Police and North Yorkshire Police
- Wiltshire Constabulary; reconstituted
- York and North East Yorkshire Police; split between North Yorkshire Police, Humberside Police, Durham Constabulary and Cleveland Constabulary.

== Irish police forces ==
The partition of Ireland under the terms of the Government of Ireland Act 1920 and the subsequent independence of the Irish Free State in 1922 led to the replacement of the Royal Irish Constabulary with the Garda Síochána (in the Free State, later Éire or Republic of Ireland) and by the Royal Ulster Constabulary (in Northern Ireland). Defunct police forces in Ireland:

- Royal Irish Constabulary (RIC) - replaced in 1922 by the Garda Síochána and the Royal Ulster Constabulary
- Belfast Town Police - absorbed into the Royal Irish Constabulary in 1865
- Londonderry Borough Police - absorbed into the Royal Irish Constabulary in 1870
- Dublin Metropolitan Police (DMP) - authority transferred to the Irish Free State in 1922; absorbed into the Garda Síochána in 1925
- Royal Ulster Constabulary (RUC) - dissolved in 2001, replaced by the Police Service of Northern Ireland
- Ulster Special Constabulary (USC or "B Specials") - replaced by the Ulster Defence Regiment and the RUC Reserve in 1970)

== Scottish police forces ==
Each police burgh had a police force originally, although many merged in the 19th century. The gradual process of amalgamation culminated with the creation of a single Police Service of Scotland in 2013.

Abolished 1912

- Govan Burgh Police to City of Glasgow Police
- Partick Burgh Police to City of Glasgow Police

Abolished 1930

The Local Government (Scotland) Act 1929 merged two pairs of county constabularies.

- Kinross-shire County Constabulary to Perthshire and Kinross-shire Constabulary
- Morayshire County Constabulary to Moray and Nairn Constabulary
- Nairnshire Constabulary to Moray and Nairn Constabulary
- Perthshire County Constabulary to Perthshire and Kinross-shire Constabulary

Abolished 1931–1946

- Stirling Burgh Police 16 November 1938 to Stirlingshire Constabulary
- Lerwick Burgh Police 29 May 1940 to Zetland Constabulary
- Zetland County Police 29 May 1940 to Zetland Constabulary

Abolished under the Police (Scotland) Act 1946

- Aberdeenshire Constabulary 16 May 1949 to Scottish North Eastern Counties Constabulary
- Banffshire Constabulary 16 May 1949 to Scottish North Eastern Counties Constabulary
- Berwickshire Constabulary to Berwick, Roxburgh and Selkirk Constabulary
- Bute County Constabulary to Renfrew and Bute Constabulary
- Clackmannanshire Constabulary 1949 to Strling and Clackmannan Constabulary
- Dumfriesshire County Police 16 February 1948 to Dumfries and Galloway Constabulary
- Dunfermline City Police 16 May 1949 to Fife Constabulary
- East Lothian Constabulary to Lothians and Peeblesshire Constabulary
- Fife County Constabulary 16 May 1949 to Fife Constabulary
- Kincardineshire Constabulary 16 May 1949 to Scottish North Eastern Counties Constabulary
- Kirkcaldy Burgh Police 16 May 1949 to Fife Constabulary
- Midlothian Constabulary to Lothians and Peeblesshire Constabulary
- Moray and Nairn Constabulary 16 May 1949 to Scottish North Eastern Counties Constabulary
- Peeblesshire Constabulary to Lothians and Peeblesshire Constabulary
- Renfrewshire Constabulary to Renfrew and Bute Constabulary
- Roxburghshire Constabulary to Berwick, Roxburgh and Selkirk Constabulary
- Selkirkshire constabulary to Berwick, Roxburgh and Selkirk Constabulary
- Stewartry of Kirkcudbright Police 16 February 1948 to Dumfries and Galloway Constabulary
- Stirlingshire Constabulary 1949 to Stirling and Clackmannan Constabulary
- West Lothian Constabulary to Lothians and Peeblesshire Constabulary
- Wigtownshire County Police 16 February 1948 to Dumfries and Galloway Constabulary

Abolished 1950s

- Dumbarton Burgh Police 1959 to Dunbartonshire Constabulary
- Dunbarton County Constabulary 1959 to Dunbartonshire Constabulary

Abolished 1960s

- Airdrie Burgh Police 1967 to Lanarkshire Constabulary
- Ayr Burgh Police 1968 to Ayrshire Constabulary
- Caithness Constabulary 1969 to Northern Constabulary
- Coatbridge Burgh Police 1967 to Lanarkshire Constabulary
- Greenock Burgh Police to Renfrew and Bute Constabulary
- Hamilton Burgh Police 1967 to Lanarkshire Constabulary
- Inverness Burgh Police 16 November 1969 to Inverness Constabulary
- Inverness-shire County Constabulary 16 November 1969 to Inverness Constabulary
- Kilmarnock Burgh Police to Ayrshire Constabulary
- Motherwell and Wishaw Burgh Police 1967 to Lanarkshire Constabulary
- Orkney Constabulary 1969 to Northern Constabulary
- Perth City Police 1964 to Perth and Kinross Constabulary
- Perthshire and Kinross-shire Constabulary 1964 to Perth and Kinross Constabulary
- Ross and Cromarty Constabulary 1963 to Ross and Sutherland Constabulary
- Sutherland Constabulary 1963 to Ross and Sutherland Constabulary
- Zetland Constabulary 1969 to Northern Constabulary

Abolished 1975

The Local Government (Scotland) Act 1973 created new police forces based on the new regions and island areas from 16 May 1975.

- Aberdeen City Police to Grampian Police
- Angus Constabulary to Tayside Police
- Argyll County Police to Strathclyde Police, part to Northern Constabulary
- Ayrshire Constabulary to Strathclyde Police
- Berwick, Roxburgh and Selkirk Constabulary to Lothian and Borders Police
- City of Glasgow Police to Strathclyde Police
- Dunbartonshire Constabulary to Strathclyde Police
- Dundee City Police to Tayside Police
- Edinburgh City Police to Lothian and Borders Police
- Inverness Constabulary to Northern Constabulary
- Lanarkshire Constabulary to Strathclyde Police
- The Lothians and Peebles Constabulary to Lothian and Borders Police
- Northern Constabulary (name retained by its successor after merger)
- Perth and Kinross Constabulary most to Tayside Police to Central Scotland Police
- Paisley Burgh Police to Strathclyde Police
- Renfrew and Bute Constabulary to Strathclyde Police
- Ross and Sutherland Constabulary to Northern Constabulary
- Scottish North Eastern Counties Constabulary to Grampian Police, part to Northern Constabulary
- Stirling and Clackmannan Police to Central Scotland Police, part to Strathclyde Police

Abolished 2013

An Act of the Scottish Parliament, the Police and Fire Reform (Scotland) Act 2012, created a single Police Service of Scotland – better known as Police Scotland – and a single Scottish Fire and Rescue Service with effect from 1 April 2013. (The functions of the British Transport Police, the Civil Nuclear Constabulary and the Ministry of Defence Police within Scotland were not affected).

- Central Scotland Police to Police Scotland
- Dumfries and Galloway Constabulary to Police Scotland
- Fife Constabulary to Police Scotland
- Grampian Police to Police Scotland
- Lothian and Borders Police to Police Scotland
- Northern Constabulary to Police Scotland
- Scottish Crime and Drug Enforcement Agency to Police Scotland
- Strathclyde Police to Police Scotland
- Tayside Police to Police Scotland

== Railway police forces ==
From the archives of the British Transport Police:

- Birmingham and Derby Railway Police (1836)
- Birmingham and Gloucester Railway Police (1836)
- Bristol and Exeter Railway Police (1836–1876)
- Bristol Joint Railway Station Police (1865–1948)
- Caledonian Railway Police (1845–1922)
- Cambrian Railways Police (1867–1923)
- Cardiff Railway Police (1897–1921)
- Cheshire Line Committee Police (1865–1948)
- Dundee and Arbroath Railway Police (1836–1923)
- Eastern Counties Railway Police (1836–1862)
- Eastern Union Railway Police (1847–1862)
- East Lincolnshire Railway Police (1848)
- Festiniog Railway Police (1884)
- Furness Railway Police (1844–1922)
- Great Central Railway Police (1897–1923)
- Great Eastern Railway Police (1862–1923)
- Great Northern Railway Police (1848–1923)
- Great Western Railway Police (1835–1947)
- Hull and Barnsley Railway Police (1885 – 1922, became part of North Eastern Railway Police)
- Hull and Selby Railway Police (1836/1854 – 1872, became part of North Eastern Railway Police)
- Lancashire and Yorkshire Railway Police (1833–1846)
- Lancaster and Carlisle Railway Police (1844–1879, became part of London & North Western Railway Police)
- London and Birmingham Railway Police (1833–1846)
- London, Brighton and South Coast Railway Police (1846–1923)
- London and Croydon Railway Police (1835–1846)
- London and Greenwich Railway Police (1833–1844)
- London, Midland and Scottish Railway Police (1923–1948)
- London and North Eastern Railway Police (1923–1948)
- London and North Western Railway Police (1846–1923)
- London and Southampton Railway Police (1838–1839)
- London and South Western Railway Police (1839–1923)
- London, Tilbury and Southend Railway Police (1854–1912, became part of Midland Railway Police)
- London Transport Police (April 1934 – 1 December 1958, became part of British Transport Commission)
  - Metropolitan Railway Police (1862-1933, became part of London Transport Police)
  - Underground Electric Railways Police (1910-1933, became part of London Transport Police)
  - Central London Railway Police (1900-1913, became part of Underground Electric Railways Police)
  - Manchester and Leeds Railway Police (1837–1847)
- Manchester, Sheffield and Lincolnshire Railway Police (1836–1844)
- Midland Counties Railway Police (1836–1844)
- Newcastle and North Shields Railway Police (1839 – )
- North British Railway Police (1840–1844)
- Northern and Eastern Railway Police (1840–1844)
- North Eastern Railway Police (1854–1923)
- North Staffordshire Railway Police (1845–1923)
- Pembroke and Tenby Railway Police (1859–1897)
- Stockton and Darlington Railway Police (1846–1876)
- South Devon Railway Police (1846–1876)
- South Eastern Railway Police (1836–1898)
- Southern Railway Police (1923–1948)
- South Eastern and Chatham Railway Police (1898–1923)
- South Wales Railway Police (1845–1863)
- Taff Vale Railway Police (1919–1923)
- York and North Midland Railway Police (1839–1854)

== Docks and port police forces ==
- Aberdeen Harbour Police
- Barry Docks Police (1884–1922)
- Boston Docks Police 1922 – 1963
- Bute Dock Police (1865–1922, merged with Great Western Railway Police)
- Commercial Docks Police (1810–1865, became part of Surrey Commercial Docks Police)
- Glasgow Marine Police (part of City of Glasgow Police)
- Dover Harbour Board Police - now renamed the Port of Dover Police
- Gloucester Dock Police (26 February 1836 – 25 November 1874, became part of Sharpness Dock Police)
- Gloucester and Berkley Docks Police (1827–1948)
- Greenock Harbour Police (1817 – ?, became part of Greenock Burgh Police)
- Grimsby Docks Police
- Hull Docks Police (1840–1893, became part of North Eastern Railway Police)
- Isle of Man Harbour Police
- Jersey Harbour Police
- Kingstown Harbour Police (1836–1924, became part of Dun Laoghaire Harbour Police)
- Larne Harbour Police (1877–2014)
- London and India Docks Police
- Londonderry Harbour Police (1882–1984)
- Manchester Ship Canal Police (1893–1993)
- Newport Harbour Police
- Port of London Authority Police (1909–28 February 1992, became Port of Tilbury Police)
- Southampton Harbour Board Police (1847–1980)
- Swansea Harbour Trust Police (?–1923, merged with Great Western Railway Police)
- Tyne Improvement Commission Docks and Piers Police (?–1949)

== Canal/river police forces ==
- Aberdare Canal Police (c.1846)
- Aire and Calder Navigation Police (1840–1948)
- Birmingham Canal Navigation Police (pre 1917 – 1948)
- Bristol River Police
- Gloucester Dock Police (1836–1874)
- Grand Junction Canal Police
- Grand Surrey Canal Police (1809 – 1855, became Grand Surrey Docks & Canal Police)
- Grand Surrey Docks & Canal Police (1855 – 1865, became part of Surrey Commercial Docks Police)
- Grand Union Canal Company Police (1929–1948)
- Lee Conservancy Police (1871–1948)
- Leeds and Liverpool Canal Police (1840 – ?)
- Manchester Ship Canal Police (1893–1993)
- Regents Canal and Dock Police (c.1840 – 1929)
- River Clyde Police (1858 – 1866, merged into City of Glasgow Police to become the Marine Division)
- River Tyne Police
- Sharpness Dock Police (1874–1948)
- Sheffield and South Yorkshire Navigation Police (1895 – ?)

== Airport police forces ==
- Aberdeen Airport Police
- Birmingham Airport Police
- British Airports Authority Constabulary
- East Midlands Airport Police
- Glasgow Airport Police (1966–1974)
- Isle of Man Airport Police – refounded 2007
- Liverpool Airport Police
- Luton Airport Police
- Manchester Airport Police
- Ministry of Civil Aviation Constabulary
- Newcastle Airport Police
- Southend-on-Sea Airport Police
- Teesside Airport Police

== Other police forces ==
=== Churches ===
- Chester Cathedral Constables
- Hereford Cathedral Close Constable
- Lichfield Cathedral Close Constable
- Metropolitan Tabernacle Police
- Salisbury Cathedral Constables (1611–1836; constables continued to be appointed until 2010)

=== Departmental constabularies ===
Merged to form the Admiralty Constabulary in 1949.

- Royal Marine Police
- Royal Marine Police Reserve
- Admiralty Civil Police

Merged to form the Ministry of Defence Police in 1974.

- Admiralty Constabulary
- Air Force Department Constabulary
  - Air Ministry Constabulary – merged into Air Force Department Constabulary 1964
- Army Department Constabulary

=== Markets ===
- Birmingham Market Police
- Liverpool Markets Police
- Manchester Market Police

=== Miscellaneous ===
- British Legion Volunteer Police Force
- Eton College Police (1859–1892)
- Oxford University Police (1829-2003)
- Cambridge University Constabulary

=== National ===
- National Crime Squad
- National Criminal Intelligence Service
- UK Atomic Energy Authority Constabulary (reconstituted as Civil Nuclear Constabulary)

=== Parks ===
==== London ====
- Barking and Dagenham Parks Constabulary
- Brent Parks Constabulary
- Greenwich Parks Constabulary
- Haringey Parks Constabulary
- London County Council Parks Police (1889–1908)
- Newham Community Constabulary (1998–2009)
- Redbridge Parks Police
- Royal Parks Constabulary – abolished only in England and Wales
- Southwark Parks Constabulary
- Sutton Parks Constabulary

==== Non-London ====
- Brighton Parks Police (1963–1990s)
- Birmingham Parks Police (1912–1962)
- Liverpool Parks Police (1882–1972)
- Manchester Park Police (Manchester Recreational Services Department Police)
- Wirral Parks Police
  - Birkenhead Parks Police – became Wirral Parks Police in 1974

== Non-police law enforcement agencies ==
- Assets Recovery Agency
- Border and Immigration Agency
- Her Majesty's Customs and Excise
- National Hi-Tech Crime Unit
- Serious Organised Crime Agency
- Waterguard
