= Liverpool Markets Police =

Liverpool Markets Police was a police force maintained by Liverpool City Council to police the markets owned by the city.

The force existed from at least 1837, was disbanded in 1976, re-formed in 1992 and finally disbanded in 2002.

== History ==
The first recorded market constable was Charles Worral, who was listed as such in 1837, and as "Head Constable" in 1851. In 1860 the market constables had formed into a formal police force under the control of the city's Markets Department, though records of the force are non-existent from then until after World War Two.

On 2 May 1946, the chief constable of Liverpool City Police, Herbert Winstanley, was approached for assistance in re-organising market policing. As a result, the uniformed staff at Stanley Meat Market were appointed as "market constables", and attested as special constables for the City of Liverpool. In 1962 the city's wholesale market relocated to a site opposite the meat market, and the Market Police expanded to provide policing for both markets.

A large-scale council reorganisation in 1972 saw the Parks Police and Airport Police disbanded as police forces and merged to form "Liverpool City Security Force". However, the Markets Police continued in a separate existence for a further four years, until they too were merged into the Security Force in 1976. As part of the merger, the Market Police officers were offered a choice between positions within the (better-paid) Security Force, subject to passing an entrance exam, or becoming gatekeepers at their current rate of pay.

At the start of the 1990s, a council working party that was looking into rising crime and disorder in the markets recommended that the Markets Police be re-formed, and a further council reorganisation in October 1992 led to the Markets Police being reintroduced, consisting of one inspector and thirteen constables. The first officers underwent six weeks’ training with Merseyside Police.

In 1995, the force had increased to one inspector (who left in 1996), two sergeants and fifteen constables, with cover being provided 24 hours a day, seven days a week. The country's first "Market Watch" scheme was established in 1997, in co-operation between the Markets Police Merseyside Police Crime Prevention Unit.

In 2002 the Markets Police consisted of four sergeants and ten constables. Most officers were on duty during the markets' opening hours, and two officers on duty when the market was closed, thus providing a 24-hour service. The force was funded by the city council and from a charge paid by the Market Traders Association. Training consisted of six weeks in-house, covering general police duties, followed by six months on-the-job.

The Markets Police were disbanded in 2002, when the city council privatised the markets, and their functions were taken on by a private security company.

== Powers ==
From 1992, Markets Police officers were not attested as constables, their powers being allegedly founded in common law and therefore have no powers of arrest above that of another member of the public.

== Vehicles ==
The Markets Police operated Ford Transit and Vauxhall Astra vans with police markings, which also carried firefighting and first aid equipment.

== Uniform ==
Prior to disbandment in 1976, the Markets Police wore a contemporary police uniform, with a tunic, and cap badge featuring a chrome Liver bird. Collar numbers with the words "Market Constable" were worn on the epaulettes. From 1992, they wore a contemporary standard police uniform, which at that time consisted of a dark blue jersey and jacket with dark blue trousers, a white shirt and black tie, and though tunics were issued they were rarely worn. The cap badge was chrome, with a Liver bird on a red centre, and a blue ring with the words "City of Liverpool Markets Police". Instead of St Edward's Crown, as commonly used in police badges, the post-1992 Markets Police cap badge used a "Norman Crown" to surmount the Brunswick star, purportedly in recognition of the origins of the City's markets in King John's charter of 1207. The cap band was Sillitoe tartan, in green and white, and the jersey patch rectangular with the words "Market Police".

== See also ==
- Birmingham Market Police
- City of London market constabularies
- Law enforcement in the United Kingdom
- List of defunct law enforcement agencies in the United Kingdom
