= Charles de Courcy Parry =

British police officer (1869–1948)

Charles de Courcy Parry CBE

His Majesty's Inspector of Constabulary for Wales
- In office 1 April 1927 – ?

Chief Constable of the Cumberland and Westmorland Constabulary
- In office 16 July 1902 – 1920

Chief Constable of the Bath City Police
- In office 16 March 1900 – 16 July 1902

Personal details
- Born: 29 November 1869
- Died: 19 November 1948 (aged 78)

Charles de Courcy Parry CBE (29 November 1869 – 19 November 1948) was a British police officer who served as Chief Constable of the Cumberland and Westmorland Constabulary from 16 July 1902 to 1920 and on 1 April 1927 was appointed His Majesty's Inspector of Constabulary for Wales.

Parry was the youngest son of Captain F. J. Parry, who had also served as HM Inspector of Constabulary and was previously chief constable of Nottingham City Police and Derbyshire Constabulary. Before joining Cumberland and Westmorland, Parry had served in his father's Derbyshire force, Bristol City Constabulary (as a chief inspector) and Monmouthshire Constabulary (where he was superintendent commanding the Risca division from 1894 to 1899), before being appointed deputy chief constable of Kent County Constabulary in 1899 and then chief constable of Bath City Police on 16 March 1900.

He was appointed Officer of the Order of the British Empire (OBE) in the 1918 Birthday Honours and Commander of the Order of the British Empire (CBE) in the 1920 civilian war honours.

He married Gwendoline Mary Wilkinson at Risca on 11 September 1895.
