= Newport Borough Police =

Newport Borough Police may refer to:

- Newport Borough Police (Monmouthshire) a force covering the borough of Newport in Monmouthshire, England
- Newport Borough Police (Isle of Wight), a force covering the borough of Newport on the Isle of Wight, England
