= City of London market constabularies =

The City of London market constabularies are three small constabularies responsible for security at Billingsgate, New Spitalfields and Smithfield markets run by the City of London Corporation.

== Powers and duties ==
Market constables now perform a mixture of security and emergency medical work and are no longer recognised as police officers and are not attested as such. However, their uniforms still say "Markets Police" out of tradition and their 'police-type' role. They are responsible for enforcing market bylaws, rules and regulations. They are not expected to get into serious confrontational roles, with more serious related work being handed over to the City of London Police or Metropolitan Police Service.

=== New Spitalfield Markets Constabulary ===
The organisation has a number of members:

- Head of security (Grade E): 1
- Deputy Head of security (Grade C++): 1
- Sergeants (Grade C): 3
- Constables (Grade B): 12 (has an establishment of 13).

== Uniforms ==
Constables wear modern-day police uniforms and may wear: blue or white shirt and tie, protective stab vest, high visibility jackets and black (sometimes white-topped) peaked caps with the City of London badge.

== See also ==
- Birmingham Market Police
- Liverpool Markets Police
- Law enforcement in the United Kingdom
- List of law enforcement agencies in the United Kingdom, Crown Dependencies and British Overseas Territories
- Market (place)
