= Richard Lewis (police officer) =

British senior police officer

Chief Constable Richard Lewis
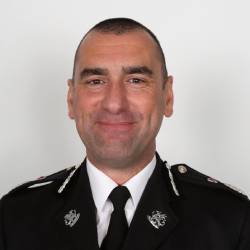
- Portrait of Lewis

Chief constable of Cleveland Police
- In office 2019–2021
- Preceded by: Lee Freeman
- Succeeded by: Helen McMillan

Chief constable of Dyfed-Powys Police
- In office 2021–2025
- Preceded by: Claire Parmenter
- Succeeded by: Ifan Charles

Personal details
- Born: Carmarthenshire, Wales
- Profession: Police officer

Richard Lewis is a former chief constable of Dyfed-Powys Police and Cleveland Police.

== Career ==
Richard Lewis was born in Carmarthenshire in West Wales. Prior to being chief constable for Dyfed-Powys he served as the chief constable of Cleveland Police from April 2019. He started his policing career with Dyfed–Powys Police in 2000, where he worked in Uniform and CID. Lewis held every rank from constable to deputy chief constable whilst at Dyfed Powys Police, prior to becoming chief constable at Cleveland. In April 2025, Lewis retired as chief constable of Dyfed Powys Police to take up the role of the chief executive of the Animal and Plant Health Agency.

Lewis has suggested an all-Wales police force "Heddlu Cymru/Wales Police" and stated, "(If) the Americans can put a man on the moon in eight years, I think we can unify four police services. Doing away with those borders means we can provide a more effective service".

Lewis came into some criticism after welcoming the WRU's decision to ban the song "Delilah".

== Honours ==

Ribbon	Description	Notes
	Queen Elizabeth II Diamond Jubilee Medal	2012; UK version of this medal

Police appointments
Preceded by Lee Freeman	Chief constable of Cleveland Police; 2019 to 2021	Succeeded by Helen McMillan
Preceded by Claire Parmenter	Chief constable of Dyfed-Powys Police; 2021 to 2025	Succeeded by Ifan Charles
