= Manchester Parks Police =

Manchester Parks Police, later Manchester Recreational Services Department Police, was a small police force maintained by Manchester Corporation (later Manchester City Council) to police the parks and open spaces of Manchester, United Kingdom. It was formed in 1959 and disbanded in 1991.

== History ==
In 1959, the Corporation formed a Park Ranger Service, which became known as the Parks Police on 9 June 1959. The force were never attested as constables, so did not have police powers, although they wore police uniforms with a specific cap badge (which did not include the Queen's crown).

A dog section was formed in 1964, and in 1968 personal radios were issued to officers. In 1970, the force also became responsible for patrolling the city's schools. In 1972, the force had 38 officers, commanded by a chief inspector (and by 1973, a superintendent).

In 1974, the force changed name to Manchester Recreational Services Department Police, and as well as parks, were responsible for security in sports centres, schools, libraries, public baths and laundries. The first female officer was appointed in 1978. In 1979, a council report discussed vandalism and anti-social behaviour at council properties, where it was spending £1.3m annually on security costs, including private security and the RSD police, but declined to form a single security force for the city.

In 1980, the force had 60 members, and regularly had to deal with young people sniffing solvents, particularly at Heaton Park.

In 1985, the park police were preferred for dealing with anti-social behaviour in the city's libraries, instead of calling the local police force, Greater Manchester Police. The director of the City's Cultural Services Department said that the park police were "more reliable than turning up then the police, and tend to handle things in a more authoritative and sensitive way". By 1987, park police were being called to incidents in libraries once a week, to deal with bomb scares, obscene phone calls and indecent exposure.

In December 1987 it was proposed to disband the park police force, then 45-strong, and replace them with park wardens, with a green uniform, as part of a plan to make 3,750 redundancies across the council to save money. The decision was postponed in June 1988 for further consultation with the trade unions, and although by March 1989 the position of the council was that the force had been disbanded, the officers were still working.

The force was finally disbanded in 1991, when it consisted of 1 superintendent, 4 sergeants, 8 dog handlers and 18 constables, and 6 cemetery patrol officers, and replaced with a park ranger service.

== See also ==
- Law enforcement in the United Kingdom
- List of defunct law enforcement agencies in the United Kingdom
