= Barking and Dagenham Parks Constabulary =

Barking and Dagenham Parks Constabulary was a small constabulary responsible for policing the parks and open spaces of the London Borough of Barking and Dagenham.

The LBBD Parks Constabulary was renamed The LBBD Parks Police in 2005 before being disbanded on 31 March 2010 .

Members of the constabulary were sworn as constables under section 18, Ministry of Housing and Local Government Provision Order Confirmation (Greater London Parks and Open Spaces) Act 1967. Such constables had the powers of a constable to deal with by-laws regulations and all enactments relating to parks and open spaces under their control.

- Law enforcement in the United Kingdom
- List of defunct law enforcement agencies in the United Kingdom
