= Brighton Parks Police =

Park police of Brighton, United Kingdom

Brighton Parks Police was a park police force maintained by Brighton Borough Council for the borough of Brighton, England.

== History ==
The first suggestion of a park police forces was by the local chief constable in 1961. He stated that a dedicated park police force would allow the public to use the parks "...freely and safely, without fear of molestation and without there being undue rowdyism or improper conduct."

In 1962, the uniformed park keepers were reorganised into a single section under a Park Keeper Supervisor, and in 1963 were renamed "Park Police". A number of park keepers had already been appointed as constables, by virtue of the Brighton Corporation Act 1931 (21 & 22 Geo. 5. c. cix) but following the formation of the unified service all additional staff were also attested. In 1963, the force consisted of one Supervisor, one Assistant Supervisor and 14 Park Constables. Two constables were made redundant in 1981, and in 1984 the Parks Police underwent review.

The 1984 report found that 10 constables, organised in eight sections of one or two men, were responsible for 2,500 acres of open space, and the constables based at East Brighton and Hollingbury Park were responsible for the parks in the outlying areas of the borough. The two other constables provided relief cover for sickness and rest days. The Assistant Supervisor also provided some early morning cover and out-of-hours response. The force operated three vans, and had access to a Land Rover if required. Constables worked a 37-hour, 5-day week, year-round from dawn till dusk, and took rest days during the week so that as many as possible were available at weekends, when the parks were busiest. Some personal radios were used, but no formal training was provided, though the majority of constables came from police or security backgrounds.

The Brighton Corporation Act 1931 expired in 1986. The recommendation of the 1984 review was that section 77 of the Public Health Amendment Act 1907 should be used to attest staff as constables, though the powers it would have provided are unclear. However, cost-cutting in the 1990s caused the Parks Police to be disbanded. Some officers took early retirement, and others transferred to become "Urban Rangers".

== Uniform ==
Officers wore a uniform in the style of the contemporary police uniform, consisting of a dark blue tunic with chrome buttons (in later years a dark blue jersey was introduced), blue shirt, black tie and peaked cap. The uniform was supplied by the council transport department and was similar to that issued to bus inspectors, but with woven shoulder patches with the words "Park Police". The cap badge was that issued to all uniformed staff of the borough council.

== See also ==
- Brighton Borough Police
- Law enforcement in the United Kingdom
- List of defunct law enforcement agencies in the United Kingdom
