= Port of Liverpool Police =

Specialist, Non-Home Office Police Force in Liverpool, UK

Agency overview
- Formed: 1975

Jurisdictional structure
- Operations jurisdiction: Port of Liverpool, UK
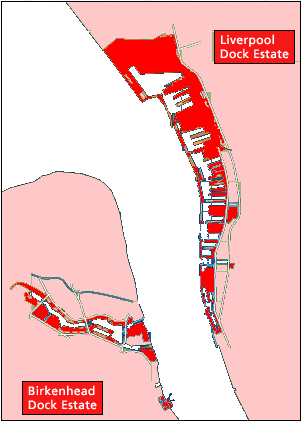
- Map of Port of Liverpool Police's jurisdiction
- Area: 181 km^{2}
- Population: Port staff and passengers

Operational structure
- Headquarters: Liverpool Freeport
- Sworn members: 46
- Agency executive: Martin Humphreys, chief officer
- Divisions: 7

Facilities
- Stations: 2

Website
- Force web site

The Port of Liverpool Police is a non-Home Office ports police force with responsibility for Liverpool, Bootle, Birkenhead, Ellesmere Port and Eastham Dock Estates and Freeports, as well as the Manchester Ship Canal areas in the north-west of England.

== Mandate ==
The Port of Liverpool police is accountable to the Department for Transport. Its officers receive their long service and good conduct medals from the department.

== Role, function and organisation ==
The Port of Liverpool Police is established under the Mersey Docks and Harbour (Police) Order 1975.

This legislation sets out that constables of the force hold the full powers of the office of constable within the port police area, which is defined as the port and any place within 1 mile of the limits of the port.

The Marine Navigation Act 2013 provides a limited extension to this jurisdiction if a chief constable of a police area consents. This allows port police officers to use police powers in relation to port area policing matters anywhere in the police area where consent has been granted – it does not grant full police powers in relation to non-port policing matters.

As of July 2014, Port of Liverpool Police were applying to the chief constable of Merseyside for such consent within Merseyside police area.

The force employs under 50 police officers, of whom five comprise the criminal investigation department.

== Rank structure ==
The rank structure of the Port of Liverpool Police is smaller than that used in most UK police forces, as shown below.

All officers have the powers of a constable, regardless of rank.

- Chief officer - The post is currently held by Martin Humphreys.
- Inspector (deputy chief officer) - Stephen Christian.
- Sergeant - various.
- Constable - various.

=== Table of ranks ===
Port of Liverpool Police rank structure
Rank	Constable	Sergeant	Inspector (Deputy chief officer)	Chief officer
Insignia	PC Epaulette	PS Epaulette		n/a

As with Home Office police forces, officers are required to sit and pass the same promotion examinations (Objective Structured Performance Related Examination (OSPRE)) until recently; replaced by Sergeants' or Inspectors' NPPF Step 2 Exam, National Investigators' (NIE) Exam or IPLDP Police Legal Exam) to be considered for promotion to sergeant and inspector. Further promotion within the force falls down to selection, merit and budget allowance.

== History ==
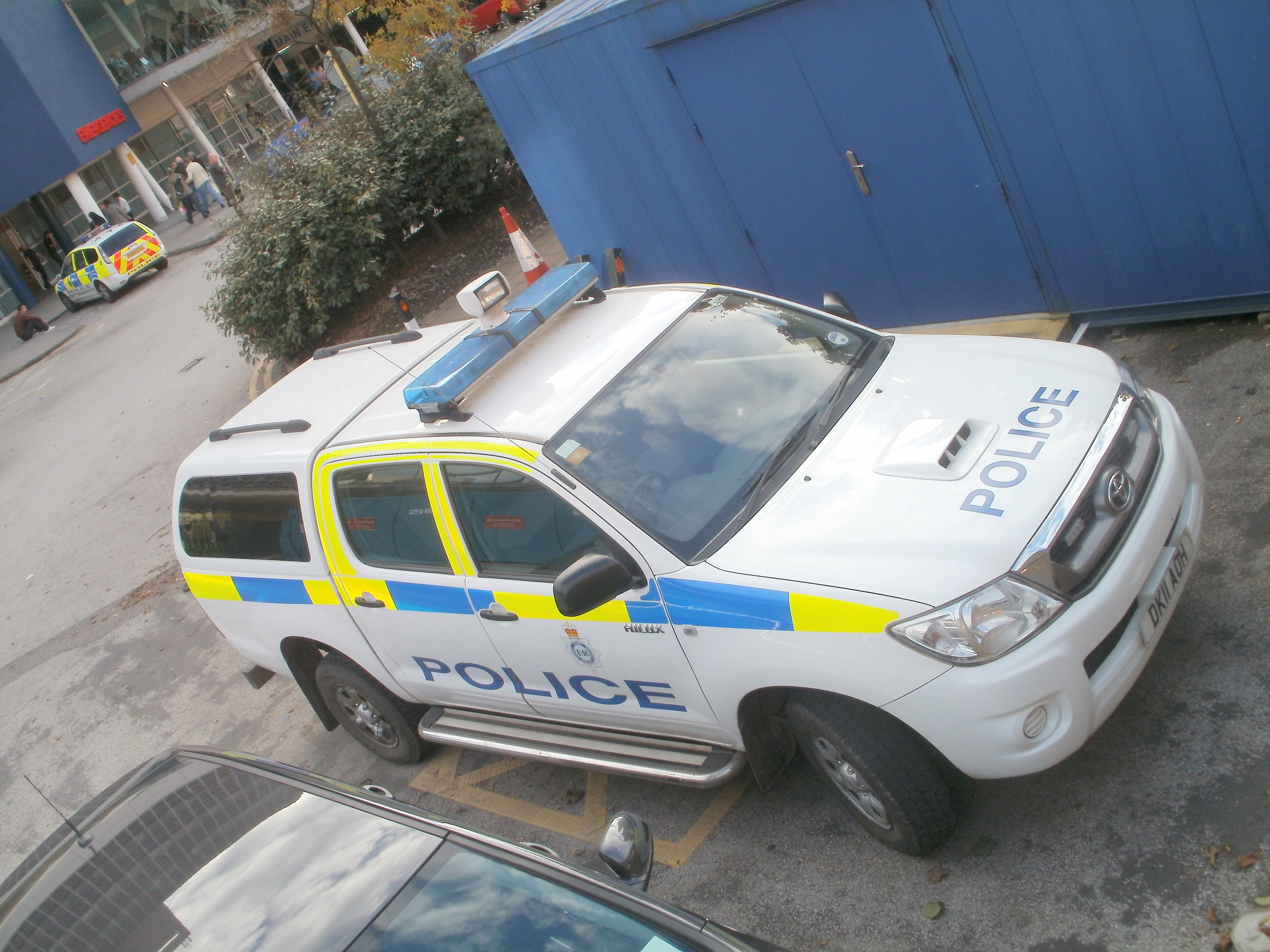
Port of Liverpool Police Vehicle (2012)

In its present form, the force has existed since 19 June 1975, when it was created by the Mersey Docks and Harbour (Police) Order 1975. The dock has had a dedicated police force throughout its history, though not always constantly:

- From 1811 to 1837, the Liverpool Dock Police patrolled much the same area until its merger with the Liverpool Borough Police Force
- In 1852, 40 officers were transferred to the Liverpool Fire Brigade for the purpose of policing the docks
- In 1865 the River Mersey Police took responsibility for policing these areas until 1920, after which they were policed by territorial forces
- In 1975, with the passing of the above statutory instrument, the current body was formed. It became fully operational in July 1976

The Manchester Ship Canal had a separate police force, the Manchester Ship Canal Police, from its founding in 1893 until 1993.

== Jurisdiction ==
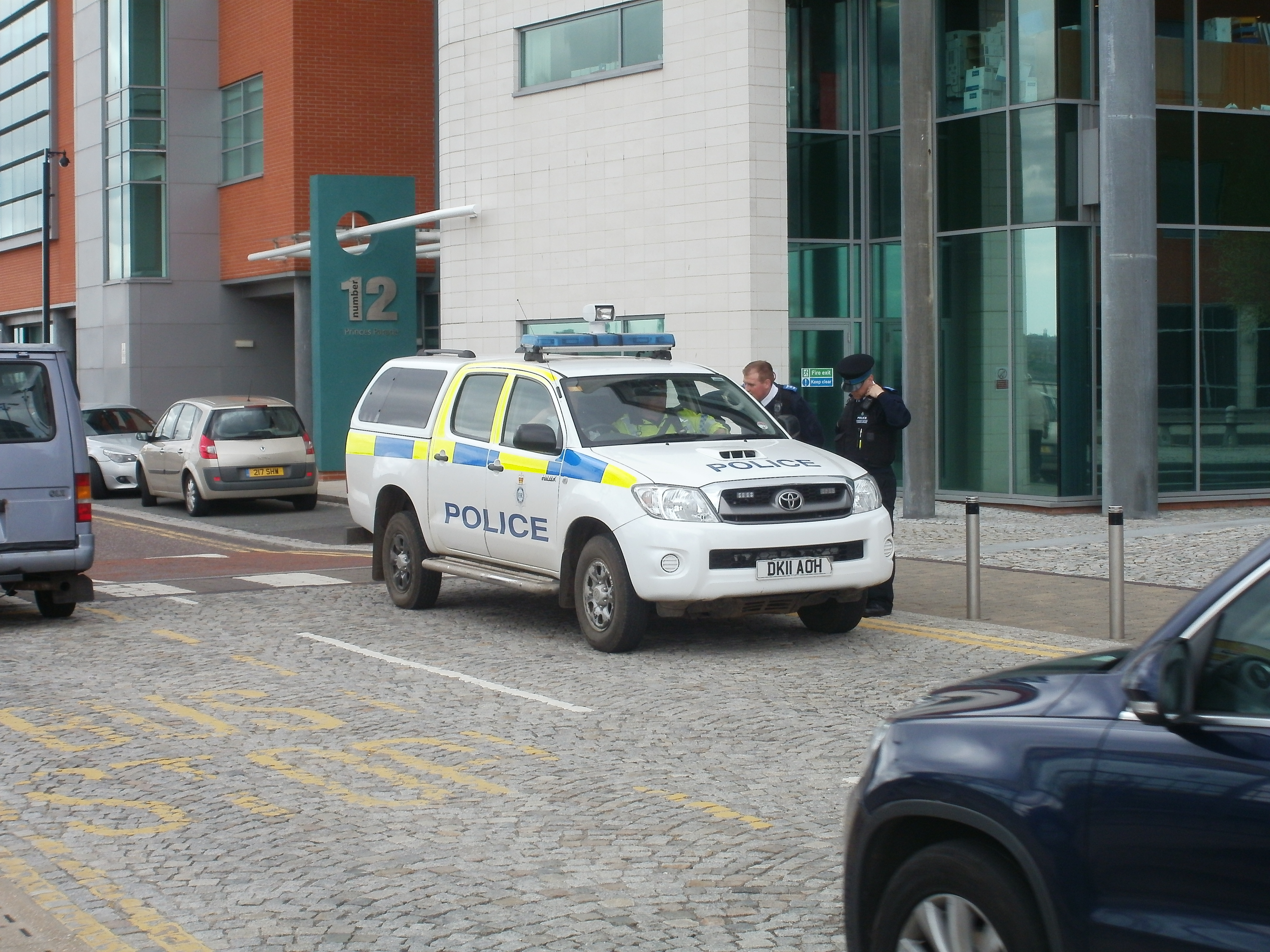
Port of Liverpool Police Toyota 4x4 marked police vehicle (2013)

The force has jurisdiction over the whole of the Port of Liverpool as defined by the Mersey Docks and Harbour Act 1971 and its amendments. It also polices the Manchester Ship Canal. However Merseyside Police, as the territorial police force with statutory responsibility for policing the whole of Merseyside has concurrent jurisdiction in the port area.

The Port of Liverpool Police has entered into a memorandum of understanding with Merseyside Police, which sets out how the two forces operate together and the use of certain resources, for example, Merseyside Police custody facilities. The port police responds to the report of all crimes and emergencies within the port area. However, as per the memorandum, Merseyside Police will take over the handling of the following matters whilst assisted by the Port of Liverpool Police:

- Murder
- Rape
- Serious life-threatening assaults
- Armed crime
- Crime requiring significant or specialist resources to investigate
- Fatal traffic collisions
- Large scale disorder
- Terrorism and subversion
- Extradition matters

== See also ==
- Merseyside police
- Mersey Tunnels Police
- Law enforcement in the United Kingdom
- Port of Liverpool
- Liverpool Cathedral Constables
