= Southampton Harbour Board Police =

Police force for the Port of Southampton (1847–1980)

Southampton Harbour Board Police was a small police force for the Port of Southampton, founded in 1847 and disbanded in 1980. Officers were sworn in under section 79 of the Harbours, Docks, and Piers Clauses Act 1847.

== History ==
The force started out in 1847 with one sergeant and six constables, and its jurisdiction included Southampton Town Quay and the Royal Pier, which had opened in 1833, and up to one mile from the Quay, meaning officers had jurisdiction throughout the city centre. The force operated from a small office on the quay.

A new charter was issued to Southampton Harbour Board in 1954 along with a new coat of arms, which were adopted by the police force for their helmet plate. Southampton Harbour Board was merged with the British Transport Docks Board in 1967 under the Southampton Harbour Reorganisation Scheme 1967, bringing the force under the control of the British Transport Police (BTP). BTP officers were responsible for policing the nearby Southampton Docks but SHBP officers continued to wear their own insignia and police the Town Quay area and pier.

The Town Quay, located between the Eastern and Western Southampton Docks, served passenger ferries to the Isle Of Wight and between Hythe and Southampton across Southampton Water as today. Other traffic included Isle of Wight cargo boats and flower boats from the Channel Islands. The town's Royal Pier was situated within the Town Quay area and included a pavilion, used frequently for dances and concerts. One of the many duties of the SHBP was to activate the navigational beacons used by ships pilots for berthing at the Ocean Terminal.

PC Alfred Hanks, a member of the force, was commended for bravery after rescuing a man who fell into the docks in March 1975:

A ship-keeper, Fred Adlington, heard cries for help coming from the water just before 9.30pm. Pc Alf Hanks commandeered a nearby dinghy and rowed out directed by PC William Jurd who was shouting instructions and using a powerful lamp from the pontoon. But Alf found only one oar in the dinghy so he had to scull- something he had never done before- which made progress particularly difficult. It took about ten or fifteen minutes to reach a man who was found hanging onto a buoy about 150 yards out from the quay. Three sailors from HMS Wessex had got hold of another boat, but it had no oars at all. They attempted to reach the man by using a piece of wood as a paddle but the strong current prevented them from getting to him. The man was nearly unconscious when Alf finally got him into the boat and began the scull back.

Thirty-five-year-old Christopher Lewis, living at the Salvation Army Hostel in Oxford Street, was taken to Southampton General Hospital and later discharged. PC Hanks was commended by Eric Haslem, chief constable of the British Transport Police and received a presentation pen set for his actions.

== Disbandment ==
In 1980, SHDP consisted of just five constables, whose average age was over 60. The Royal Pier was closed owing to instability, following which the police force was disbanded. BTP took on responsibility for policing the Town Quay until they were withdrawn from docks across the country following the privatisation of the British Transport Docks Board as Associated British Ports.

== See also ==
- British Transport Police
- Law enforcement in the United Kingdom
- List of defunct law enforcement agencies in the United Kingdom
