= Brent Parks Constabulary =

Brent Parks Constabulary was a specialized small-scale force responsible for patrolling the parks and open spaces parks and open spaces within the London Borough of Brent. Members of the Borough Security Department were appointed as constables starting in 1979, and the designation "Brent Parks Constabulary" was officially adopted around 1993. By 1993, the force was composed of 17 constables and 2 supervisors. They did not receive any formal police training, which "caused some concern" in the Metropolitan Police.

== See also ==
- Law enforcement in the United Kingdom
- List of defunct law enforcement agencies in the United Kingdom
