= Manchester Ship Canal Police =

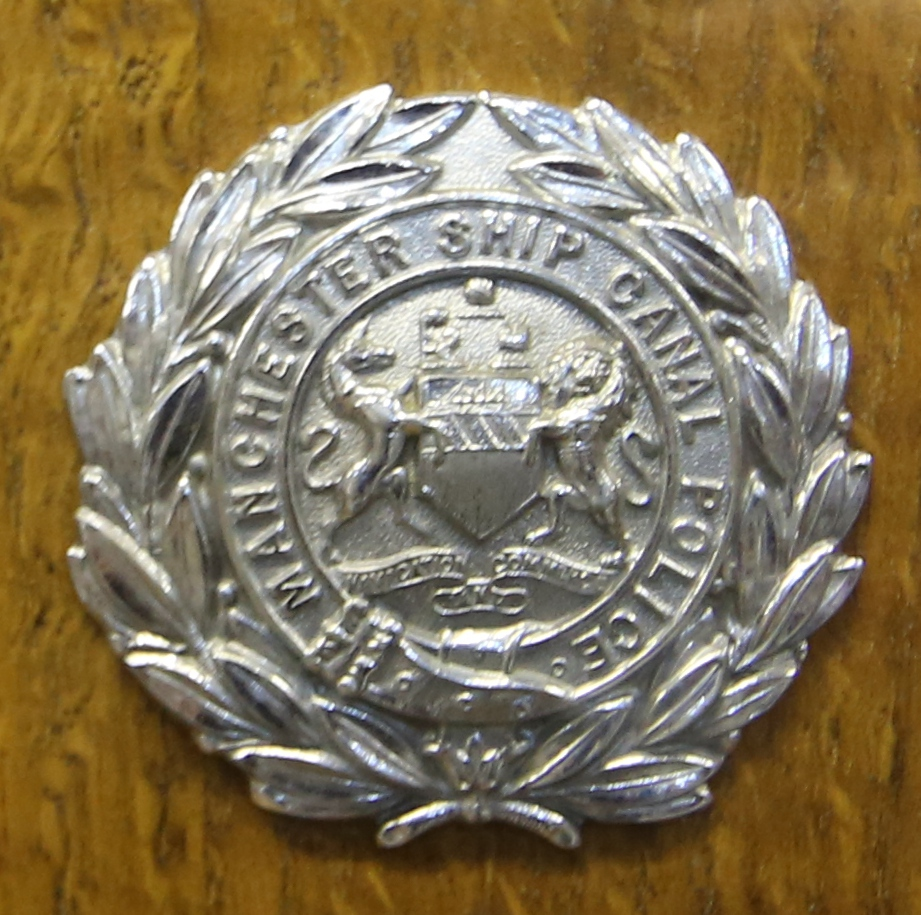
The Badge of Manchester Ship Canal Police

Manchester Ship Canal Police (also known as Manchester Dock Police and the Port of Manchester Police) was a police force in the United Kingdom that was responsible for policing the Manchester Ship Canal. It was maintained by the Manchester Ship Canal Company between 26 December 1893, when the canal opened, and 31 January 1993.

On formation in 1893 the force consisted of one superintendent and 15 other ranks. In 1977, it consisted of 103 constables. Members of the force were appointed as constables under two acts of Parliament: the Canals Offences Act 1840 (3 & 4 Vict. c. 50) and the Harbours, Docks and Piers Clauses Act 1847 (10 & 11 Vict. c. 27) (which was incorporated by and with the Manchester Ship Canal Act 1885 (48 & 49 Vict. c. clxxxviii)). Their jurisdiction extended from Manchester to Eastham, Merseyside where the Manchester Ship Canal started at the River Mersey, along the length of the canal and within one mile of same and to its subsidiary waterways, canals and adjoining works.

The canal is now patrolled by the Port of Liverpool Police.

== See also ==
- Port of Liverpool Police
- Greater Manchester Police
- Law enforcement in the United Kingdom
- List of defunct law enforcement agencies in the United Kingdom
