= Smithfield Market Hall =

Listed building in Manchester, England

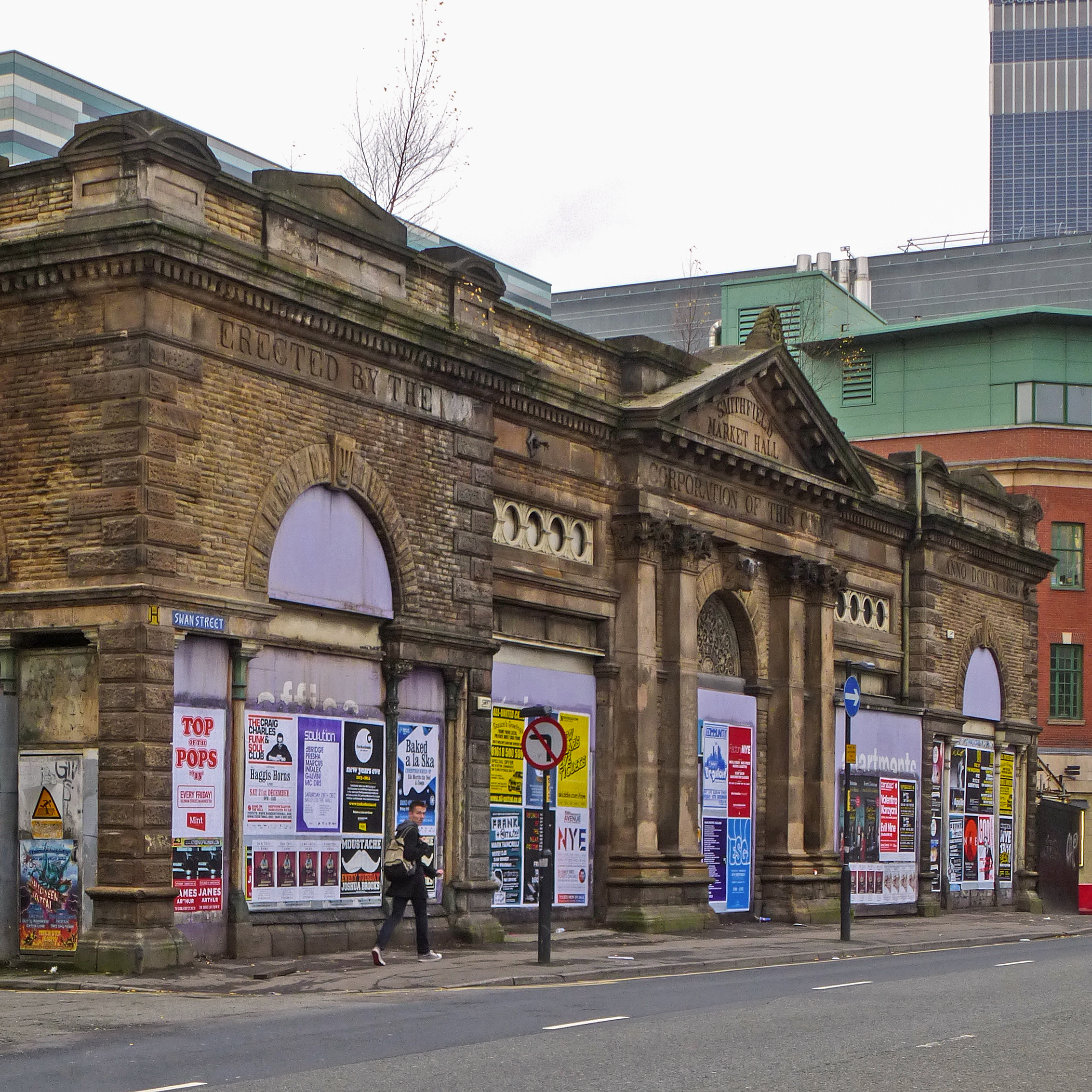
- Smithfield Market Hall viewed from Swan Street in 2013, before renovation in 2017

General information
- Type: Food hall, formerly a larger market hall
- Architectural style: Neoclassical
- Location: 39–45 Swan Street, Manchester, United Kingdom
- Coordinates: 53.485473°N 2.234876°W
- Construction started: 1857
- Completed: 1858

Design and construction
- Architect: Isaac Holden
- Architecture firm: Isaac Holden and Sons
- Designations

Listed Building – Grade II
- Official name: Smithfield Market Hall
- Designated: 7 October 1973
- Reference no.: 1254687

Smithfield Market Hall is a renovated market hall on Swan Street in Manchester, England, which houses a food hall known as Mackie Mayor. The hall reopened in 2017 after years of dereliction.

== History ==
The area now known as part of the Northern Quarter in Manchester was named Smithfield Market in May 1822 because the potato market had moved to the area in 1820. As the market became more popular, more land was acquired in 1850. Built between 1857 and 1858 and roofed over with iron trusses in 1865, the hall replaced an earlier butchers' shambles on the same site. As the area continued to expand, a retail fish market was built the same year; the building has since been demolished however its extension built in two stages has survived.

At its peak in 1897, the market place covered four and a half acres in Manchester City Centre stretching from Swan Street in Ancoats in the north, Thomas Street in the Northern Quarter, Shudehill to the east and Oak Street to the west.

In these various markets the public could obtain fish, meat, fruit and vegetables; its influence was such that it spread further into Ancoats and through its Italian community spawned an ice-cream manufacturing industry. The market was policed at various points by Manchester Market Police.

=== Mackie Mayor ===
The Mackie Mayor is the only remaining fully intact building from the former Smithfield market. Opened in 1858, it was initially used as a market, but had lain empty since the early 1990s. Other parts of the market have since been converted into other uses such as the fish market.

The original Smithfield Market was closed in 1972 and parts of the complex were demolished, the market stalls were relocated to West Gorton at the New Smithfield Market. The Market Hall was Grade II listed in 1973.

== Gallery ==
Depictions of Smithfield Market Hall
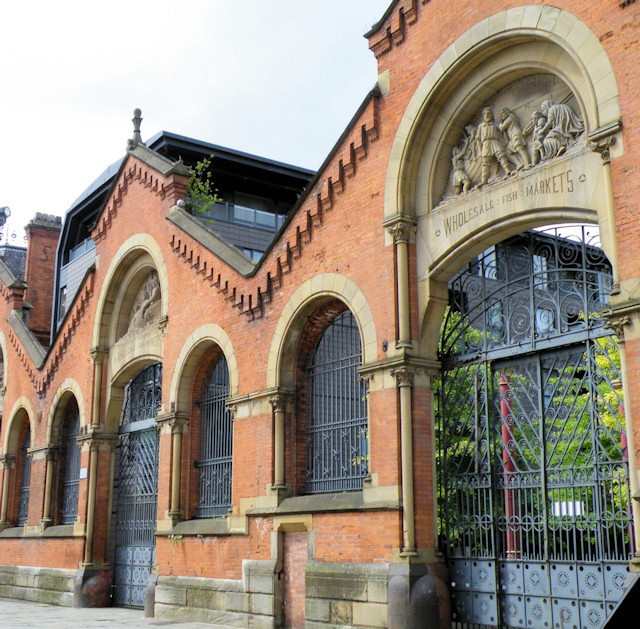
Former fish market

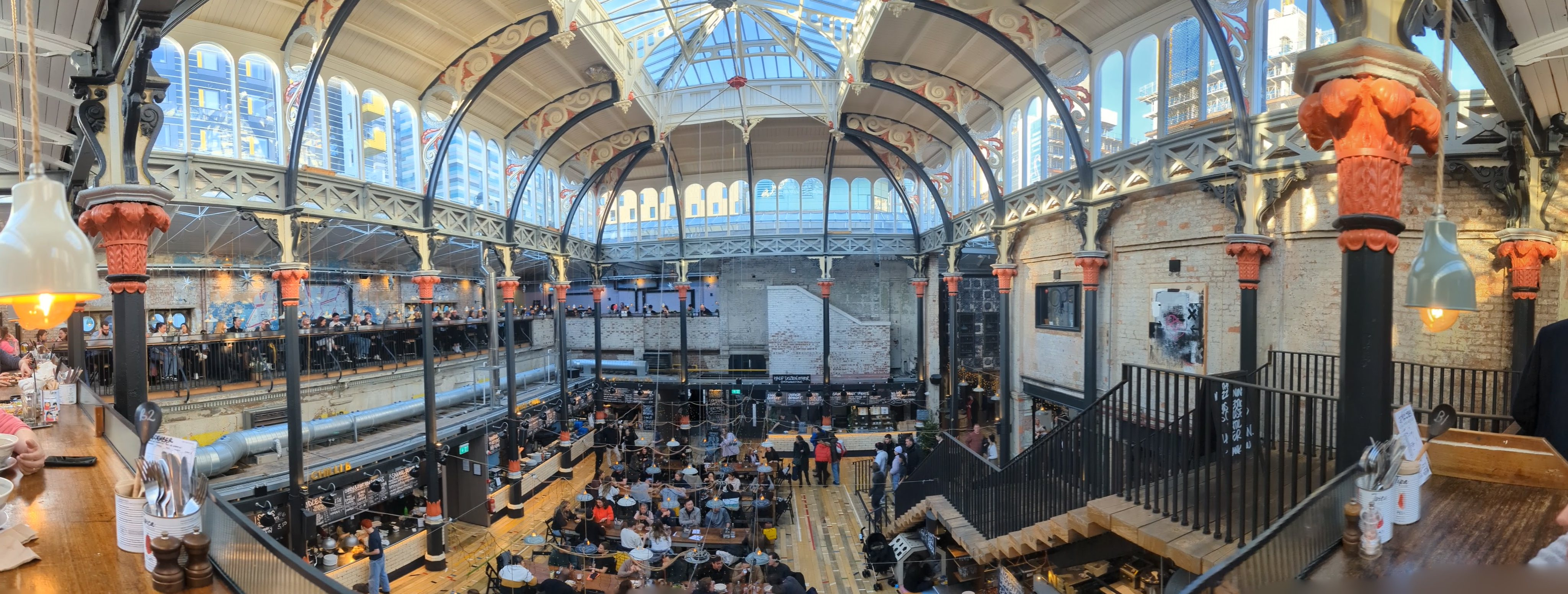
Panoramic picture of the inside of Smithfield Market Hall, home to food hall Mackie Mayor
