= Lee Conservancy Police =

Former police force in England

The Lee Conservancy Police was the name given to a body of constables who policed the Lee Navigation, and were maintained by the Lee Conservancy Board, from at least 1871 until the canal system was nationalised in 1948, when they became part of the British Transport Police.

== History ==
The Lee Conservancy Board was established under the Lee Conservancy Act 1868 (31 & 32 Vict. c. cliv) with effect from 1 April 1869. The Board replaced the former Trustees of the Lea Navigation, and was responsible for 50 miles of navigable waterways which included the Lea Navigation and, from 1911, the River Stort Navigation.

Although police officers appear to have been appointed to keep order in the Hackney Cut as early as 1848, the first reference to a police officer of the Conservancy Board is from 1871, when William Ross, previously a member of the Marine Police Force, was appointed as "Barge Inspector and Police Officer to the Conservancy". Ross made his presence soon felt, when just a few months into the job he arrested and had prosecuted a bargeman for threatening him with violence whilst he was directing traffic on the river.

In 1900 two officers were employed for the lower end of the river, and by 1908 there were four officers. In 1913 a report from the "Engineer and Manager" stated that the five constables then employed were overworked and would benefit from assistance. He also asked that they be issued with police uniforms and helmets.

During the Second World War police numbers increased, and by 1948 there was a Superintendent, Inspector, Sergeant and eleven constables.

The canal system of Great Britain was nationalised in 1948 and brought under the control of the British Transport Commission. This also saw the various police forces maintained for individual canals and ports merged into the new British Transport Police.

== See also ==
- Law enforcement in the United Kingdom
- List of defunct law enforcement agencies in the United Kingdom
- Canals of the United Kingdom
