= Bute Dock Police =

Former police force in Cardiff, Wales

Bute Dock Police was a small police force responsible for policing Bute Docks, in Cardiff, Wales. The force was formed in 1858 and was merged into the Great Western Railway Police in 1922.

== See also ==
- British Transport Police
- Law enforcement in the United Kingdom
- List of defunct law enforcement agencies in the United Kingdom
