= Liverpool Parks Police =

Police force in Liverpool, England

Liverpool Parks Police was a police force maintained by the Corporation of Liverpool to police the parks and open spaces owned by the city. The first record of "park constables" in Liverpool is from 1832, although members of the force were not sworn in as constables in their own right until 1882. The force was disbanded in 1972.

== History ==
=== 19th century ===
The first police in Liverpool were appointed under the Liverpool Port and Town Improvement Act 1811 (51 Geo. 3. c. cxliii) as "Dock Police Constables". However, the first reference to park constables is from 1832, during the Cholera Riots. On 29 May, the Liverpool Chronicle reported that:

A mob of over 1000 women and young boys of the lower order descended on a hurriedly organised Cholera Hospital in Toxteth Park ... the Park Constables were panic struck and incapable of acting

On 29 February 1836, the "Liverpool Town Borough Police" came into being, having been formed under the Municipal Corporations Act 1835 (5 & 6 Will. 4. c. 76). Liverpool Corporation merged the Corporation Constabulary, Dock Police and the Town Watch into the new police force, though the park and market constables appear to have survived with an independent existence under the control of the town council.

Newsham Park was opened in 1847, at which point "gentleman park leepers" patrolled the parks. Their uniform consisted of a frock coat, velveteen trousers and gaiters, and a stovepipe hat, with a metal band bearing the words "Park Keeper".

In 1855, the borough town council enquired into who was responsible for policing the town's parks. The view of the Head Constable of the Town Police, Captain John Greig, and that of the Watch Committee, was that the Liverpool Improvements Committee was responsible for the maintenance of law and order, and the Town Borough Police did not patrol the parks, only responding to incidents reported by members of the public. The council therefore decided to employ "park keepers" for the parks. The Liverpool Improvement Act 1855 (18 & 19 Vict. c. clv) was passed and in 1856 four "Liverpool Park Keepers" were appointed as such. The park keepers initially wore civilian clothing, though black stovepipe hats were issued shortly after, with a blue band with the words "Park Keeper" in red letters, and a full uniform was issued in the contemporary style.

Section 52 of the Liverpool Improvement and Waterworks Act 1871 (34 & 35 Vict. c. clxxxiv) gave the Improvements Committee the power to appoint regular park keepers and to make park bye-laws for the parks and recreation grounds under their control. Section 113 of the act also permitted the committee to bring prosecutions for breaches of the by-laws. However, the Keepers themselves were not then attested as constables, and did not have police powers, and complaints from members of the public caused the committee to approach the Head Constable of the Liverpool Police and request he appoint all the Liverpool Park Keepers as special constables. He agreed, and the existing Park Keepers were attested as specials that year. A new uniform, similar to the standard contemporary police uniform, was introduced, with a custodian helmet. The new helmet had a helmet plate similar in design to that off the Town Police, but with the words "Park Keeper" for "Liverpool Police".

The Liverpool Improvement Act 1882 (45 & 46 Vict. c. lv) gave the power for the corporation's Improvements Committee to appoint the Park Keepers as constables in their own right, without having to rely on the Liverpool Watch Committee as previously. The keepers were renamed "park constables", and the helmet plate was re-issued with the words "Park Constable". Their powers and privileges as constables extended to all parks under the control of the city council (including those outside the new boundary of the city), and in the next year, the park constables were issued with batons and handcuffs.

In 1891, the strength stood at 1 inspector, 4 sergeants and 60 constables, with salaries from 26 to 30 shillings per week.

=== 20th century ===
==== First half of the century ====
On 15 April 1919, the Head Constable of the City Police, Francis Caldwall, wrote to the Under Secretary of State at the Home Office, saying:

For some time past a considerable number of influential citizens here have been agitating for the policing of the public parks by members of the regular Police Force on account of the disorderly conduct and offences against, decency etc., which it is alleged prevail in the parks. The citizens contend that the residents and persons using the public parks are entitled to the same protection, preservation of peace, good order, and decency there as they are in the public streets...

His letter suggested that the City Police should take over responsibility for policing the parks, but on 15 May the Home Office replied that they considered that "the responsibility of maintenance of order within a public park" rested with the "authority on whom the management of the park is entrusted", which in Liverpool was the Parks and Gardens Committee of the City Council. The headquarters of the Parks Police were located in Newsham Park in 1920, and each park came under the control of an individual Parks Superintendent, with overall responsibility held by Liverpool Corporation Parks Chief Superintendent.

The Liverpool Corporation Act 1921 (11 & 12 Geo. 5. c. lxxiv) was passed, in which section 221 re-enacted the 1882 act by permitting the appointment of "park constables" for the parks. The park police service was extended to all of the recreation grounds and cemeteries of the city, and foot and bicycle patrols were present in the city.

The establishment in 1935 was 4 sergeants and 54 constables, and although no record is made of training, it appears that some training did occur at the City Police training school in Everton Terrace, Liverpool.

By 1942, the force was reduced to just 4 sergeants and 33 constables. In addition, the gates and railings had been removed as part of the war effort, and the Parks Committee had to ask the Watch Committee (responsible for the City Police) for assistance from the City Police for policing the parks. By 1945 the situation had deteriorated further, with just 3 sergeants and 23 constables – under half the strength of 1935.

==== 1947-1972 ====
In 1947 the city council decided to re-structure the force, as a result of which manning levels would be increased substantially, and in 1948 Inspector Charles Dean Gibson of Liverpool City Police was seconded to oversee the efforts. The force adopted new selection criteria based on that of the City Police: 5 feet 8 inches (1.73 m) 5'8" minimum height, under 35 years of age, of "unquestionable character" and both education and fitness tests were introduced. The uniform was also updated, and a helmet in the style of the Metropolitan Police style was brought in. 350 people applied for positions, and on 5 May 1948 30 successful applicants began their Police Induction Training, undertaken by the City Police at the Park Police headquarters, then located in the Mansion House at Calderstones Park. The 30 new constables were posted to their divisional areas in late June, and the existing constables then underwent re-training.

The structure of the force consisted of five areas, covering over 115 parks and cemeteries which comprised 45 square miles (120 km^{2}) throughout the city. The larger parks (Sefton, Stanley, and Newsham Parks) had their own police offices, from which constables were deployed to the smaller parks. Following the reorganisation of 1948, the strength in 1949 stood at 1 inspector, 5 sergeants and 70 constables.

In October 1954, Inspector Gibson (who had until then been seconded) retired from the City Police and was as appointed as member of the Park Police on 15 October. He was sworn in again as a park constable and then appointed "Head Constable" of the Parks Police at the rank of chief inspector. A single Police Chief Officer's cap badge was commissioned by him from a uniform manufacturer in Birmingham. He retired in April 1956, but shortly afterwards was killed when struck by a vehicle while crossing a road in Liverpool. He was replaced by Inspector John Buchanan, who had joined during the 1948 reorganisation, and had been promoted to sergeant in 1951. He had been a member of the Royal Air Force Police as part of his war service, held a law degree and prepared and carried out prosecutions for the force.

A new uniform was issued in 1957, consisting of open collar tunics with blue shirts and black ties, as was now worn by most other police forces in the UK. The custodian helmet was changed from a "ball top" to a "rose" design, and two Vespa scooters were introduced, rising to 12 by 1963. In 1963, officers were issued with a new cap badge similar to that issued to members of the Liverpool Airport Police in 1961.

In 1965, the Park Police introduced police dogs, with a total of three by December 1965. The dogs and their handlers were trained at the City Police Training Centre at Mather Avenue in Liverpool, alongside members of the City Police dog section. The course lasted six weeks, and officers were then deployed for 1 day every fortnight on Home Office-approved continuation training. The number increased to six in 1966, and handlers from the three police forces – the City, Airport and Parks Police – often patrolled together.

In 1967, 5 green-coloured Austin Mini Vans were introduced, with illuminating "POLICE" roof signs, and were later re-painted blue. They were fitted with Pye radio systems. At the same time, personal radios were issued to sergeants and those constables on isolated patrol duties, with a 60-foot mast erected at the control room in the police office at Calderstones Park, which gave radio cover to all parts of the city.

The rise of football hooliganism in the late 1960s and 1970s put great strain on the Parks Police. They had been responsible for policing Stanley Park, the main thoroughfare between Goodison Park (the home of Everton F.C.) and Anfield (the home of Liverpool F.C.) ever since their creation, but increasingly organised violence put greater pressure on both the Parks and City Police on matchdays, when up to 30,000 fans could use the park.

By the late 1970s, John Buchanan had been promoted to superintendent and had taken on joint responsibility for both the Parks Police and the Airport Police. However, the Park Police were coming under pressure and their future role within the organisation of the city council was unclear. Police re-organisations in both 1964 (came into force in 1967) and 1972 (in force in 1974) saw the City Police merged; first with Bootle Borough Police to create Liverpool and Bootle Constabulary, and then with parts of Lancashire Constabulary and Cheshire Constabulary to form Merseyside Police. The rise of international terrorism, by organisations such as the Irish Republican Army, and the commencement of bombings in mainland Britain, also caused airports nationwide to reconsider their policing arrangements.

A working party from the then-Department of Environment, accompanied by a senior officer from the Metropolitan Police, visited the park in 1972 as part of a report which led to the founding of the Royal Parks Constabulary in London in 1974.

=== Disbandment ===
In 1972, both the Parks Police and Airport Police were merged into a new "Liverpool City Council Security Force". The two police forces served their last day on duty on 31 March 1972, and the Security Force commenced operations the next day. The records of the Parks Police were destroyed as part of the merger.

== See also ==
- Law enforcement in the United Kingdom
- List of defunct law enforcement agencies in the United Kingdom
