= Redbridge Parks Police =

Coordinates: 51°33′53″N 0°03′59″E

The London Borough of Redbridge Parks Police Service was a body of constables responsible for policing the parks and open spaces in the London Borough of Redbridge. The service was headed by Chief Officer John Boylin, the former Metropolitan Police Borough Commander for Redbridge. Policing was provided by two shifts, each consisting of one sergeant and six constables. On 31 October 2011, the service was disbanded and replaced by a Council-funded team of Metropolitan Police officers known as the "Redbridge Community Police Team".

== Role ==
The service stated its main responsibilities were to:

- provide a safe environment for all persons visiting or working within the parks and open spaces,
- prevent crime and anti-social behaviour, but where such incidents occur take an appropriate course of action,
- provide a visible and responsive service which helps to reduce the fear of crime and anti social behaviour,
- provide crime prevention advice where appropriate, and
- improve road safety.

== Redbridge Parks Police and the Media ==
Two Redbridge Parks Police officers, Constables Harjit Dhinsa and Graham Jackson, were commended in July 2007 for chasing and arresting two bank robbers outside Barclays Bank in Cranbrook Road, Ilford, on Tuesday 3 July. They were on their way back to base after routine patrol in their 4x4 patrol vehicle when they saw two robbers trying to wrestle a cashbox from a security officer. The officers jumped out of their 4x4 vehicle and pursued the robbers after the security officer had blocked their getaway car with his van. Constable Jackson arrested one of the men after cornering him in a back garden in St Edmund's Road, with the other suspect caught minutes later by officers from Redbridge police. Parks Police (PP) commander, John Boylin was thoroughly impressed and said "The Parks Police have come in for some unfair criticism recently and I hope this incident demonstrates to the public how effectively we work in partnership with the Metropolitan Police."

== See also ==
- Law enforcement in the United Kingdom
- List of defunct law enforcement agencies in the United Kingdom
