= Manchester Market Police =

Police force in Manchester, England

Manchester Market Police was a police force in Manchester, England responsible for policing markets owned by Manchester City Council, the principal market of which was Smithfield Market.

== History ==
There had previously been a police force responsible for policing the Market, from the 1860s to c.1900. In 1962, Manchester Corporation re-formed the force with 20 constables, under Chief Inspector Hargreaves (previously a sergeant with the Manchester City Police), and it started operations on 29 January 1962. The force took anyone arrested to the City Police station at Newton Street (now the Greater Manchester Police Museum). In 1973/4 the market moved to new premises at the New Smithfield Market in Openshaw.

It is unclear whether members of the force were ever attested as constables, but in 1996 they were "peace officers" with powers to enforce the markets bye-laws made under the Manchester Markets Act 1846. They wore a standard police uniform, with green and white sillitoe tartan rather than dark blue or black, and shoulder badges that read "Market Police".

== See also ==
- Law enforcement in the United Kingdom
- List of defunct law enforcement agencies in the United Kingdom
