= Brighton Borough Police =

Defunct police force

Brighton Borough Police was the police force responsible for policing Brighton, Sussex for 129 years from 1838 to 1967, though there were special arrangements in place during the Second World War. It is believed that a police force of sorts was in place in the town by at least 1830 though this largely based on earlier 'watchmen' system of policing. In 1838 the town created its first fully professional police force. At this time the force consisted of a Chief Constable, two Superintendents, a night Constable, three Inspectors and twenty-four Constables.

In 1854 Brighton was incorporated as a municipal borough. In 1854 the force had ten Officers and fifty-one Constables and came under the control of the watch committee of the newly formed Brighton Borough Council. Under the Local Government Act 1888 Brighton became a county borough. By 1902 the force consisted of 102 police officers, policing a population of 123,478.

Between 1943 and 1947, in order to provide a co-ordinated approach to the wartime emergency, Brighton Borough Police was amalgamated with other local forces to form the Sussex Combined Police, with headquarters at Haywards Heath. The combined force was abolished in April 1947, and Brighton Borough Police once again was in place to police the county borough of Brighton. At this time the force consisted of 227 police officers.

Brighton Borough Police was abolished on 1 January 1968, under the Police Act 1964, when its officers became part of newly formed Sussex Constabulary, which later changed its name to Sussex Police. This force continues to police Brighton to the present day.

== See also ==
- Brighton Parks Police
- List of defunct law enforcement agencies in the United Kingdom
