= Isle of Wight Constabulary =

British police force

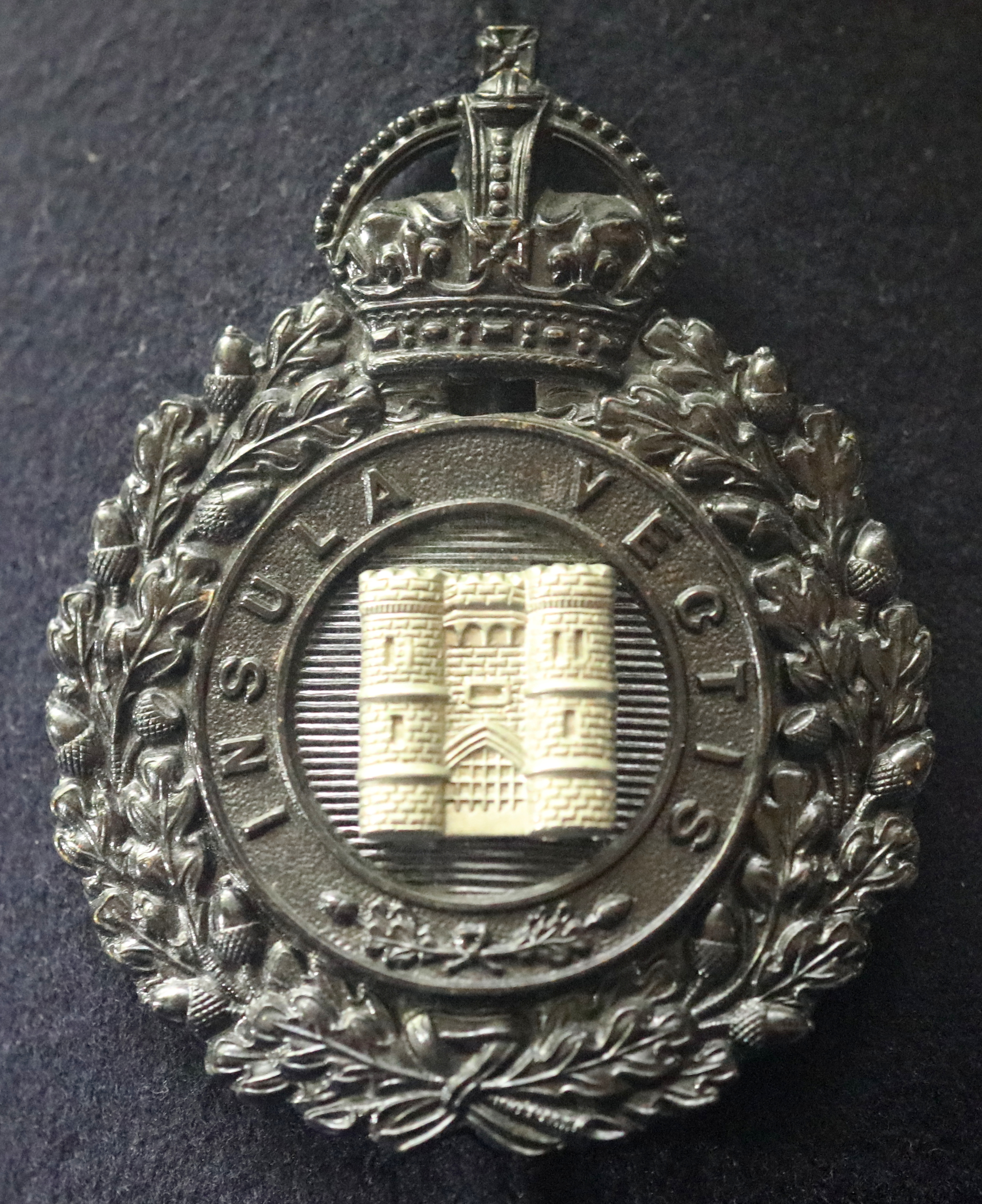
Isle of Wight Constabulary helmet plate

The Isle of Wight Constabulary was a local police force on the Isle of Wight

== History ==
The first separate police force on the island was set up in 1837 with the formation of the Newport Borough Police. The rest of the island was policed by the Hampshire Constabulary with the exception, from 1869, of Ryde, which had a borough force of its own, from 1869 to 1922.

In 1890 the island was granted administrative county status under the Local Government Act 1888. The Newport force area was enlarged and the force renamed to become the Isle of Wight Constabulary. The new force took over the area of the island that the Hampshire Constabulary had been responsible for (all of the island except Ryde and Newport). Many of the Hampshire officers transferred to the new force, the rest returned to the main land.

Ryde Borough Police amalgamated with the Isle of Wight Constabulary in 1922, mainly due to the Police Act 1919. As a result of the Act officers were entitled to better pay and pensions and the borough could not afford this on their own.

In 1943 the Isle of Wight Constabulary was amalgamated with Hampshire Constabulary as a war time measure. At that time there were 79 police officers in the Isle of Wight Constabulary.

With the Police Act 1946 in 1948 the Isle of Wight Constabulary was absorbed into the Hampshire Constabulary to become the Hampshire Joint Police Force, so once again policing of the island was by Hampshire even though the Isle of Wight remained an independent county.

== Chief Officers ==
Retired army Captain Harry George Adams-Connor was Chief Constable from 1899 until 1935. Captain Adams-Connor served in an Irish Regiment called the Connaught Rangers. The Chief Constable at the time of amalgamation with Hampshire in 1943 was Roy Spicer.

== See also ==
- List of defunct law enforcement agencies in the United Kingdom
