= Sutton Parks Constabulary =

Sutton Parks Constabulary was a small, specialised constabulary responsible for policing the parks and open spaces of the London Borough of Sutton. In 2007 the Constabulary was disbanded and responsibility passed to two "Safer Parks Teams" provided by the Metropolitan Police.

Members of the constabulary were sworn as constables under section 18, Ministry of Housing and Local Government Provision Order Confirmation (Greater London Parks and Open Spaces) Act 1967. Such constables have the powers of a constable to deal with by-laws relating to parks and open spaces under their control.

Due to the constabulary's small size, policing was also carried out in the parks of the borough by the Metropolitan Police Service (MPS), and any serious or major incidents or crimes automatically became the responsibility of the MPS.

== See also ==
- Law enforcement in the United Kingdom
- List of law enforcement agencies in the United Kingdom
