= Mid-Wales Constabulary =

Police force in Wales (1948–1968)

Mid-Wales Constabulary was the Home Office police force for the counties of Brecknockshire, Radnorshire and Montgomeryshire, Wales, between 1948 and 1968.

The force was created on 1 April 1948 by the amalgamation of Brecknockshire Constabulary, Radnorshire Constabulary and Montgomeryshire Constabulary under sections 3 and 4 of the Police Act 1946. The Headquarters were in Newtown. The force was abolished in 1968, when it was amalgamated with Carmarthenshire and Cardiganshire Constabulary and Pembrokeshire Constabulary to form Dyfed-Powys Police.

In 1965, the force had an establishment of 225 officers and an actual strength of 220.
