= Liskeard Borough Police =

Agency overview
- Formed: 1853
- Dissolved: 1877

Jurisdictional structure
- Operations jurisdiction: England, UK
- Legal jurisdiction: England & Wales
- Governing body: Police Watch Committee
- Constituting instrument: Municipal Corporations Act 1835
- General nature: Civilian police

Operational structure
- Overseen by: Her Majesty's Inspectorate of Constabulary
- Agency executive: Inspector Humphreys, Chief Constable

Facilities
- Stations: 1

Liskeard Borough Police was the police force for the borough and corporate town of Liskeard, Cornwall, from 1853 to 1877. It was formed in the years following a riot at the Bullers Arms, which necessitated local police. It was amalgamated with Cornwall Constabulary in 1877. It only ever had two officers, Inspector Humphreys and Constable Spry.
