= Greenwich Parks Constabulary =

Greenwich Parks Constabulary was a small police force which policed the parks in the London Borough of Greenwich, England. It was disbanded in 2001.
