= Banbury Borough Police =

Defunct police force

Banbury Borough Police was the police force responsible for policing the borough of Banbury in Oxfordshire, England between 1836 and 1925.

The force was created as a result of the Municipal Corporations Act 1835. By 1864 there were three police officers patrolling the streets whilst one remained in the police station. Several attempts were made to amalgamate Banbury Borough Police with neighbouring forces. A merger with Oxfordshire Constabulary following the Local Government Act 1888 was prevented only by the extension of the borough boundaries. By 1914 the force consisted of a head constable, four sergeants and 11 constables.

The force finally amalgamated with Oxfordshire Constabulary on 1 October 1925 with the two sergeants and 11 constables serving at that time becoming members of the county constabulary.
