= Dyfed-Powys Police =

Welsh territorial police force

Dyfed-Powys Police Heddlu Dyfed-Powys

Agency overview
- Formed: 1968; 58 years ago
- Annual budget: £153.3 million (2025/26)

Jurisdictional structure
- Operations jurisdiction: Ceredigion, Carmarthenshire, Pembrokeshire and Powys unitary authority areas, UK
- Map of Dyfed-Powys Police's jurisdiction
- Area: 4,223 square miles (10,940 km^{2})
- Population: Approx 500,000
- Legal jurisdiction: England & Wales
- Constituting instrument: Police Act 1996
- General nature: Local civilian police

Operational structure
- Overseen by: His Majesty's Inspectorate of Constabulary and Fire & Rescue Services; Independent Office for Police Conduct
- Headquarters: Carmarthen
- Police officers: 1,296 (plus 40 special constables) (2025)
- Police and Crime Commissioner responsible: Dafydd Llewelyn, Plaid Cymru
- Agency executive: Ifan Charles, Chief Constable
- Divisions: 4

Facilities
- Stations: 43 as of 2024

Website
- www.dyfed-powys.police.uk

Dyfed-Powys Police (Welsh: Heddlu Dyfed-Powys; DPP) is the territorial police force for the counties of Carmarthenshire, Ceredigion, Pembrokeshire, and Powys in Wales. As of January 2025, the force had 1,296 police officers, 40 special constables and 801 civilian staff, including police community support officers. The force's headquarters is in Carmarthen.

The Dyfed-Powys region covers an area of 3,360 square miles (8,700 km^{2}), with over 350 miles (560 km) of coastline. Dyfed-Powys is the third largest police force in the United Kingdom by geographic area after Police Scotland and the Police Service of Northern Ireland. It includes many remote rural communities and a number of old industrial areas that are currently undergoing significant change and redevelopment. The population is under 500,000, although it is boosted each year with many tourist visitors.

== History ==
=== Formation and early years (1968–1974) ===
The force was established as Dyfed-Powys Constabulary on 1 April 1968, with the merger of the Carmarthenshire and Cardiganshire Constabulary, the Pembrokeshire Constabulary and the Mid Wales Constabulary. This amalgamation created the largest geographical police force in England and Wales. At its inception, the force comprised 820 officers, including 35 women officers.

=== Name change and first large operations (1974–1980s) ===
In 1974, the force's name changed from Dyfed-Powys Constabulary to Dyfed-Powys Police.

One of the most significant operations in the 1970s was Operation Julie (1977), a major investigation into LSD production and distribution, resulting in the seizure of enough LSD to make 6.5 million tabs, valued at £100 million.

The 1980s saw further major drug operations, including Operation Seal Bay (1983) and Operation Bach (1986), which disrupted drug sales totaling approximately £11 million and led to successful convictions.

=== Advancements and challenges (1980s–2000s) ===
In 1983, the force introduced its first drugs dog, a bilingual Labrador named 'Bowie,' trained to respond to commands in both English and Welsh.

The late 1980s were marked by significant events, including the tragic Scoveston and Dixons murders in Pembrokeshire. Advancements in forensic science years later played a crucial role in solving these cases.

In 1989, Operation Pebble led to the discovery of IRA weapons and explosives in Newgale, resulting in the arrest and sentencing of two suspected IRA members.

The force also expanded its capabilities with the acquisition of a helicopter in 1989, enhancing its operational reach.

=== Modernisation and collaboration (2000s–2010s) ===
The early 2000s saw the introduction of Police Community Support Officers (PCSOs) in 2003, strengthening community policing efforts.

In 2006, Dyfed-Powys hosted Exercise Oystercatcher, a multi-agency exercise testing responses to major terrorist incidents in Wales.

The Force Communication Centre opened in 2006, centralising call-taking functions for police, ambulance, and fire services.

In 2011, John Cooper was convicted for two double murders in Pembrokeshire from the 1980s, following a re-investigation under Operation Ottawa, highlighting the importance of evidence preservation and advancements in forensic science.

The same year, the Welsh Government-funded Strategic Co-ordination Centre was officially opened at Dyfed-Powys HQ, enhancing the force's emergency response capabilities.

In 2012, the Southern Wales collaboration project commenced, with Dyfed-Powys, Gwent, and South Wales Police forces forming a Joint Firearms Unit, pooling resources for increased capability.

=== Recent developments (2015–present) ===
Between 2015 and 2018, the Serious and Organised Crime Team conducted Operations Phobos and Ulysses, targeting drug supply networks. These operations led to 38 defendants being sentenced to over 262 years in prison.

In 2018, Dyfed-Powys Police celebrated its 50th anniversary, reflecting on its history and evolution as a force.

=== Further proposed mergers ===
On 6 February 2006, the Home Secretary Charles Clarke proposed to merge Dyfed-Powys Police with North Wales Police, South Wales Police and Gwent Police, to form one strategic force for all of Wales. Fierce opposition to the proposed changes followed from many quarters during the summer of 2006. John Reid, the new Home Secretary from 5 May 2006, abandoned the proposed restructuring of the police service in England and Wales.

In March 2022, Chief Constable Richard Lewis suggested that the four Welsh police forces should merge within eight years. If it happened, it would make the third-largest police force in England and Wales, with more than 7400 police officers.

In 2026, Home Secretary Shabana Mahmood plans to reduce the number of police forces in England and Wales from the current 43 setup (39 in England, 4 in Wales) to as little as 10-15 forces, with an All-Wales police force being a strong possibility once again.

== Structure ==
=== Local policing ===
Dyfed-Powys Police is divided into four territorial divisions, corresponding to the four counties it serves: Carmarthenshire ('A' Division), Ceredigion ('B' Division), Pembrokeshire ('C' Division), Powys ('D' Division). Each division has:

- response teams (divided in to shifts) that are responsible for general patrol and responding to 999 and non-emergency calls from the public and others
- neighbourhood policing teams that provide single point of contact officers to manage community and quality-of-life issues
- and CID and intelligence teams of detectives that investigate serious and complex cases.
Dyfed-Powys Police Spending 2025/26 split. Total: £181 million.
1. Officer and staff salaries (79.4%)
2. Supplies and services (8.40%)
3. Estates and facilities (3.30%)
4. Transport (1.20%)
5. Officer and staff pensions (1.03%)
6. Other (6.67%)

=== Specialist units ===
Dyfed-Powys Police maintains a number of specialist units to support its policing operations across the region. These include:

- Joint Firearms Unit operated in collaboration with neighbouring forces
- Roads Policing Unit
- Rural Crime Team focusing on agricultural and wildlife offences
- Dog Section
- Marine Unit responsible for policing inland waterways, coastal areas, and supporting search and recovery operations.

Dyfed-Powys Police also contributes to the regional Tarian organised crime and counter terrorism taskforce.

=== Operational support ===
The force is supported by a number of uniformed and non-uniformed departments. These include:

- Force Communications Centre (FCC) - Based at headquarters in Carmarthen, responsible for taking emergency and non-emergency calls and digital contacts; and the deployment and management of resources through despatch and control functions. On an average day the FCC handles in the region of 162 999 calls, 464 non-emergency (101) calls and 250 digital contacts.
- SOCO - Officers who gather forensic evidence from scenes of crime, such as fingerprints, DNA and trace evidence, amongst other areas.

== Notable incidents and investigations ==
=== Murder of April Jones (2012) ===
April Jones was a five-year-old girl from Machynlleth, Wales, whose disappearance on 1 October 2012 led to one of the largest search operations in UK police history. Despite extensive efforts, April's body was never fully recovered; only fragments of her remains were later found in a household fireplace. In May 2013, a man was convicted of her abduction and murder and received a whole life sentence.

=== Llanbrynmair train collision (2024) ===
On 21 October 2024, two trains collided in Llanbrynmair, Powys, resulting in one fatality and 15 injuries. Dyfed-Powys Police managed the emergency response.

=== Claerwen reservoir body discovery (2024) ===
In October 2024, a man's body was found in Claerwen Reservoir, Powys. Despite forensic and international investigations, his identity remains unknown.

== Officers killed in the line of duty ==
The Police Roll of Honour Trust and Police Memorial Trust list and commemorate all British police officers killed in the line of duty. Since its establishment in 1984, the Police Memorial Trust has erected 50 memorials nationally to some of those officers. Since 1950, the following officers of Dyfed-Powys Police are listed by the Remembrance Trust as having been killed in the line of duty:

| Rank | Name | Age | Date | Circumstances |
|---|---|---|---|---|
| Inspector | Gareth Earp | 43 | 29 June 2023 | Road Traffic Collision (RTC) |
| Detective Constable | Barrie Davies | 38 | 11 October 2005 | Road Traffic Collision (RTC) |
| Police Constable | Stephen John | 33 | 3 March 1992 | Road Traffic Collision (RTC) |
| Detective Constable | Paul John Hetherington | 35 | 29 October 1990 | Road Traffic Collision (RTC) |
| Detective Constable | Roger Meyrick | 37 | 18 October 1990 | Road Traffic Collision (RTC) |
| Detective Constable | Leonid Evans | 41 | 18 October 1990 | Road Traffic Collision (RTC) |
| Detective Constable | Nicholas George Tabraham | 29 | 18 October 1990 | Road Traffic Collision (RTC) |
| Sergeant | William Mervyn C. Williams | 36 | 30 July 1979 | Road Traffic Collision (RTC) |
| Police Constable | David Christopher Hinchliff | 19 | 3 June 1979 | Road Traffic Collision (RTC) |
| Police Constable | Hefin John Llewellyn | 22 | 14 August 1971 | Road Traffic Collision (RTC) |
| Police Constable | Thomas Gareth Davies | 23 | 18 June 1971 | Road Traffic Collision (RTC) |

== Chief constables ==
- 1974 J Ronald Jones
- 1975–1986: Richard Thomas
- 1986–1989: David Shattock
- 1989–2000: Ray White
- 2000–2007: Terry Grange
- 2008–2012: Ian Arundale
- 2012: Jackie Roberts (temporary)
- 2013–2016: Simon Prince
- 2016–2021: Mark Collins
- 2021: Claire Parmenter (temporary)
- 2021–2025: Dr Richard Lewis
- 2025: Ifan Charles

=== Controversies ===
In 2007, following a complaint, and during an investigation by the Independent Police Complaints Commission (IPCC) into financial irregularities, Chief Constable Terry Grange retired with immediate effect. Dyfed-Powys Police Authority said it had accepted with regret his retirement with immediate effect, adding that Grange "had indicated that he had allowed his private life to interfere with his professional role. This has led the police authority to consider the chief constable's position and it was considered to be appropriate to accept his retirement." The IPCC continued its investigation after his retirement. In newspapers of 25 November, it emerged that Grange was accused of letting his personal relationship with a judge interfere with the force's handling of child abuse claims against the judge – Grange was the Association of Chief Police Officers (ACPO) spokesperson on child abuse issues.

== See also ==
- Dyfed-Powys Police and Crime Commissioner
- List of law enforcement agencies in the United Kingdom, Crown Dependencies and British Overseas Territories
- Law enforcement in the United Kingdom
