= Liverpool Airport Police =

Defunct police force of the United Kingdom

The Liverpool Airport Police is a defunct police force of the United Kingdom, formerly responsible for policing Liverpool Speke Airport, in Liverpool, England.

== History ==
The Airport Police was formed on 1 April 1961 when control of the Airport passed from the Ministry of Civil Aviation to Liverpool City Council. The existing Ministry of Civil Aviation Constabulary officers were transferred to other Airports still operated by the Ministry. Unlike the City's Parks Police, no provision was made in any of the Liverpool Corporation Acts for the swearing in of constables for the Airport, so they were instead sworn in as special constables of the central Liverpool City Police force.

The force operated a variety of vehicles, including a Vespa scooter, Land Rover, and later a Mini van and BMC J4 patrol car. The vehicles were notable for featuring a dark blue livery with a yellow roof and an amber flashing light rather than the standard blue. The force introduced personal radios in 1967. In 1972, the force consisted of one Superintendent, four sergeants, and 15 constables, of which four were dog handlers.

On 31 March 1972, the force was disbanded (along with the city's Parks Police force) and merged into a new civilian, "Liverpool Corporation Security Force." Individual officers retained their status as special constables. On 1 April 1974, control of the airport passed to the new Merseyside County Council, and the force became the Airport Security Force. The officers lost their status as special constables in 1978.

== See also ==
- Airport policing in the United Kingdom
- Law enforcement in the United Kingdom
- List of defunct law enforcement agencies in the United Kingdom
