= Carmarthenshire and Cardiganshire Constabulary =

Police force in Wales (1958–1968)

Carmarthenshire and Cardiganshire Constabulary was the Home Office police force for the counties of Carmarthenshire and Cardiganshire, Wales.

It was created on 1 July 1958 by the amalgamation of Carmarthenshire Constabulary and Cardiganshire Constabulary under section 4 of the Police Act 1946. In 1968, the force amalgamated with Mid-Wales Constabulary and Pembrokeshire Constabulary to form Dyfed-Powys Police.

In 1965, it had an establishment of 355 and an actual strength of 348.
