= Liverpool and Bootle Constabulary =

Defunct police force

Liverpool and Bootle Constabulary was a short-lived police force in England from 1 April 1967 to 1 April 1974. It was created as a merger of the Liverpool City Police and Bootle Borough Police, and covered the adjacent county boroughs of Liverpool and Bootle. It was amalgamated under the Local Government Act 1972 with parts of the Lancashire Constabulary and Cheshire Constabulary to form Merseyside Police. Its Chief Constable for the entire duration of its existence was Sir James Haughton.

== See also ==
- Law enforcement in the United Kingdom
- List of defunct law enforcement agencies in the United Kingdom
