= All-Wales police force =

Proposed Welsh police force

Proposed Welsh police force

Agency overview
- Formed: Proposed

Jurisdictional structure
- Operations jurisdiction: Wales, United Kingdom
- Map of Proposed Welsh police force's jurisdiction
- Area: 20,737 km^{2} (8,007 sq mi)
- Population: 3,175,181
- Legal jurisdiction: England and Wales
- General nature: Local civilian police

There have been various proposals for an all-Wales police force, a territorial police force that covers all of Wales. Local policing in Wales is currently managed by four police forces: Dyfed-Powys Police, Gwent Police, North Wales Police and South Wales Police.

An all-Wales police force was first proposed in 2005, under the Labour Blair UK government. However concerns over funding, community policing and the speed of the process, led to the proposals not being followed through, with North Wales Police particularly opposing the proposal throughout. Since then, Plaid Cymru and chief constables of some of the police forces, have called for or expressed openness to an all-Wales police force. This is sometimes combined with efforts for policing to be devolved to Wales, while the Conservative UK Government had opposed any reforms.

In December 2025, following the announcement by Labour Home Secretary, Shabana Mahmood that the number of police forces in England and Wales should be reduced, the concept of an all-Wales police force has been re-raised by media, but no formal government proposal has yet been presented.

== Background ==
Map of the four police forces of Wales:
1. North Wales Police
2. Dyfed-Powys Police
3. South Wales Police
4. Gwent Police

Wales is currently divided into four police forces, each overseen by their chief constable and police and crime commissioner:

- Dyfed-Powys Police
- Gwent Police
- North Wales Police
- South Wales Police

Scotland merged its eight police forces in 2013 into Police Scotland. While Northern Ireland has been overseen by one police force, now Police Service of Northern Ireland, which replaced the Royal Ulster Constabulary in 2001.

== History ==
=== 2005–2006 Labour government proposals ===
In September 2005, the Home Office published the "Closing the Gap: Review of the 'Fitness for Purpose' of the Current Structure of Policing in England and Wales" report by Her Majesty's Inspectorate of Constabulary (HMIC). The report stated that there was a "gap" in the provision of Level Two policing, or protective services, throughout England and Wales. To address this, the HMIC recommended that "Strategic Forces" containing between 4,000 and 6,000 officers be created, with the UK government accepting the report's recommendations. Leading to possibly as few as twelve police forces across England and Wales.

Between December 2005 and February 2006, the Welsh Affairs Committee conducted an inquiry analysing the report's impact on Wales, and it resulted in the proposal that Wales' four police forces be merged into one. The committee recognised the proposal may address the "gap" in providing protective services in Wales, but raised questions on the impact it may have on Level 2 services in North Wales, therefore the committee's report could not back the proposal. They also expressed concerns over the timeframe of the proposal, its funding, and the arrangement of governance and accountability. Subsequently, following the committee's publication of the report, the government accepted several of its recommendations, committing to establish a 43-member "Strategic Police Authority for Wales" for the first two years, amend the Police Act 1996 to allow for more than one deputy chief constable, and fund 100% of the net costs of the restructuring, but concerns of the tight timetable, funding of the police force and how it would operate, remain.

In response to the committee's inquiry, on 6 December 2005, three of Wales' chief constables backed the proposal for an all-Wales police force in principle, with only Richard Brunstrom of North Wales Police not yet making a decision. Although the three forces backing it still expressed that they wanted the cost of the restructure to be funded by the government, and remain concerns over the pace of the process and the lack of consultation. The Social Justice Committee of the National Assembly for Wales, was told a restructure may cost between £47 million–£57 million. The government would later accept responsibility for the net costs of the restructure.

==== Options ====
The UK Government stated than an all-Wales force was the only realistic option, with Home Secretary Charles Clarke backing it as the only suitable option, describing the other options as "unsuitable" and it would be better at dealing with organised crime and terrorism. Peter Hain, Welsh Secretary, also backed it stating it would help combat terrorists, highlighting the arrest of a terrorist suspect in South Wales.

The four options were:

- Keep all four police forces as they are
- Four police forces, but North Wales Police has a greater partnership with Cheshire Police
- Merge into two police forces;
  - North Wales and Dyfed-Powys
  - South Wales and Gwent
- All-Wales police force

==== Police forces rejection ====
The police forces had until the 23 December 2005 to submit their preferred mergers. Politicians from all parties criticised the short timetable not allowing for other options to be examined. The Police Federation, which represents rank-and-file officers, expressed concerns that up to 1,000 jobs could be lost. The police forces announced they would miss and did miss the 23 December deadline to support the restructure. They opted instead to submit detailed business cases for other options but not stating which one they preferred.

On 6 February 2006, an all-Wales police force plan was confirmed by Home Secretary Charles Clarke, who stated it was the "only [...] acceptable option". The UK Government had argued that police forces with under 4,000 officers were too small and less effective to address major crime compared to larger forces. North Wales Police, with Ian Roberts North Wales Police Authority chair, as well as Martyn Jones, Clwyd South MP, remained opposed to the plans. Jones claimed most officers would be based south of Brecon, with only 1,500 for the north. If followed through, it was expected to be one of the first mergers in England and Wales, and to be created by April 2007. An all-Wales authority may have consisted of 22 councillors, 14 independents and 7 magistrates.

Wales' four police forces had to agree to a merger by a new deadline 24 February 2006, with Clarke stating if they did not, he would follow through the changes anyway. If North Wales Police rejected it, while the other three agreed, the amalgamation may still have proceeded, giving North Wales Police the chance to join later. Roberts called the plans "a shambles", asked how scrapping North Wales Police can benefit people of North Wales and that the region has different "policing requirements" (a north-south divide) than the rest of the country. Roberts also stated that Prime Minister Tony Blair had pledged that no police merged would be "forced through", and was puzzled over other plans considered for North Wales Police to be merged with Cheshire Police. While Gwent Police chair and vice-president of the Police Superintendents' Association of England and Wales, Ian Johnstone, backed the plans, stating that a merger could lead to local accountability "be[ing] strengthened" if done correctly.

The four forces did not meet the 24 February 2006 deadline, and rejected the merger. They remained concerned over community policing, funding and the speed of the process. The home secretary Charles Clarke was expected to start the legislative process to force the merger on 1 March 2006. A leaked estimate from the Welsh Assembly Government, stated council taxpayers within South Wales Police's area may face a 17% increase.

In March 2006, Roberts claimed the UK Government, through a "Ministry of Spin in Whitehall", was "spreading mis-information" about the benefits of an all-Wales police force, pointing at Home Secretary Charles Clarke and Welsh Secretary Peter Hain. In May 2006, the four forces withdrew from discussions on the idea, over concerns of funding, fearing the budget of one police force would be lower than the existing total funding to all four.

==== 2006 scrapping ====
On 10 July 2006, the merger between Cumbria Police and Lancashire Police was put on hold, after the forces backed out due to insufficient funding for the merger. That merger's difficulty raised whether other mergers could go ahead at all, and it was the only merger in England and Wales that the two forces agreed to do voluntarily. By July 2006, the mergers across England and Wales were scrapped. It was proposed to be reduced to 24 police forces across England and Wales, with South Wales and North Wales each spending around £400,000 in preparation for the merger. Shortly after the cancellation of the merger, North Wales Police announced it would be sending its bill of £375,000 to the Home Office.

=== 2010s other calls ===
In 2013, Scotland's eight police forces were merged, to form Police Scotland, which has been compared to for proposals.

In March 2022, chief constable of Dyfed-Powys Police, Richard Lewis, called for the establishment of a Heddlu Cymru, an all-Wales police force by 2030, arguing it would be more efficient and effective, with only one constable, one deputy constable and one commissioner. The proposed force would have 7,400 officers, and be the third largest in England and Wales, after the Metropolitan Police and West Midlands Police, and learn from the merger that formed Police Scotland. The Home Office responded that the current system allowed for "everyone [to have] a direct say on policing in their area", through their police and crime commissioner. The Welsh Conservatives described the plan as "operational and financial lunacy", and that North Wales Police was more connected with north-west England than the rest of Wales. In April 2022, former North Wales Police and Crime Commissioner, Arfon Jones, responded to the calls, describing the idea of merging Wales' police forces as "naive" as the "criminal threat" for both north and south Wales came from England to the east not in-between, and claimed that funding of it would be centralised to South East Wales. Chief Constable of South Wales Police, Jeremy Vaughan, stated that policing would need to be devolved to Wales first, for an all-Wales police force to work, but agreed that a combined force would be "more efficient".

In December 2022, Plaid Cymru called for the creation of an all-Wales police force following allegations of misogyny, racism and homophobia within Gwent Police. Adam Price, the party's leader, stated such a merger would improve trust in policing. In November 2023, Wales' four police and crime commissioners claimed that a single police force may not necessarily benefit Wales. They mentioned the existing police forces' history of collaboration with each other, local connectivity, that such police force may be "too big", and that an all-Wales police force may pull resources away from rural areas towards urban ones.

=== 2026 possible development ===
In July 2025, various police chiefs across England and Wales have argued that the number of police forces be reduced.

In January 2026, UK Government Home Secretary, Shabana Mahmood announced plans to reduce the number of police forces in England and Wales. There are 43 in total across England and Wales, with Wales specifically having four. The announcement raised the possibility the idea of an all-Wales police force is back on the table. Plaid Cymru MS, Adam Price, stated such proposals should be fully scrutinised by the Senedd, Wales' parliament, and have "a Welsh democratic mandate". Price stated such merger may have benefits but its governance would be critical, arguing that policing should be devolved to Wales. If any changes go ahead, they are planned to take effect by the end of the next parliamentary term, around 2034.

In February 2026, Gwent Police Chief Constable Mark Hobrough voiced concerns that smaller police forces would be taken over by larger neighbouring police forces. Hobrough stated his intentions to maintain the service Gwent Police has provided to residents and keep the identity of Gwent Police and the connection has to communities.
