= Truro City Police =

Historic police force in England

Truro Borough Police, circa 1870

Truro City Police, known as Truro Borough Police until 1877, was the police force for the corporate town of Truro, Cornwall, from 1836 to 1921. It was established under the terms of the Municipal Corporations Act 1835 which required every town to appoint a council (also referred to as a corporation) and a Police Watch Committee, which was responsible for overseeing a police force.

== Formation and early history ==
One of the first constables is recorded as James Fitzsimmons, a former Irish labourer from Omagh, County Tyrone. Under collar number 2 he served the new force for thirteen years, eventually transferring to the Helston Borough Police. Fitzsimmons was said to have suffered from a significant back injury sustained in a fall from a horse, and also suffered from epilepsy. Fitzsimmons' son Robert, became a champion boxer, and is the subject of the book "Lanky Bob" by author K.R. Robinson. The chief officer was invariably referred to as the Chief Constable, High Constable and Head Constable, although in actuality held the rank of Inspector, and later, Superintendent.

From the outset the strength of the force was fourteen men, including the Head Constable George Payne. Other officers of the new force documented in official records include Constables John Rapsey, John Lowry, George Hall, Thomas Walley, William Couch, Benjamin Bawden and George Roberts. Early in the force's history the number of officers was thought to have been too high. At a meeting of the Truro Borough Council in March 1837, representatives attempted to reduce the number of officers from fourteen to seven, and by balloting the movement was rejected. A revised suggestion would see the force reduced to nine men, also balloted and rejected. A final attempt to reduce the force to seven was also rejected, with the meeting adjourned without coming to an agreement.

In 1846 the police took up residence at the newly constructed Town Hall on the corner of St Nicholas Street and King Street, sharing the building with the magistrates, stannary courts and the fire brigade. Petty and Quarter Sessions were held at the building, with the Chief Constable responsible for presenting cases to the courts.

By the 1850s the Truro Borough Council had its way and had reduced the number of serving officers by less than half the original strength. Subsequently the force was consistently criticised in successive inspections by the Inspector of Constabulary, with the earliest recorded report in 1858. The report recommended the addition of four extra officers to serve a population of 10,733 and a 1,103-acre beat. The corporation rejected the recommendation, however, when they pointed out that given the town was largely pastoral land there was no requirement to fund extra police officers, and that the Inspector of Constabulary was "sorely mistaken" in his estimations.

On 23 September 1873 the force was inspected by the Inspector of Constabulary Captain Willis, who examined the force's uniforms, books, cells and expressed himself "much satisfied," although would again point out that force was understaffed, and would be eligible for a government grant. In April 1874 the corporation of Truro was informed that the government would be subsidising approximately fifty per cent of the police force's budget. Previously the population of the town had funded the police in entirety via the local police rate, and in response to the new funding the corporation recommended an increase in manpower. In May 1876, the strength of the Truro Borough Police force was once again criticised for being "inefficient" owing to only six officers serving a population of 11,000. The government recommended a minimum of twelve for the borough, which by 1878 was achieved.

== Chief constables ==
The first Chief Constable was George Payne, appointed in 1836. Payne is notable for collaborating with a Mr Davis, then station-master for Newham Railway Station, in inventing a type of smokeless gunpowder. Work on the powder was abandoned however when detractors spoke out about the product permitting game to be "killed by poachers with impunity." On 12 August 1882, Payne, who was by this time retired from the police and working at Newham Railway Station as a nightwatchman, was brutally assaulted by a male known as "Doctor Dick." Doctor Dick was later apprehended in Cardiff and sentenced to ten years in prison. Upon Payne's retirement the force was led by William John Nash, and later William Woolcock from 1865 to 1872. In 1873 Richard Angel was sworn in as the new Chief Constable and led the force for 21 years, retiring in 1894. His service is notable for the low crime rate observed under his leadership, with no cases of murder or manslaughter recorded in two decades. Moreover, he would oversee the closure of a number of undesirable public houses in Truro. Angel would also increase the number of regular officers from six in 1873 to twelve in 1878. Angel was succeeded by former Oldham Borough Police officer Inspector Edwin F. Winch who served until 1897. On his departure Angel was awarded a gift by Winch of an ornamental metal water jug bearing the inscription "presented to Chief Superintendent Angel by the members of the Truro City Police Force, on retiring on superannuation, 1894, as a mark of their regard and best wishes for his future welfare." Winch was succeeded by a Mr Coleman, who resigned in 1901 to lead the Lincolnshire Constabulary, with Truro City Police Sergeant Frank Pearce taking the post of Chief Constable until 1920.

Chief Constables of the era also held the role of Inspectors of Weights & Measures, which was true for Woolcock, Angel, Winch and Pearce, with some civilian members of the corporation taking on the role invariably or concurrently with the Chief Constable.

== Special Constabulary ==
To support the regular police during the First World War, a large number of Special Constables were employed. In February 1915, approximately fifty-seven members of the community, including members of the clergy, attended the Town Hall and were sworn in by the Mayor Mr J.J. Smith.

== Rebranding ==
In 1877 the borough of Truro was granted city status by Queen Victoria, and the police force was accordingly renamed Truro City Police. The change also prompted the force to adopt a new style of uniform, which included the wearing of Metropolitan Police-styled duty armbands, and the use of the rank of Chief Constable for the chief officer. Sergeant uniforms would also feature the traditional chevrons on the upper arm as opposed to the cuff as before, and would wear chrome cap badges in comparison to the black worn by Constables. The force was known for its uniform peculiarities, such as the fixing of the whistle chain to the right breast pocket instead of the left.

== First World War ==
A small group of regular police officers resigned their posts in 1914 and went to war, and it is unknown whether any were killed in action. They were constables Balment, Benney, Lindesay and Moon. In 1920 an unidentified former officer of the force was criticised by Councillor J. Tonkin for requesting preferential treatment from the Mayor and Chief Constable. It was alleged that this former officer attempted to secure his job with the police, and an immediate promotion to Sergeant, through insidious means, and entirely expected his job to remain open to him on his return. Had he been granted re-employment with the police, it would have meant the supersession of another Sergeant who had reached the rank through normal means.

== Abolition ==
In March 1921 the force amalgamated with the Cornwall Constabulary. Resistance to the merger was reported in the media, with the main reason being "sentiment," however it was also noted that amalgamation would save "4d in the £ to the rates." Prior to the merger, Chief Constable Pearce retired due to ill health leaving the post vacant.
