= Newham Community Constabulary =

Newham Community Constabulary, formerly called Newham Parks Constabulary, was a very small non-Home Office constabulary responsible for patrolling the 52 parks and open spaces covering 1.63 square miles in the London Borough of Newham.

Newham Parks Constabulary was established in 1998, with thirteen constables headed by a Senior Parks Constable. In 2001, following the departure of the Senior Constable, the new grade of Sergeant was created and three constables promoted to it. In 2004 the service was reformed by the Newham Council, headed by Sir Robin Wales in the newly created office of directly elected mayor. The service was renamed the Newham Community Constabulary and an Inspector was appointed to head the service. In July 2009 the Constabulary was disbanded.

The service had forty employees: one Inspector, six Sergeants, and thirty three Constables. Members of the constabulary were sworn as constables under section 18, Ministry of Housing and Local Government Provision Order Confirmation (Greater London Parks and Open Spaces) Act 1967. This gave the constables the powers and privileges of a constable to enforce by-laws in relation to parks and open spaces under their control. They had no constabulary powers to enforce criminal law and should not have been be mistaken for police officers. Once they left the clearly identified parks areas, they had no legal powers to enforce by-laws, indeed an official report into their activities concluded that "Even in the parks they cannot arrest for offences under other legislation such as the Theft Act or the Criminal Damage Act – other than as a private citizen."

Any serious incidents and crimes in the parks were dealt with by the Metropolitan Police Service.

Following a number of allegations into corruption, racism and abuse of non-existent police powers the constabulary was subject to an investigation. An official report identified that the use of titles such as sergeant and constable was misleading as members of the service are council workers rather than police officers and it has been recommended that those titles are changed to reflect their actual status and powers. An official report concluded that those responsible for Parks Constables need to be careful that their staff do not describe themselves as police or that any uniform they wear is not so similar to that of the Police to cause confusion in the minds of the public. This comment was echoed by Liberty, who felt that the use of police forms by those council employees might cause members of the public to confuse them with police officers.
