= Somerset and Bath Constabulary =

Defunct police force

Somerset and Bath Constabulary was a short-lived police force in England which existed from 1967 to 1974. It was responsible for policing the administrative county of Somerset and the county borough of Bath.

The force was formed following the amalgamation of Somerset Constabulary and Bath City Police on 1 January 1967. The amalgamation came as a result of the Police Act 1964, which significantly reduced the number of individual police forces in England and Wales. The Act did give the Home Secretary power to mandate amalgamations, however both preceding forces agreed to a voluntary amalgamation. At the time of formation the force had 912 officers and was responsible for policing a population of 644,460.

The force was abolished just over 7 years later on 31 March 1974 as a result of the Local Government Act 1972. The force merged with Bristol City Police and parts of the Gloucestershire Constabulary to form Avon and Somerset Constabulary, which polices the area to this day.
