= Cornwall County Constabulary =

Home Office police force in England

Cornwall County Constabulary was the Home Office police force for the county of Cornwall, England, until 1967.

The force was formed in 1857. It absorbed Bodmin Borough Police in 1866, Liskeard Borough Police in 1877, Launceston Borough Police in 1883, Falmouth Borough Police, Helston Borough Police, Penryn Borough Police and St Ives Borough Police in 1889, Truro City Police in 1921, and Penzance Borough Police and the Isles of Scilly Police in 1947. From 1947 it was officially called the Cornwall and Isles of Scilly Constabulary, although this name was rarely used. In 1965, it had an establishment of 500 and an actual strength of 446.

On 1 April 1967 it amalgamated with Devon and Exeter Police and Plymouth City Police to form Devon and Cornwall Constabulary.

The archives and objects that relate to the force are now held by the Museum of Policing in Devon and Cornwall.

== Chief Constables ==
- 1857–1896 : Colonel Walter Raleigh Gilbert
- 1896–1909 : Richard Middleton Hill
- 1909–1935 : Lieutenant-Colonel Hugh Bateman Protheroe-Smith, OBE
- 1935–1956 : Major Edgar Hare
- 1956-1964 : Richard Bonar Matthews
- 1964-1967 : Kenneth Mortimer Wherly
