= St Ives Borough Police =

St Ives Borough Police was the borough police force for the town of St Ives, Cornwall, from 1836 to 1889. It was established following the passage of the Municipal Corporations Act 1835. The force was unique in that it only boasted a single constable at any one time throughout its entire existence.

== Background ==
Like many other towns in the early 19th-century, law and order in St Ives was administered by a parish constable appointed by a justice of the peace. With the passage of the Municipal Corporations Act 1835, St Ives was made a borough with an elected council, which consisted of a mayor, four aldermen, and twelve councilors. Part of the commonality of the town's government was a watch committee responsible for establishing a police force, also referred to as a "commission of the peace." The role of parish constable was abolished in favor of a head constable.

== Strength ==
St Ives Borough Police only had a single officer at any one time, and was severely criticised by the Inspector of Constabulary in his 1876 report for being "too small and inefficient to be worthy of keeping." A further report, following an inspection on 20 May 1878, found that more police were needed for such a large area and population. The head constable was based at the Market Hall, and made use of the town hall, which had two police cells, for bringing offenders into custody. By 1889 the pressure to merge with the Cornwall County Constabulary was such that amalgamation became a certainty. The lone officer of the borough was known as the head constable and wore a frock coat and top hat. In 1873 the position was held by James Bennett, who also held the title of Collector of Market Tolls.
