= Haringey Parks Constabulary =

Haringey Parks Constabulary was a small constabulary that patrolled parks and open spaces of the London Borough of Haringey to enforce by-laws and parks regulations.

Members of the constabulary were sworn as constables under section 18, Ministry of Housing and Local Government Provision Order Confirmation (Greater London Parks and Open Spaces) Act 1967. Such constables had the powers of a constable to deal with by-laws relating to parks and open spaces under their control.

The constabulary was abolished in April 2009.

== See also ==
- Law enforcement in the United Kingdom
- List of law enforcement agencies in the United Kingdom
