= Newport Borough Police (Monmouthshire) =

Police force in Wales (1836–1967)

The Newport Borough Police was the police force for the borough of Newport, Monmouthshire between 1836 and 1967.

In 1830 four watchmen were appointed to patrol the streets of Newport for the purpose of maintaining law and order. They also served to protect the people and their property.

By 1834 Newport had its first Chief Constable. Sergeant John Redman of the Metropolitan Police Force appeared at a meeting of the Improvement Committee and was duly elected Chief Constable and Prison Bailiff, but it was not until 1836 that the Watch Committee appointed its first regular police force. The first police station was located at the rear of the Parrot Hotel in Commercial Street.

Under the control of Chief Constable John Redman, two divisions were created. The 'town' division had a force of eight men and Pillgwenlly division six men, all of whom were unpaid, with the exception of a Pill shoemaker, Rees Rees, who received £25 per annum for executing warrants, serving summonses and carrying out his general police duties.

The force was abolished in 1967, when it was amalgamated with the Monmouthshire Constabulary to form Gwent Police.
