= Birmingham Market Police =

English police force (1883–1976)

Birmingham Market Police is a defunct police force of the United Kingdom which existed between 1883 and 1976, and was formerly under the control of Birmingham Corporation where it was responsible for policing the markets controlled by the corporation. Constables of the market police were attested under section 104 of the Birmingham Corporation (Consolidation) Act 1883 (46 & 47 Vict. c. lxx) which gave them the same powers and privileges as borough constables appointed under the Municipal Corporations Act 1882, but the part of the 1882 act that related to borough constables had been completely repealed by 1976 and therefore such constables no longer enjoy any powers.

In 2016 Birmingham City Council introduced "market enforcement officers", who are "accredited persons" under a Community Safety Accreditation Scheme, giving them the power to issue fixed penalty notices for a variety of low-level offences.

== See also ==
- Law enforcement in the United Kingdom
- List of defunct law enforcement agencies in the United Kingdom
