= Bath City Police =

Defunct police force

The Bath City Police was a police force responsible for policing the County Borough of Bath in Somerset, England. It existed between 1836 and 1967. The Bath City Police, as an organization, was formed as a result of Municipal Corporations Act 1835, though it did not begin commencing duties until 15 February 1836. By 1852 the force had a strength of 86 police officers.

The force was then merged with the Somerset Constabulary in 1967 and formed the short-lived constabulary of Somerset and Bath. This constabulary, in turn, was amalgamated into the Avon and Somerset Constabulary in 1974, which polices the area to this day and employs over 3000 officers.

== Background ==
The British City of Bath, has existed in one form or another since the first century, though human occupation in the area has a much longer history. At the start of the nineteenth century, 40,020 people were recorded to be living in Bath making it one of the largest cities in Britain. The Municipal Corporations Act 1835 (5 & 6 Will. 4. c. 76), sometimes known as the Municipal Reform Act, was an Act of the Parliament of the United Kingdom that reformed local government in the incorporated boroughs of England and Wales. This reformation was especially significant for Bath, since four of its districts were under control of four separate police forces (while another portion of the city had no police force) until the Municipal Corporations Act centralized policing authority with the city government, rather than Improvement commissioners, in each district.
