= Monmouthshire Constabulary =

Police force in Wales (1857–1967)

Monmouthshire Constabulary was the Home Office police force for the county of Monmouthshire (excluding the county borough of Newport), United Kingdom until 1967.

The force was established in 1857. In 1967 it amalgamated with Newport Borough Police to form Gwent Police.

In 1965, the force had an establishment of 465 officers and also an actual strength of 465, making it the only force in England and Wales that was up to strength.
