= Bristol Constabulary =

Former police force in England

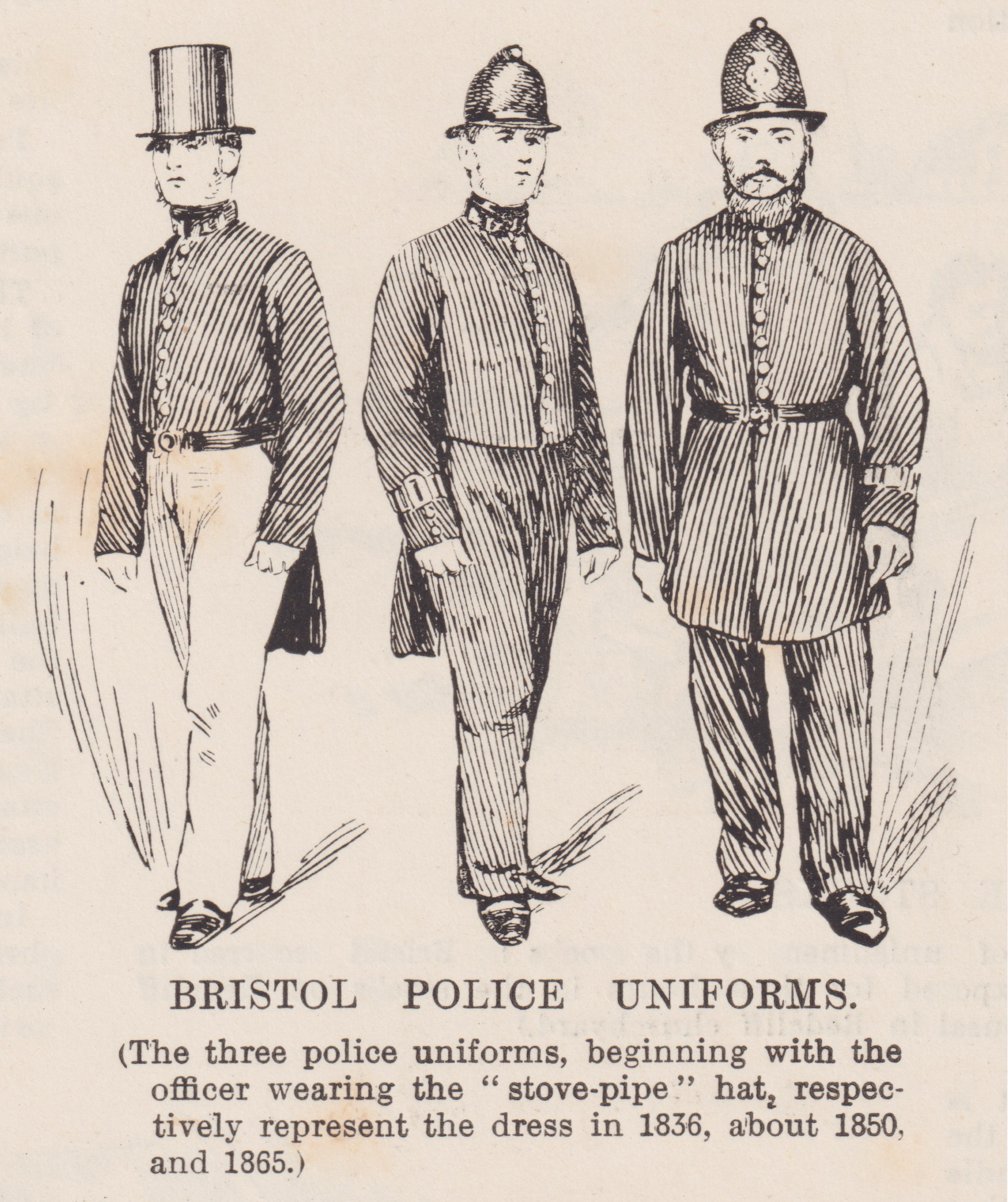
Bristol Police uniforms in the 19th century

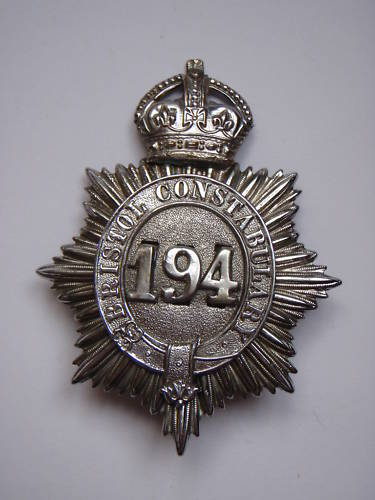
Cap badge of the Bristol Constabulary

Bristol Constabulary, also called Bristol City Police, was a police force responsible for policing the city of Bristol in south-west England from its foundation in 1835 until 1974, when it was amalgamated under the Local Government Act 1972 with Somerset and Bath Constabulary and parts of the Gloucestershire Constabulary to form the Avon and Somerset Constabulary.

At the time of its formation, Bristol Constabulary had an establishment of 232 officers, and was led by Superintendent Joseph Bishop, who had been appointed from the Metropolitan Police. The main police station was at the Guard House in Wine Street, Clifton's station was at Brandon Hill, St Phillips and St Jacobs at Trinity Road, and Bedminster's at Turnpike Road. Only the Guard House was initially ready, and temporary premises were used until the other stations were complete. In addition to the superintendent, each station had one inspector and six sergeants. The "City" station (Guard House) had 67 constables, Clifton 53, St Phillips and St Jacobs 40, and Bedminster 38.

The first recruits came from a range of other occupations, including 53 labourers, 19 "servants", 10 shoemakers, 9 farmers, several soapboilers, brewers, ropemakers, cordwinders and butchers, one "gentleman" and one jeweller.

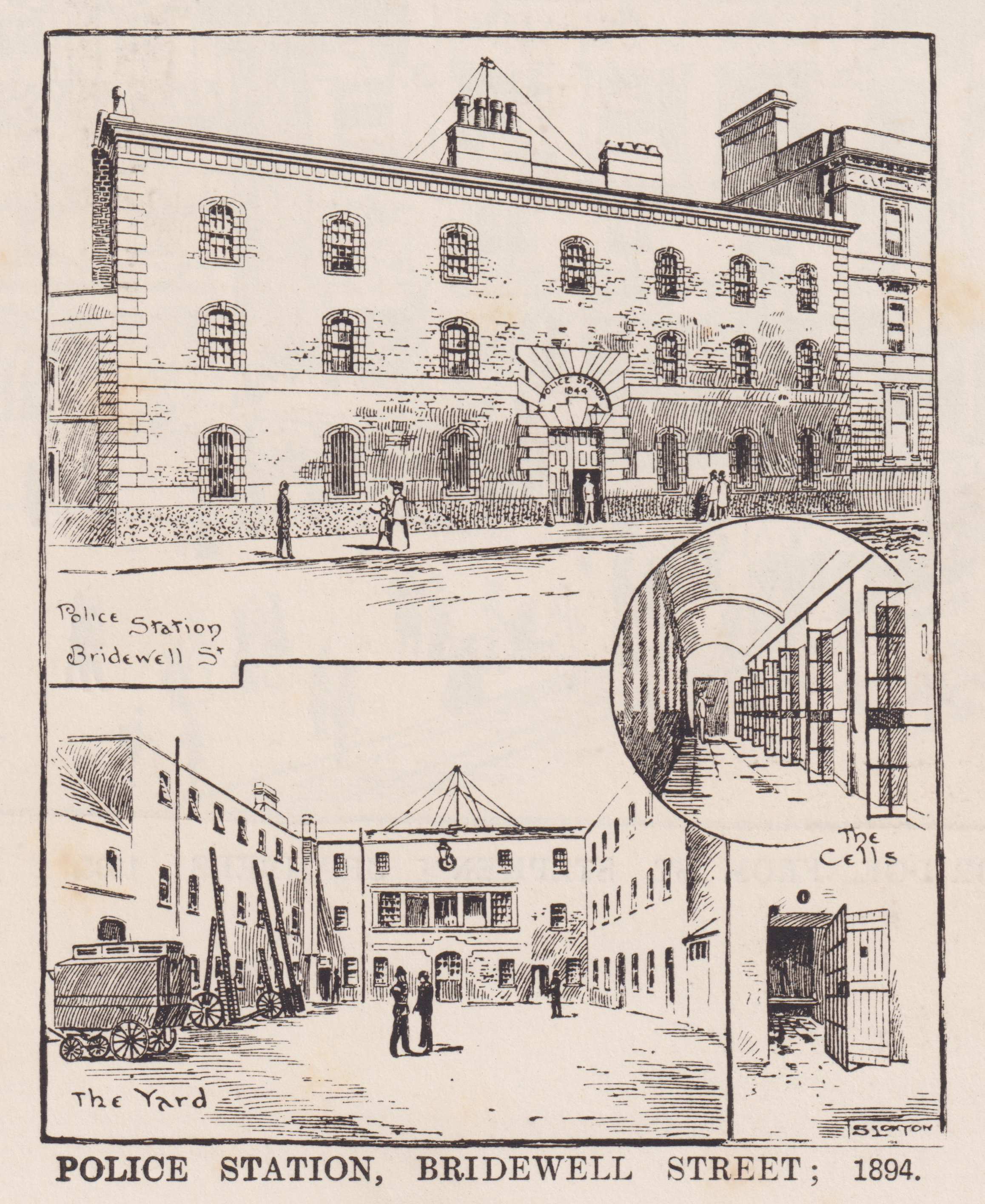
Central Police Station, 1894

The Constabulary took up its duties on 25 June 1836. In 1842 the Guard House was condemned and a new Central Station was built on Bridewell Street.

Unlike most city forces, the force was officially a constabulary, the usual name given to county forces, since Bristol was a county as well as a city.

Policing for ordinary constables in the late Victorian period was centred almost entirely on patrolling their 'beat' on foot, typically covering 20 miles per day. Officers were given beat cards which specified exactly where they should be at each time of the day. The idea was that anyone wanting assistance would know when an officer would be there. The disadvantage was that criminals would know this too. The pay and holiday entitlement in Bristol in the late nineteenth century were regarded as poor, with no pension offered. Dismissals for drunkenness were common.

By 1866 the force had grown to 296 officers, and by 1945 to 814. At the time of its amalgamation into the Avon and Somerset Constabulary on 1 April 1974, the force had 1247 officers.

== Archives ==
Records of the Bristol Constabulary and Avon and Somerset Constabulary are held at Bristol Archives (Ref. Pol) (online catalogue).
