= Police Act 1946 =

Act of the Parliament of the United Kingdom

Police Act 1946 (Note: Section 20(1).)
- Act of Parliament
- Parliament of the United Kingdom
- Long title: An Act to abolish non-county boroughs as separate police areas; to provide for the amalgamation of county and county borough police areas; to provide for the purchase of land for police purposes by compulsory purchase order; to redefine the Metropolitan Police District; and for purposes connected with the matters aforesaid.
- Citation: 9 & 10 Geo. 6. c. 46
- Territorial extent: England and Wales (Note: Except the repeal of section 11 of the Police (Scotland) Act 1857 (20 & 21 Vict. c. 72). Section 20(2)–(3).)

Dates
- Royal assent: 15 April 1946
- Commencement: 1 April 1947 (Note: Section 20(4).)
- Repealed: 1 June 1965 (Note: The Police Act 1964 (Commencement No. 1) Order 1964 (SI 1964/873).)
Other legislation
Amends	Metropolitan Police Act 1829; Metropolitan Police Act 1839; Police (Scotland) Act 1857; Metropolitan Police Act 1886
Amended by	Police (Scotland) Act 1956; Charities Act 1960
Repealed by	Police Act 1964
Relates to	Police (Scotland) Act 1946

Status: Repealed

Text of statute as originally enacted

The Police Act 1946 (9 & 10 Geo. 6. c. 46) was an act of the Parliament of the United Kingdom that provided for the amalgamation of smaller borough police forces with county constabularies in England and Wales, allowed for the merger of county forces in certain circumstances, and changed the boundaries of the Metropolitan Police District.

The Police (Scotland) Act 1946 (9 & 10 Geo. 6. c. 71) made similar provisions for Scotland.

The appointed day for the amalgamations was 1 April 1947. On that date forty-five non-county borough police forces were merged with those of the counties in which they were situated. In the case of fourteen of these boroughs, they had already been temporarily placed under the county police by the Defence (Amalgamation of Police Forces) Regulations 1942. Section 13 of the 1946 Act made these amalgamations permanent. One non-county borough force, Cambridge City Police, was allowed to continue, the city having a larger population than the surrounding county. The Act made similar provision for Peterborough City Police, although in the event it formed a combined force with the Soke of Peterborough.

Following the 1947 mergers there were 133 police forces covering England and Wales:

- Metropolitan Police
- City of London Police
- 55 county police forces (Note: The actual number was 53, as the Lincolnshire Constabulary was jointly maintained by three counties.)
- 71 county borough police forces
- 1 non-county borough force (Cambridge)
- 4 combined police forces

Section 3 of the act allowed for the voluntary amalgamation of county and county borough forces, while Section 4 gave the Home Secretary the power to make amalgamation schemes of constabularies.

Section 16 provided for the "rectification" of the Metropolitan Police District, realigning it with contemporary local government boundaries.

Section 18 placed the Isles of Scilly under the Cornwall County Constabulary

== 1947 amalgamations ==
- Bedfordshire Constabulary absorbed Bedford Borough Police, Luton Borough Police
- Berkshire Constabulary absorbed Windsor Borough Police
- Buckinghamshire Constabulary absorbed Chepping Wycombe Borough Police
- Carmarthenshire Constabulary absorbed Carmarthen Borough Police
- Cheshire Constabulary absorbed Chester City Police, Congleton Borough Police, Hyde Borough Police, Macclesfield Borough Police, Stalybridge Borough Police
- Cornwall and Isles of Scilly Constabulary formed by the merger of the Cornwall County Constabulary, Isles of Scilly Police and Penzance Borough Police
- Cumberland and Westmorland Constabulary absorbed Kendal Borough Police
- Derbyshire Constabulary absorbed Chesterfield Borough Police, Glossop Borough Police
- Durham Constabulary absorbed Hartlepool Borough Police
- Essex Constabulary absorbed Colchester Borough Police
- Glamorgan Constabulary absorbed Neath Borough Police
- Herefordshire Constabulary absorbed Hereford City Police
- Hertfordshire Constabulary absorbed St Albans City Police
- Kent Constabulary absorbed Canterbury City Police
- Lancashire Constabulary absorbed Accrington Borough Police, Ashton-under-Lyne Borough Police, Bacup Borough Police, Clitheroe Borough Police, Lancaster City Police
- Lincolnshire Constabulary absorbed Boston Borough Police, Grantham Borough Police
- Norfolk Constabulary absorbed King's Lynn Borough Police
- North Riding of Yorkshire Constabulary absorbed Scarborough Borough Police
- Nottinghamshire Constabulary absorbed Newark Borough Police
- Peterborough Combined Police formed from Peterborough City Police, Liberty of Peterborough Constabulary
- Shropshire Constabulary absorbed Shrewsbury Borough Police
- Staffordshire Constabulary absorbed Newcastle-under-Lyme Police
- Warwickshire Constabulary absorbed Leamington Spa Borough Police
- Worcestershire Constabulary absorbed Kidderminster Borough Police

== Later amalgamations ==
The Home Secretary's powers under Section 4 of the Act were used on a number of occasions:

- Hampshire Constabulary was formed in 1948 by a merger of Hampshire County Constabulary and Isle of Wight County Constabulary. This made permanent the 1943 merger of the two constabularies (as Hampshire Joint Police) under the 1942 Defence Regulations.
- Mid Wales Constabulary was formed on 1 April 1948 from Breconshire Constabulary, Radnorshire Constabulary and Montgomeryshire Constabulary
- Gwynedd Constabulary was formed in 1950 from Anglesey Constabulary, Caernarvonshire Constabulary and Merionethshire Constabulary
- Leicestershire and Rutland Constabulary was formed on 1 April 1951 from Leicestershire Constabulary, Rutland Constabulary
- Carmarthenshire and Cardiganshire Constabulary was formed on 1 July 1958 by the merger of Cardiganshire Constabulary and Carmarthenshire Constabulary. The amalgamation followed the unfavourable conclusions of an inquiry into the Cardiganshire force.

== Subsequent developments ==
The whole act was repealed by section 64(3) of, and part I of the schedule 10 to, the Police Act 1964, which came into force on 1 June 1965.
