= Henley Borough Police =

- Common name: Henley Borough Police

Agency overview
- Formed: 1836
- Dissolved: 1856
- Superseding agency: Oxfordshire Constabulary

Jurisdictional structure
- Operations jurisdiction: Oxfordshire, England, United Kingdom
- Legal jurisdiction: Borough of Henley

Operational structure
- Headquarters: Henley-on-Thames

Henley Borough Police was the police force responsible for policing the borough of Henley in Oxfordshire, England until 1856.

It had been established in 1836 as a result of the Municipal Corporations Act 1835. Henley Borough Police was amalgamated into the newly formed Oxfordshire Constabulary as a result of the County and Borough Police Act 1856.

Henley is today policed by the successor to Oxfordshire Constabulary, Thames Valley Police.

== See also ==
- List of defunct law enforcement agencies in the United Kingdom
