= Windsor Borough Police =

Agency overview
- Formed: 1836
- Dissolved: 1 February 1947
- Superseding agency: Berkshire Constabulary

Jurisdictional structure
- Operations jurisdiction: UK
- Legal jurisdiction: Borough of Windsor
- Constituting instrument: Municipal Corporations Act 1835
- General nature: Local civilian police

Operational structure
- Headquarters: Windsor, Berkshire

Windsor Borough Police was the police force responsible for policing the borough of Windsor in Berkshire, England until 1947.

It had been established in 1836 as a result of the Municipal Corporations Act 1835. Windsor Borough Police was amalgamated into Berkshire Constabulary on 1 February 1947 due to the Police Act 1946. The responsibility for policing Windsor Castle was, and still is that of the Metropolitan Police.

Windsor is today policed by the successor to Berkshire Constabulary, Thames Valley Police.

== See also ==
- List of defunct law enforcement agencies in the United Kingdom
