= Anglesey Constabulary =

Police force in Wales (1856–1950)

Agency overview
- Formed: 1856
- Dissolved: 1 October 1950

Jurisdictional structure
- Operations jurisdiction: Anglesey, Wales, United Kingdom
- General nature: Civilian police

Anglesey Constabulary was the Home Office police force for the county of Anglesey, Wales from 1856 until 1950.

== History ==
The Constabulary was formed in 1856, under the County and Borough Police Act 1856, to replace the existing parish constables responsible for enforcing the law in local areas. The Chief Constable's Office was located in Llangefni.

Under the Police Act 1946, it amalgamated with Caernarvonshire Constabulary and Merionethshire Constabulary to form the Gwynedd Constabulary in 1950, which was renamed North Wales Police in 1974. The Constabulary's archives are held at Anglesey Archives.

== Chief Constables ==
- 1894–1918 Lewis Thomas Prothero
- 1919–49 Robert Humphrey Prothero

== See also ==
- North Wales Police
