= Wallingford Borough Police =

Agency overview
- Formed: 1836
- Dissolved: September 8, 1856
- Superseding agency: Berkshire Constabulary
- Employees: 3 (at dissolution)

Jurisdictional structure
- Operations jurisdiction: UK
- Legal jurisdiction: Wallingford, Berkshire, England
- Governing body: Wallingford Borough Council
- Constituting instrument: Municipal Corporations Act 1835
- General nature: Local civilian police

Operational structure
- Headquarters: Wallingford
- Constables: 3 (at dissolution)

Wallingford Borough Police was the police force responsible for policing the borough of Wallingford in Berkshire, England until 1856.

It had been established in 1836 as a result of the Municipal Corporations Act 1835. Wallingford Borough Police was amalgamated into Berkshire Constabulary on 8 September 1856, when the borough authorities voluntarily agreed to let Berkshire Constabulary police the borough. The three serving constables of the borough force at that time were discharged.

Wallingford is today policed by the successor to Berkshire Constabulary, Thames Valley Police.

== See also ==
- List of defunct law enforcement agencies in the United Kingdom
