= Chepping Wycombe Borough Police =

Former police force in Buckinghamshire, England

Chepping Wycombe Borough Police was the police force responsible for policing the Borough of Wycombe, situated in the county of Buckinghamshire, England, until 1947.

It was formed as a result of the Municipal Corporations Act 1835. The force was amalgamated into Buckinghamshire Constabulary following the Police Act 1946.

Today, the area is policed by the successor to Buckinghamshire Constabulary, Thames Valley Police.
