= Chipping Norton Borough Police =

Defunct police force

Chipping Norton Borough Police was the police force responsible for policing the borough of Chipping Norton in Oxfordshire, England, until 1856.

It had been established in 1836 as a result of the Municipal Corporations Act 1835. The police force was very small throughout its 20-year history with only one constable in post in 1844. Chipping Norton Borough Police was amalgamated into the newly formed Oxfordshire Constabulary as a result of the County and Borough Police Act 1856.

Chipping Norton is today policed by the successor to Oxfordshire Constabulary, Thames Valley Police.
