= Maidenhead Borough Police =

Defunct police force

Maidenhead Borough Police was the police force responsible for policing the borough of Maidenhead in Berkshire, England from 1836 until 1889.

When the Borough of Maidenhead was reformed in 1836 by the Municipal Corporations Act 1835, it was required to form a police force. No formal police force was formed by the borough corporation although three part-time constables were employed at a nominal salary of £3 a year. By the 1850s the force was placed on a proper footing and comprised one superintendent and two constables. For a number of years after its formation the force was considered by the Inspectors of Constabulary to be inefficient, with the superintendent having no office and the constables not working at night. By the 1880s the force was much improved, numbering 11 officers - 1 superintendent, 2 sergeants and 8 constables.

Under the terms of the Local Government Act 1888 boroughs with a population of less than 10,000 were no longer required to maintain a separate police force. Accordingly, on 1 April 1889 the Maidenhead Borough Police was amalgamated into the Berkshire Constabulary.

Maidenhead is today policed by the successor to Berkshire Constabulary, Thames Valley Police.

== Superintendents ==
- 1843 – 1861: Daniel Sexton
- 1861 – 1875: Henry McGraw
- 1875 – 1880: W H Austin
- 1880 – 1889: James Taylor

== See also ==
- List of defunct law enforcement agencies in the United Kingdom
