= Wantage Borough Police =

- Common name: Wantage Borough Police

Agency overview
- Formed: 1828
- Dissolved: 1856
- Superseding agency: Berkshire Constabulary

Jurisdictional structure
- Operations jurisdiction: Berkshire, England, United Kingdom
- Legal jurisdiction: Town of Wantage

Operational structure
- Headquarters: Wantage

Wantage Borough Police was the police force responsible for policing the town of Wantage in Berkshire, England until 1856.

Unusually, and in contrast to the establishment of most borough police forces across England in the 1830s, this small police force was not established as a result of the Municipal Corporations Act 1835, but by a local improvement act. The long title of this act of Parliament was "An Act for the lighting, watching, cleansing, paving and otherwise improving the town of Wantage in the County of Berks". This act received royal assent on 19 June 1828. The act provided for night watchmen and a day patrol. Wantage Borough Police was amalgamated into Berkshire Constabulary in 1856.

Wantage is today policed by the successor to Berkshireshire Constabulary, Thames Valley Police.

== See also ==
- List of defunct law enforcement agencies in the United Kingdom
