= Oxford Town Hall =

Municipal building in Oxford, Oxfordshire, England

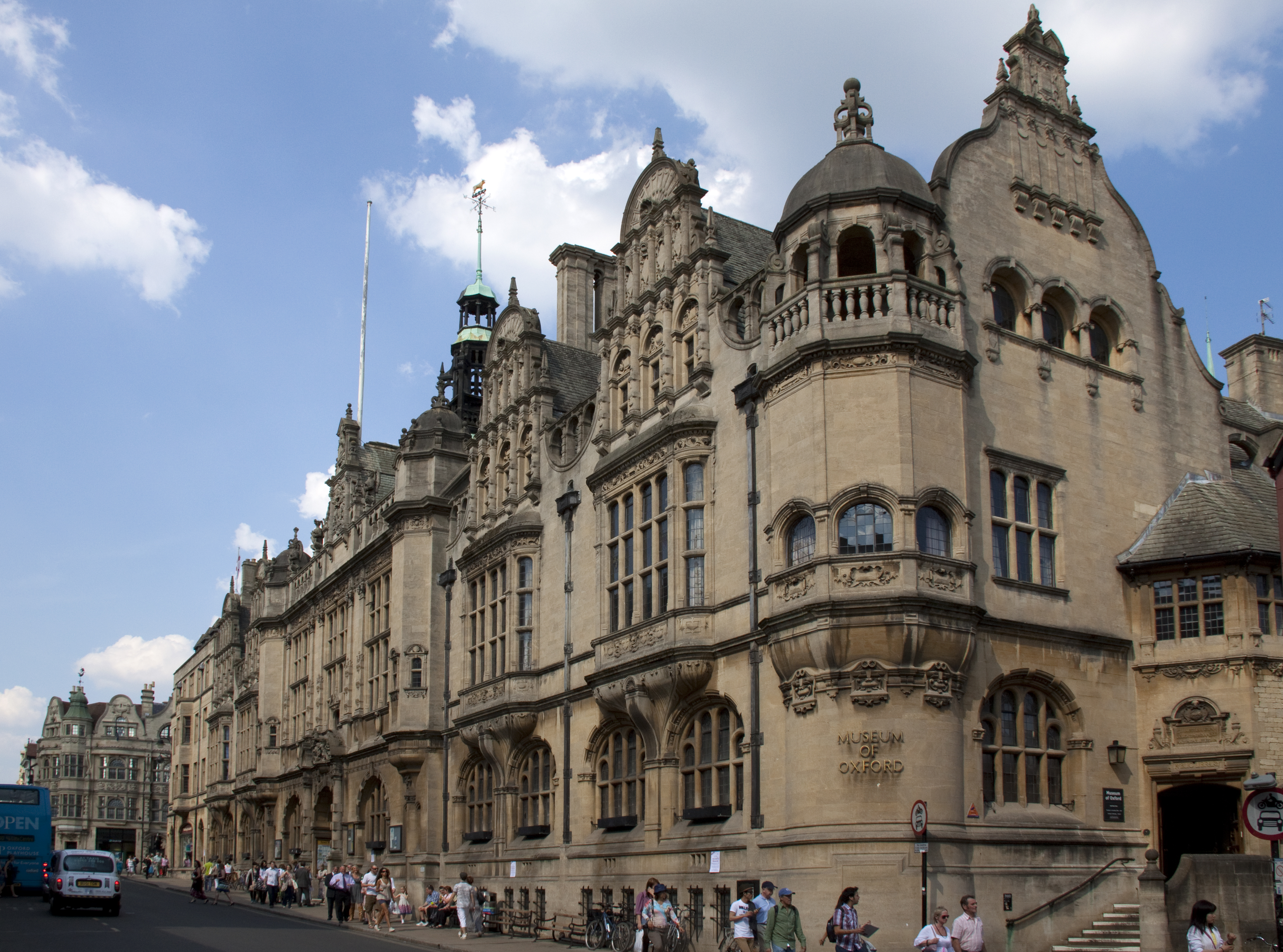
- View from the southwest

- Location within Oxford city centre

General information
- Type: Town hall, museum, former library and police station
- Architectural style: Jacobethan
- Classification

Listed Building – Grade II*
- Designated: 12 January 1954
- Reference no.: 1047153
- Location: St Aldate's, Oxford
- Coordinates: 51.7516°N 1.2569°W
- Construction started: 1893
- Completed: 1897
- Renovated: Main Hall repainted in 2015
- Cost: £100,000
- Owner: Oxford City Council

Design and construction
- Architect: Henry Hare

Website
- Oxford Town Hall

Oxford Town Hall is a public building on the street called St Aldate's in central Oxford, England. It is both the seat of Oxford City Council and a venue for public meetings, entertainment and other events. It also includes the Museum of Oxford. Although Oxford is a city with its own charter, the building is referred to as the "Town Hall" (the customary term for a seat of municipal government in the UK). It is Oxford's third seat of government to have stood on the same site. The present building, completed in 1897, is Grade II* listed.

== History ==
=== Site ===
Oxford's original guildhall was created by substantially repairing or rebuilding a house on the current site in about 1292.

It was replaced by a new building, designed by Isaac Ware in the Italianate style, in 1752. This consisted of a large room (the Town Hall itself, which functioned both as a public hall and as a courtroom) and an adjoining council chamber, above an open arcade which was used for a corn market. The building had been funded to a significant extent by Thomas Rowney; in 1844 a statue of Rowney was installed in a niche on the façade facing St Aldate's.

In the mid-1800s the open ground-floor level of the building was progressively filled in, to provide an office for the town clerk, accommodation for the local post office and a space for the City of Oxford Free Public Library and Reading Room (which opened in 1854). Subsequently, a separate set of offices were built for the town clerk, adjoining the north end of the town hall (when the new municipal buildings were constructed this was the only part of the old complex to be retained). Behind Ware's town hall was an open courtyard, around which were various other buildings including a school (Nixon's Free Grammar School, established in 1659), a police court and a residence for the chief constable. In the early 1860s, a corn exchange was built to the rear of the courtyard (designed by Samuel Lipscomb Seckham).

=== Replacement ===
By the 1870s the building was widely acknowledged to be inadequate for its purposes. The post office moved out to a new purpose-built building across the street in 1880, and the grammar school closed in 1885. In 1889 Oxford was made a county borough and the decision was taken to replace the old town hall (and neighbouring properties) with a new set of buildings. In 1891, an architectural design competition was held for a new building on the same site. The local architect Henry Hare won with a Jacobethan design. The 1752 building was demolished in 1893 and the foundation stone for the new building was laid on 6 July that year.

Hare's new building included a large public hall and new premises for Oxford's Court of Quarter Sessions, central public library and police station, as well as for the city council. At the time, the complex was referred to as the Municipal Buildings (while the term 'Town Hall' was used for the grand public hall to the rear).

=== Opening ===
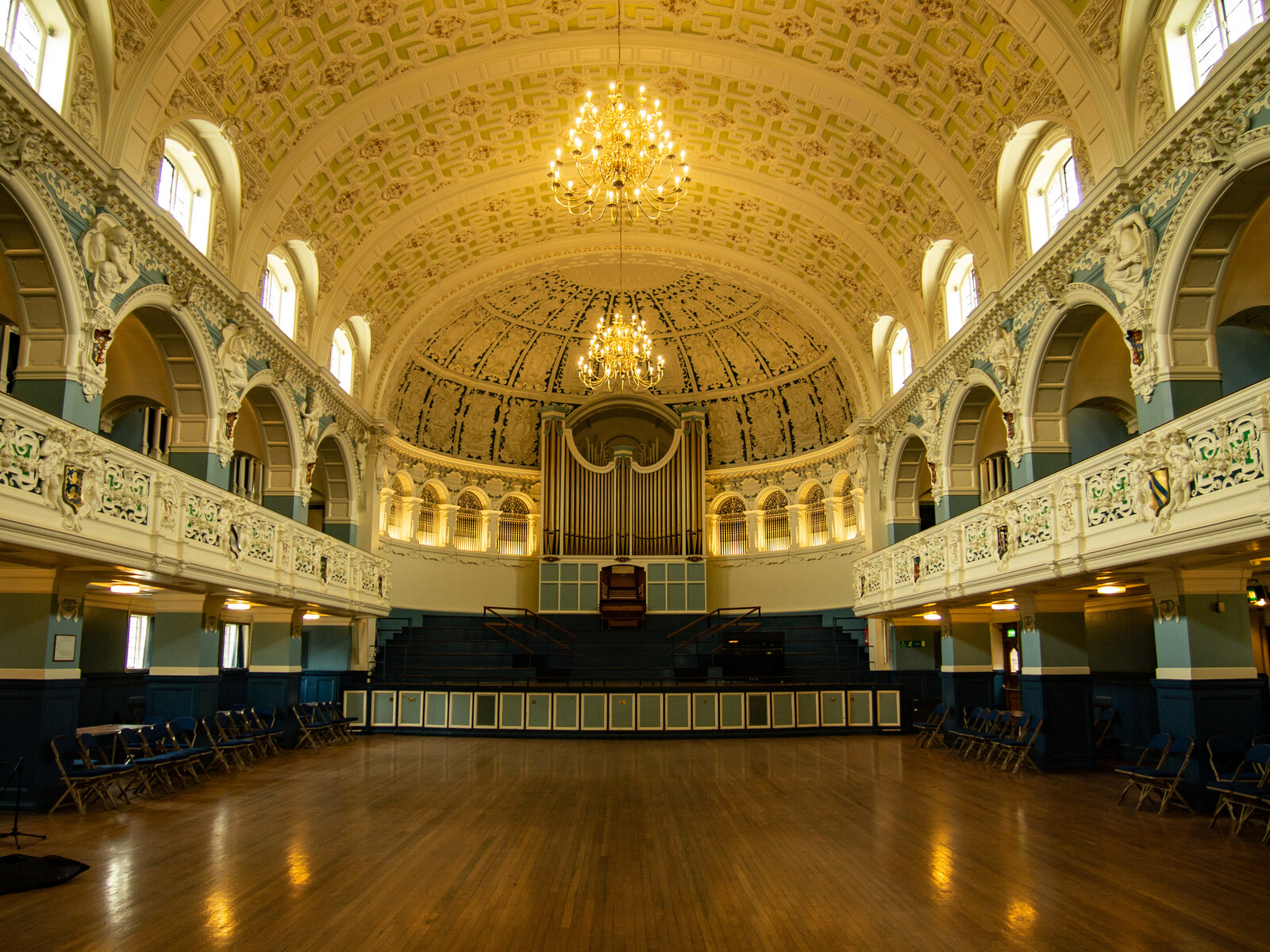
The main hall contains a Father Willis organ of 1897.

The Prince of Wales opened the new building on 12 May 1897, about a month before the Diamond Jubilee of Queen Victoria. University of Oxford undergraduates were expected to mount a large demonstration for the opening, so a detachment of the Metropolitan Police Mounted Branch was deployed to reinforce the small Oxford City Police force. The Metropolitan officers were unused to Oxford undergraduates, and considered the boisterous crowd a danger. The officers attacked the crowd with batons, causing several serious injuries. The crowd reciprocated, unhorsing one officer and trampling him. A young law don, FE Smith, who had taken no part in the violence, saw police mishandling his college servant. Smith went to rescue his servant but was arrested. He became the first prisoner in one of the cells of the new police station in the new Town Hall. Smith was charged with obstructing police officers in the execution of their duty, but at his trial the young lawyer was found not guilty.

=== Layout ===
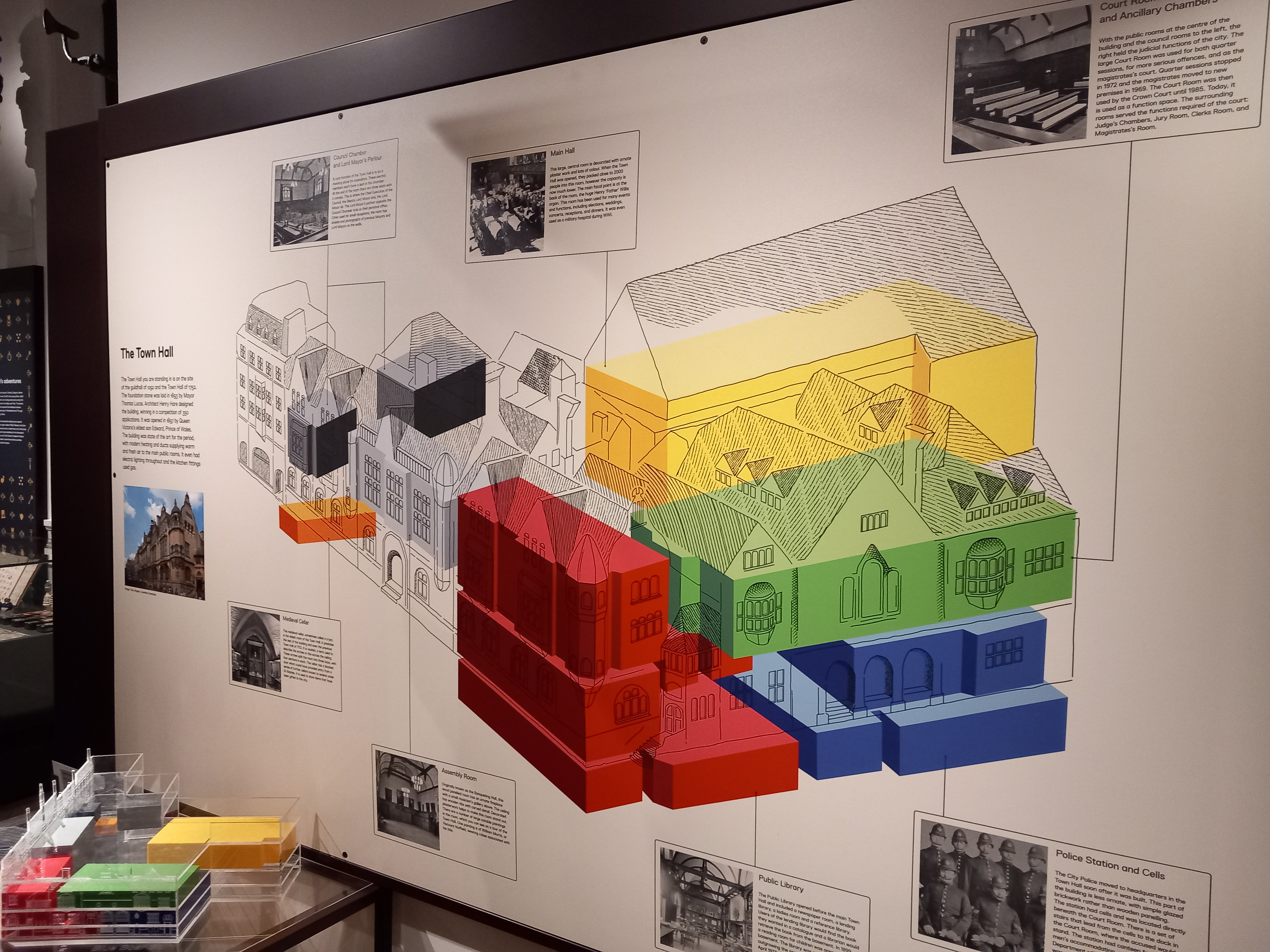
A 3D map of Oxford Town Hall, as part of an exhibit within the Museum of Oxford

When the complex opened, the central section (as viewed from St Aldate's) contained the principal public rooms: the assembly room (or banqueting hall) above the main entrance and the town hall (now known as the main hall) to the rear (built on the site of the old corn exchange). The north part of the building housed the 'Council department', with various municipal offices on the ground floor, and the council chamber, mayor's parlour and committee rooms on the first floor. To the south of the central section was the public library, behind which were the sessions court (first floor) and police station (below); a stairway led directly from the cells up into the dock of the courtroom.

The police station was at the rear in Blue Boar Street. A sizeable parade hall for the police officers was provided within the main hall undercroft. It was completed later than the rest of the building, but the Oxford City Police force was able to move there from its former station in Kemp Hall by the turn of the century.

=== Later developments ===
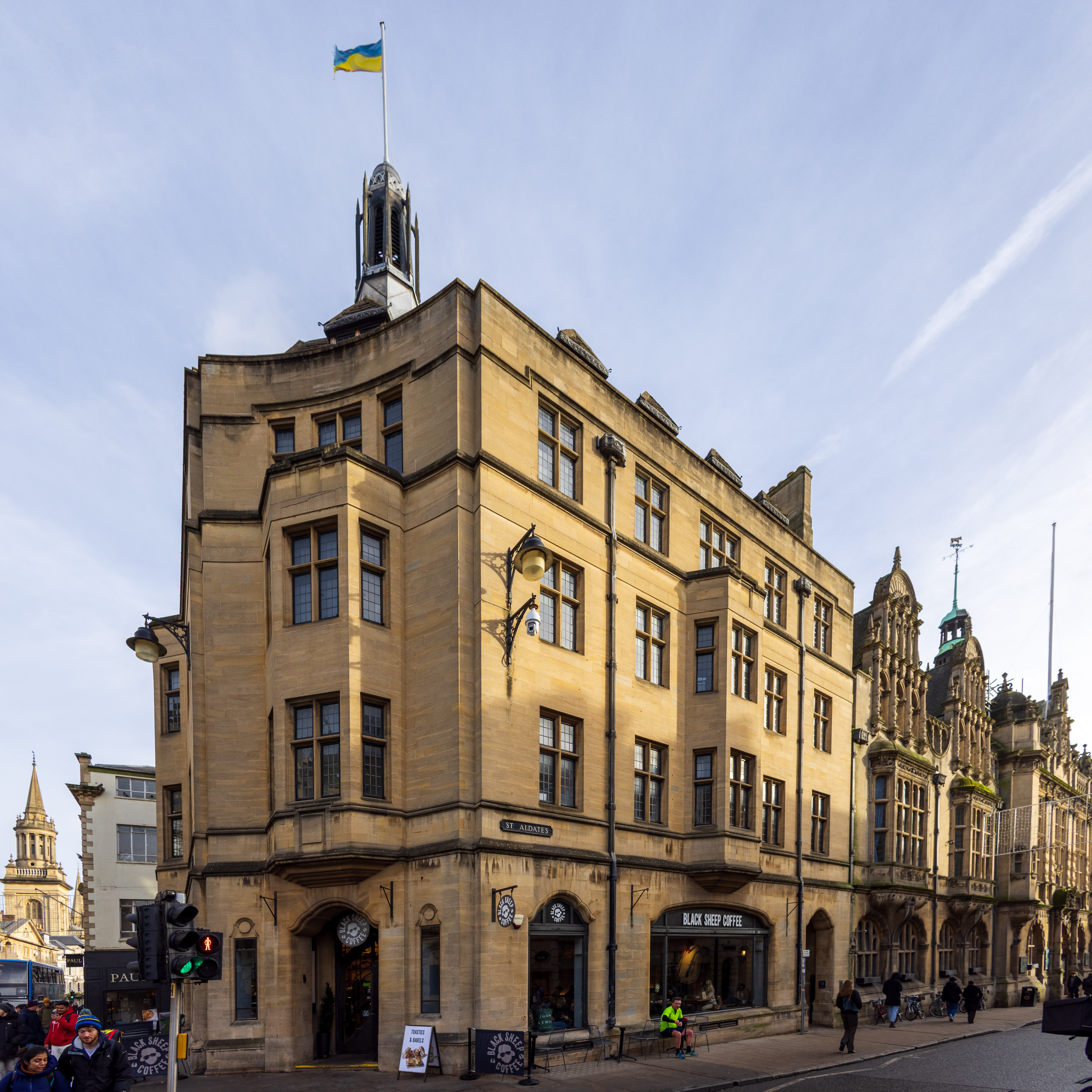
The Town Hall extension (Carfax House)

The City Council was accused of greatly exceeding the budget it set for the building project. In 1905 Henry Taunt published a leaflet in which he stated that the building was meant to cost £47,000 but ended up costing £100,000.

In the First World War the building was converted into the Town Hall section of the 3rd Southern General Hospital. From 1916 it specialised in treating soldiers suffering from malaria.

In 1932 an extension ('Carfax House') was built to the north, replacing the old Town Clerk's offices and sundry other properties which had stood between the Town Hall and the High Street. (A twin building was built at the same time on the other side of the street, facing Carfax Tower, but this was commercially let).

Oxford City Police moved to a new police station further down St Aldate's in 1936 and a new magistrates' court was opened in nearby Speedwell Street in 1969. The courtroom in the Town Hall continued to be used by the Crown Court until the opening of a new Oxford Combined Court Centre (opposite the police station) in 1985.

The central public library moved to new facilities at Westgate Centre in Queen Street which were completed in 1972. Taking its place in the Town Hall, the Museum of Oxford was opened in 1975.

By 1967 the city council had outgrown the office space in the town hall and moved its main offices to St Aldate's Chambers at 113 St Aldate's, a 1930s building opposite the town hall, but continued to use the town hall for meetings. In 2022 the council moved its offices back into the town hall.

=== Artworks ===
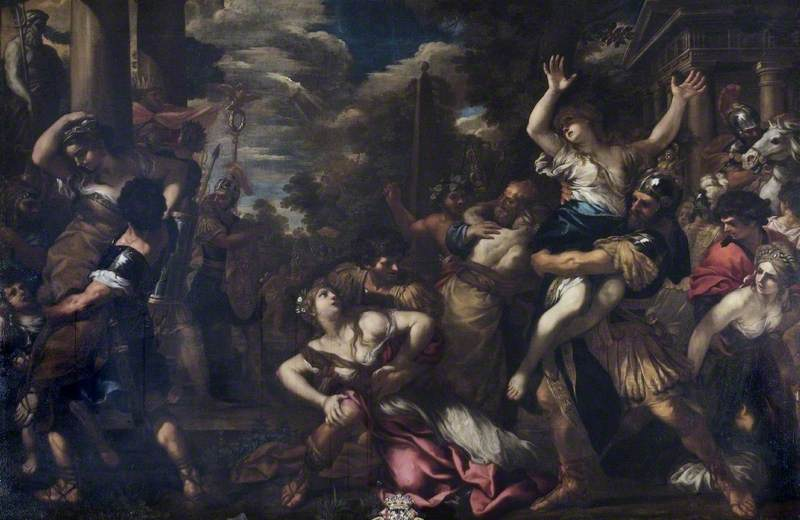
The Rape of the Sabines (by Cortona)

Works of art in the town hall include a portraits of King James II, Queen Anne and the Duke of Marlborough by Godfrey Kneller, a painting depicting the Rape of the Sabine Women by Pietro da Cortona and a painting depicting Saint Peter by Francesco Fontebasso.

The UK premiere of Ravel's opera L'enfant et les sortilèges (words by Colette) and staged premiere of Stravinsky's Oedipus Rex, conducted by Jack Westrup and directed by John Cox, took place at the town hall on 3 December 1958.

== See also ==
- Museum of Oxford, situated inside Oxford Town Hall
- Guild
- Guildhall

== Sources and further reading ==
- Graham, Malcolm (1973). Henry Taunt of Oxford: A Victorian Photographer. Headington: Oxford Illustrated Press. ISBN 0-902280-14-7.
- Hibbert, Christopher, ed. (1988). "Town Hall". The Encyclopaedia of Oxford. London: Macmillan. ISBN 0-333-39917-X.
- Rose, Geoff (1979). A Pictorial History of the Oxford City Police. Oxford: Oxford Publishing Co. ISBN 0-86093-094-7.
- Sherwood, Jennifer; Pevsner, Nikolaus (1974). Oxfordshire. The Buildings of England. Harmondsworth: Penguin Books. p. 302. ISBN 0-14-071045-0.
- Tyack, Geoffrey (1998). Oxford An Architectural Guide. Oxford & New York: Oxford University Press. pp. 259–262. ISBN 0-19-817423-3.
