= Chiltern Air Support Unit =

Former police aviation service providing air support in part of England

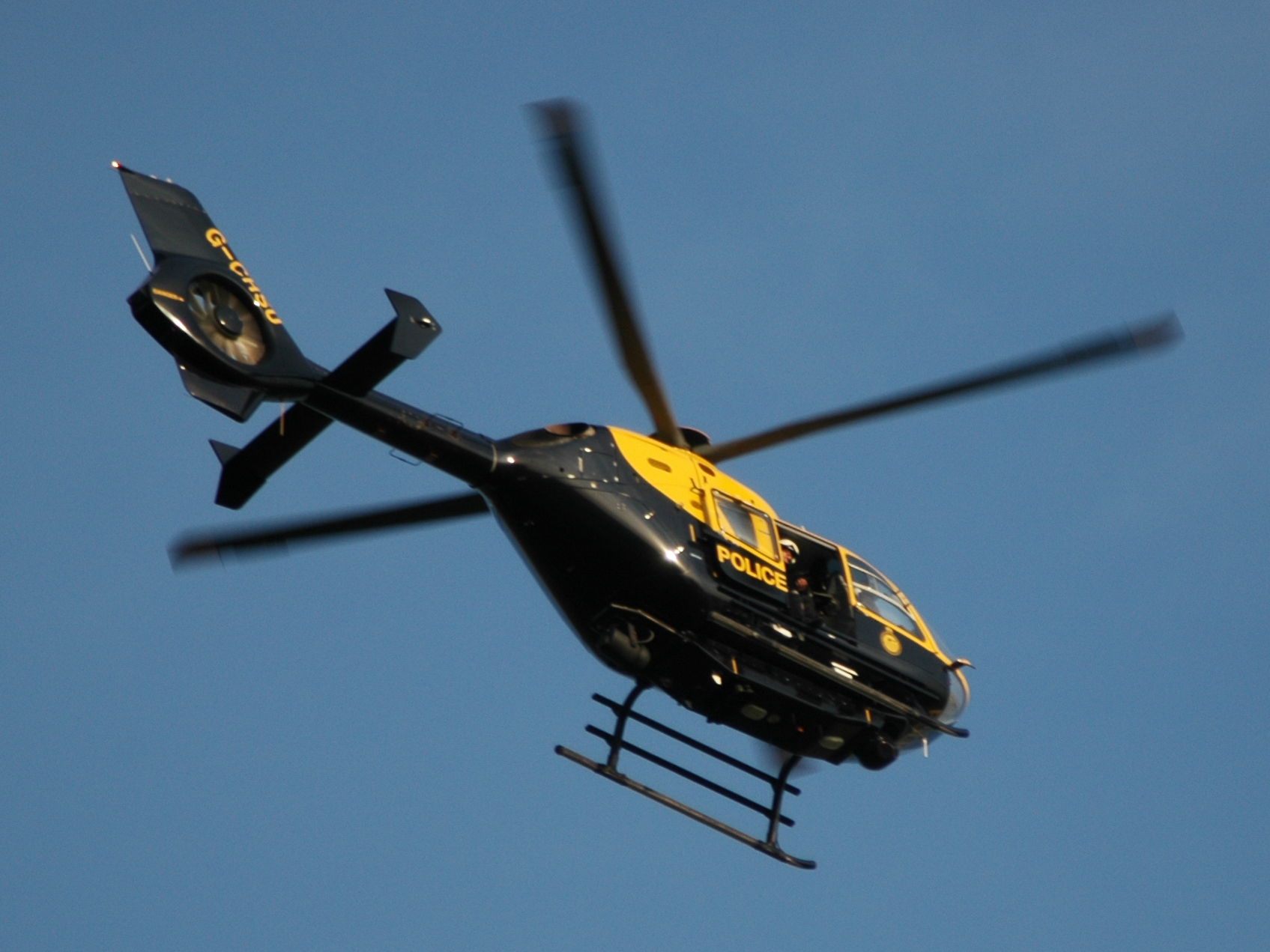
G-CHSU Eurocopter EC-135 in 2006

The Chiltern Air Support Unit (CASU) was a police helicopter unit that operated under a consortium agreement between Bedfordshire Police, Thames Valley Police and Hertfordshire Police until 1 October 2012, when it merged into the National Police Air Service.

== History ==
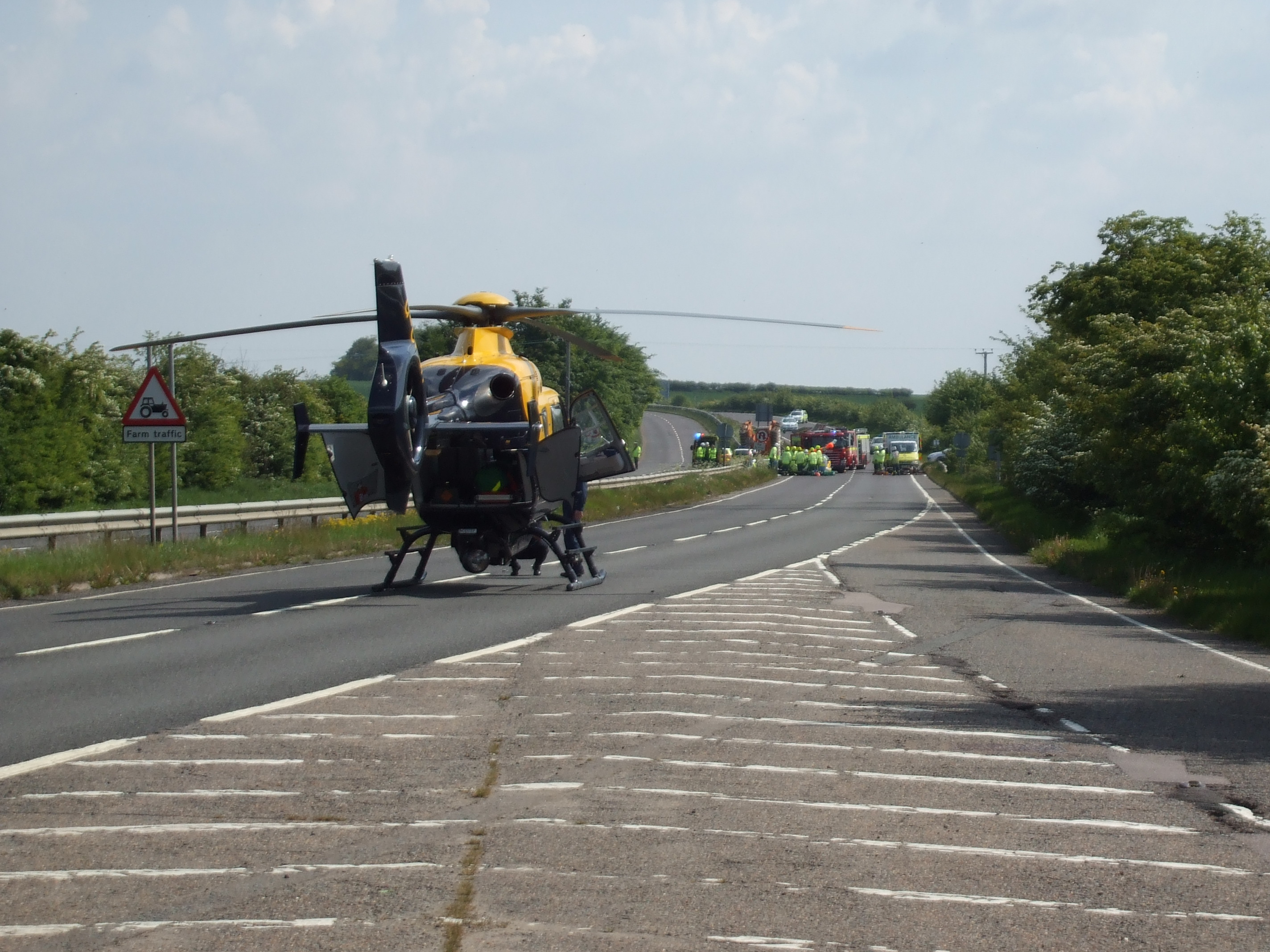
G-CPSH attending at scene of RTC on the A505 at Offley Grange

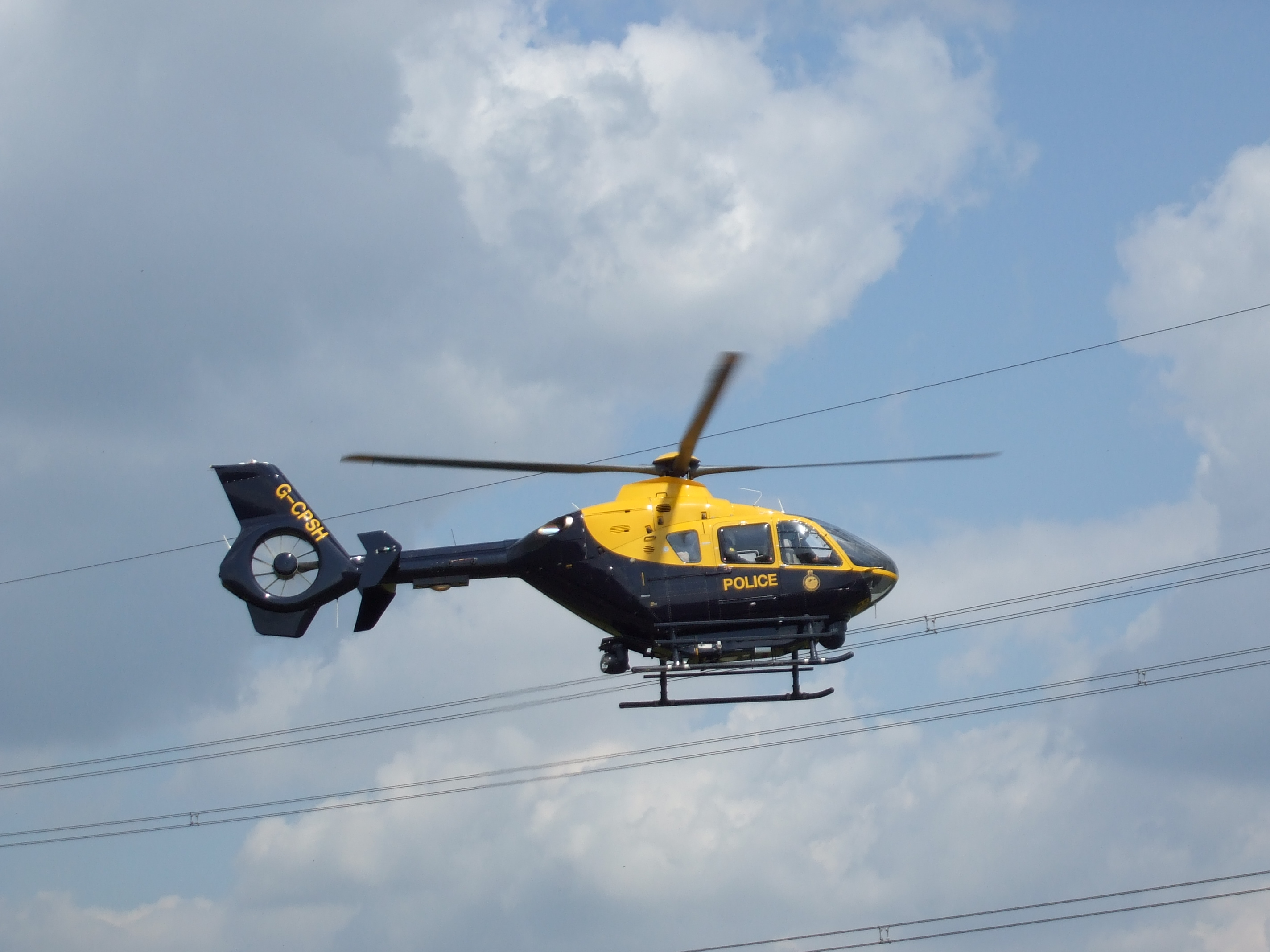
G-CPSH taking off from the scene of a RTC on the A505 at Offley Grange

Prior to 1980, Thames Valley Police occasionally used helicopters at special events. For example, in 1963, Oxford City Police experimented using a Brantley helicopter with a dog basket attached to the skids.

In 1980, an aircraft was used on twenty separate days at various events, with further use taking place during 1981. It was not until June 1982 that the first formally contracted flights took place.

During the next four years the helicopter was used more frequently. A single engine Aerospatiale A350 Squirrel helicopter designated G-JORR was hired for day-time operations for each weekday of 1985. This aircraft was based at Oxford Airport and used exclusively by the Thames Valley Police. Seven sergeants were drawn from the Traffic and Operations Departments as part-time observers.

During April 1986, the Thames Valley Police Air Support Unit, as it had become known, was relocated to RAF Abingdon. Providing daylight cover only, the Unit was allocated a budget of 650 flying hours, but was still crewed by sergeant observers on an ad hoc basis. It was recognised that the specialist skills required could no longer be met by part-time observers, and in 1988 the decision was taken to recruit and train dedicated observers.

The unit was renamed to the Chiltern Air Support Unit in 1996.

Chiltern Air Support's Luton helicopter (EC135T2 CPDS) moved from London Luton Airport to RAF Henlow, near Hitchin and Shillington. The helicopter was upgraded in 2001, and reached 10,000 hours of flying in September 2011. It operated using the call-sign XA99.

Chiltern's other helicopter (EC135T1CDS) is based at RAF Benson near Wallingford in Oxfordshire. An order was made to replace the current helicopter due to changes in the law. It is now a requirement that the aircraft should have an Autopilot to make operations safer. In October 2010, the helicopter was exchanged with another Eurocopter EC135P2+ registered G-TVHB. It operated using the call-sign XA97.

== National Police Air Service ==
On 1 October 2012, the Chiltern Air Support Unit was taken over by the newly created National Police Air Service. Only the Benson staff employed by the Chiltern Air Support Unit were seconded to West Yorkshire Police, who are the lead force for the NPAS. Aircraft and staff at the RAF Henlow site were disbanded and did not join NPAS, despite concerns being expressed by the Thames Valley Police Federation and a petition to UK Parliament being launched to protect the base.

== See also ==
- Police aviation in the United Kingdom
- Law enforcement in the United Kingdom
- Police aviation
