= Oxfordshire Constabulary =

Defunct British territorial police force

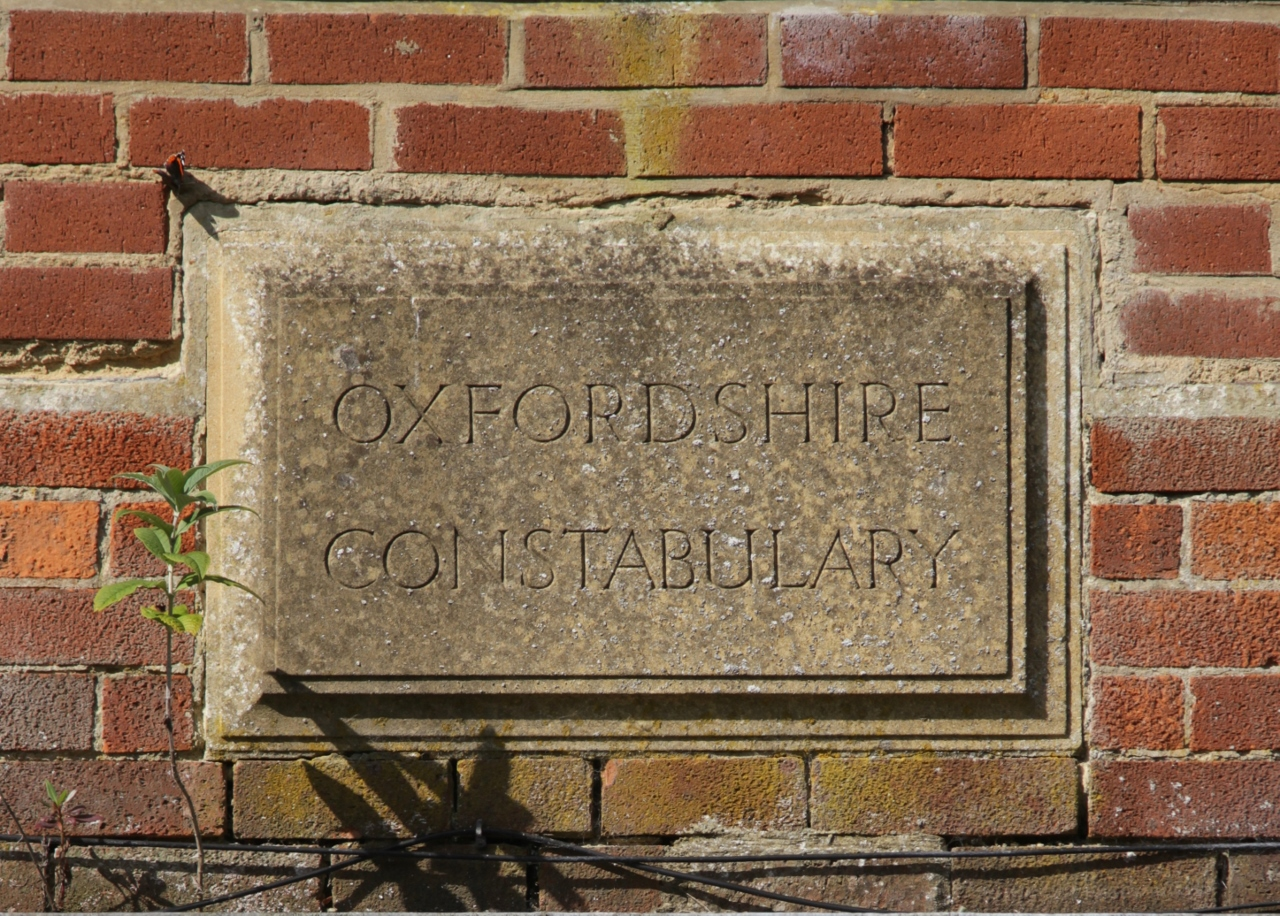
Inscription over the door of a former Oxfordshire Constabulary office in Oxford Road, Banbury

Oxfordshire Constabulary was the Home Office police force for the county of Oxfordshire, England, excluding the city of Oxford itself, from 1857 until 1968.

== History ==
Oxfordshire Constabulary was established in 1857. It absorbed Chipping Norton Borough Police and Henley Borough Police immediately. Banbury Borough Police was also amalgamated into the force 69 years later in 1925. In 1965 it had an establishment of 423 and an actual strength of 297.

On 1 April 1968 Oxfordshire Constabulary was amalgamated with Buckinghamshire Constabulary, Berkshire Constabulary, Oxford City Police and Reading Borough Police to form Thames Valley Constabulary.

== Chief Constables ==
- 1857–1888: Captain Charles Mostyn Owen
- 1888–1917: Lieutenant-Colonel the Hon. Edward Alexander Holmes à Court (died 1923)
- 1917-1920: Major Douglas Roberts (died 1920)
- 1921–1940: Captain Ernest Kennaway Arbuthnot
- 1940–1944: Colonel Sir Eric St Johnston (afterwards Chief Constable of Durham, 1944–50)
- 1945–1954: Lt.-Col. Herman Rutherford (afterwards Chief Constable of Lincolnshire, 1954–56)
- 1954-1964: James Edward Bailey (died 1964)
- 1964-68: David Holdsworth (previously Chief Constable of Wiltshire Constabulary) (afterwards Deputy Chief Constable of Thames Valley Constabulary)
- 1968 : Merged with other forces to form Thames Valley Police

== See also ==
- List of defunct law enforcement agencies in the United Kingdom
