= Caernarvonshire Constabulary =

Police force in Wales (1856–1950)

Agency overview
- Formed: 1856
- Dissolved: 1 October 1950

Jurisdictional structure
- Operations jurisdiction: Caernarvonshire, Wales, United Kingdom
- General nature: Civilian police

Operational structure
- Police officers: 174 (1950)

Caernarvonshire Constabulary was the Home Office police force for the county of Caernarvonshire, Wales from 1856 until 1950.

== History ==
The Constabulary was formed in 1856, under the County and Borough Police Act 1856, to replace the existing parish constables responsible for enforcing the law in local areas.

It was overseen by the county's Court of Quarter Sessions until 1888, and afterwards was administered by the Standing Joint Committee of Quarter Sessions and Caernarfonshire County Council. The Constabulary consisted of five divisions or districts (with their headquarters in Caernarfon, Bangor, Conwy, Porthmadog and Nefyn), and Pwllheli district remained independent until 1879 and was amalgamated with Porthmadog in 1892.

In 1950, it had a total of 174 staff. Under the Police Act 1946, it amalgamated with Anglesey Constabulary and Merionethshire Constabulary to form the Gwynedd Constabulary in 1950, which was later renamed North Wales Police in 1974. The Constabulary's archives are held at Gwynedd Archives.

== Chief Constables ==
- 1857–70 Thomas Parr Williams Ellis
- 1870–79 Charles Pearson
- 1879–86 James Martin Clayton
- 1886–1912 Arthur Ashley Ruck
- 1912–23 John Griffith
- 1923–39 Edward Williams
- 1939–45 Thomas John Pritchard
- 1945–50 Lt-Col. W. Jones Williams, OBE

== See also ==
- North Wales Police
