= North Wales Police =

Welsh territorial police force

North Wales Police Heddlu Gogledd Cymru
- Coat of arms of the North Wales Police.

Agency overview
- Formed: 1 April 1974; 52 years ago
- Annual budget: £167.1 million (2020/21)

Jurisdictional structure
- Operations jurisdiction: Anglesey, Conwy, Denbighshire, Flintshire, Gwynedd and Wrexham, Wales, United Kingdom
- Map of North Wales Police's jurisdiction
- Area: 6,290 km^{2} (2,430 sq mi)
- Population: 675,700
- Legal jurisdiction: England & Wales
- Constituting instrument: Police Act 1996
- General nature: Local civilian police

Operational structure
- Overseen by: His Majesty's Inspectorate of Constabulary and Fire & Rescue Services; Independent Office for Police Conduct
- Headquarters: Colwyn Bay
- Police officers: 1,510 (plus 170 Special Constables) (2020)
- Police and Crime Commissioner responsible: Andy Dunbobbin, Labour
- Agency executive: Amanda Blakeman, Chief Constable
- Divisions: 5: Business Services (Force wide); Corporate Services (Force wide); Crime Services (Force wide); Operational Support Services (Force wide); Local Policing Services (Force wide)

Website
- www.north-wales.police.uk

North Wales Police (Welsh: Heddlu Gogledd Cymru) is the territorial police force responsible for policing Anglesey, Conwy County Borough, Denbighshire, Flintshire, Gwynedd, and Wrexham County Borough in Wales. Its headquarters are in Colwyn Bay. As of March 2020, the force has 1,510 police officers, 170 special constables, 182 police community support officers (PCSO), 71 police support volunteers (PSV), and 984 staff.

== History ==
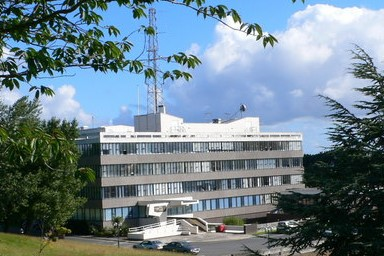
North Wales Police Headquarters in Colwyn Bay

Gwynedd Constabulary was formed in 1950 by the amalgamation of Caernarvonshire Constabulary, Anglesey Constabulary, and Merionethshire Constabulary under the Police Act 1946. In 1965, the force had an establishment of 308 and an actual strength of 296.

Flintshire Constabulary and Denbighshire Constabulary were merged into the force in 1967, but it retained its existing name. On 1 April 1974, the Local Government Act 1972 created an administrative county of Gwynedd covering part of the police area (broadly equivalent to the original Gwynedd Constabulary area). To avoid confusion, the force was renamed North Wales Police.

Under proposals made by the Home Secretary on 6 February 2006, the force would merge with Dyfed-Powys Police, Gwent Police and South Wales Police to form a single strategic force for all of Wales. The proposals were later shelved.

In May 2011, North Wales Police completed a major restructuring, moving from three territorial divisions to a single North Wales-wide policing function.

In 2026, Home Secretary Shabana Mahmood announced plans to merge the currently existing 43 police forces of England and Wales into 10-15 forces, with 12 being cited as a possible number. The prospect of an All-Wales police force popped back up again, as a result.

=== Governance ===
Since November 2012, the force has been overseen by the North Wales Police and Crime Commissioner. It was previously overseen by a police authority, consisting of 17 members (nine councillors, three magistrates and five independent members). The councillors were appointed by a joint committee from Anglesey, Conwy, Denbighshire, Flintshire, Gwynedd and Wrexham councils.

== Collaborations ==
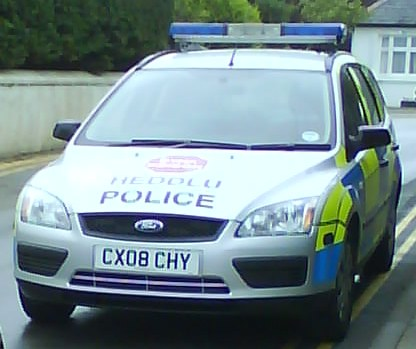
North Wales Police vehicle pictured in 2009

North Wales Police is a partner in the following collaboration:

- North West Police Underwater Search & Marine Unit
- North Wales and Cheshire Firearms Alliance
- Wales Extremism and Counter Terrorism Unit

The Cheshire and North Wales Alliance Dog Unit was formed in 2015 however was disbanded in 2025 and the forces retook ownership of their respective dog units.

== Controversy ==
In the 2000s, North Wales Police attracted a great deal of media attention, largely attributed to its former chief constable, Richard Brunstrom, who was a controversial figure, mainly because of his vocal views on speeding motorists and the legalisation of drugs. The Sun newspaper dubbed him the "Mad Mullah of the Traffic Taleban." However, he also earned respect for modernising the force's infrastructure, and learning the Welsh language, actively promoting the normalisation of its use within the force at all levels and conversing publicly through it on numerous occasions.

In April 2007, Brunstrom came under fire for an incident in which he showed a photograph of the severed head of a biker in a press meeting without the family's permission, to make a point about road safety. The photo enabled the media to identify the deceased since he was wearing a distinctive T-shirt with an anti-police message on it, which gained much attention during the inquest. Brunstrom maintained (in both the invitation and verbally) that it was a "closed" meeting, and that no details of the picture should have been leaked. Motorcycle News magazine handed in a 1,600 signature petition to the Independent Police Complaints Commission requesting Brunstrom be removed. The IPCC confirmed that it would carry out an independent review into the incident.

North Wales Police has also attracted attention due to its investigation into allegations of anti-Welsh comments by TV personality Anne Robinson and UK Prime Minister Tony Blair. The force was believed to have carried out these investigations following complaints from members of the public. The ten-month investigation into the Prime Minister was dropped on 11 July 2006 due to a lack of evidence. It had cost £1,656, whereas the Anne Robinson investigation cost £3,800.

North Wales Police is one of only three forces in England and Wales (the others being neighbouring Dyfed-Powys Police and the British Transport Police) to equip their police community support officers with handcuffs, which remains controversial. As of 31 March 2011, North Wales Police had 159 PCSOs.

Between April 2017 and April 2019, the Independent Office for Police Conduct twice investigated the circumstances behind the murder of Nicholas Churton. Additionally, a separate inquiry about the allegations made by Ian Lucas, Member of Parliament for Wrexham that he had been misled about the case by Mark Polin, the chief constable.

== Chief constables ==
- 1974–1982: Sir Philip Myers
- 1982–1994: David Owen
- 1994–2001: Michael Argent
- 2001–2009: Richard Brunstrom
- 2010–2018: Mark Polin
- 2018–2019: Gareth Pritchard (temporary)
- 2019–2022: Carl Foulkes
- 2022–present: Amanda Blakeman (Note: Blakeman retired for one day on 15 January 2026 in order to protect her pension, which would've fallen in value after 30 years' unbroken service, before taking up the post again on 17 January.)

== See also ==
- Police forces of Wales
- List of law enforcement agencies in the United Kingdom, Crown Dependencies and British Overseas Territories
- Law enforcement in the United Kingdom
- North Wales Fire and Rescue Service
