= Oxford City Police =

Defunct British territorial police force

Agency overview
- Formed: 1 January 1869
- Preceding agency: watch and ward
- Dissolved: 1 April 1968
- Superseding agency: Thames Valley Constabulary
- Employees: 135 officers (1945)

Jurisdictional structure
- Legal jurisdiction: County of Oxfordshire
- Governing body: watch committee

Operational structure
- Headquarters: Kemp Hall (1870–97); Blue Boar Street (1897–1938); St Aldate's (1938–68)

Notables
- People: Charles Head, Superintendent 1869–97; Oswald Cole, Chief Constable 1897–1924; Charles Fox, Chief Constable 1924–1956; Clement Burrows, Chief Constable 1956–1968

Oxford City Police was the police force of the City of Oxford, England. It policed the city from 1 January 1869 until 31 March 1968.

It was established to succeed a "watch and ward" force that had been founded in 1835. On 1 April 1968 it and four other forces merged to form the Thames Valley Constabulary, which has since been renamed Thames Valley Police.

== Foundation ==
The Municipal Corporations Act 1835 required each incorporated borough in England or Wales to form a watch committee, and for that committee to establish a force of constables to police their borough. But the Oxford University Police, which had been founded in 1829, already policed the city at night, so the new municipal "watch and ward" force policed the city only by day.

In 1868 Parliament passed the Oxford Police Act, which empowered the Corporation of Oxford to supersede its "watch and ward" force with a modern one that would be modelled on London's Metropolitan Police Force and whose duties would including night policing of the city.

The first Chief Officer was Charles Head, who had been an Inspector with "D" Division of the Metropolitan Police. Head served as the force's Chief Officer for 28 years.

Toward the end of 1868 Head and six other Metropolitan Police officers moved to Oxford to form the nucleus of the new force. Two were made Inspectors of the new force: Malcolm Hunter and George Barratt. Other recruits included five men from the Oxford University Police and four from the preceding "watch and ward" force. The new force's initial complement was between 25 and 30 officers.

Oxford's police station had since at least 1843 been based in an office on the corner of Queen Street and St Aldate's, but in 1870 it moved into Kemp Hall, a Jacobean timber-framed house built in 1637 in a narrow yard south of the High Street. Necessary alterations to the building were not complete by 1 January 1869, so the new force was at first accommodated in a committee room in Oxford Town Hall. In October 1870 Kemp Hall was finally ready for the force to move in. As well as offices and cells, the station included lodgings upstairs for 14 or 15 unmarried officers.

At first the force did not have uniforms for all its officers. On 4 February 1869 two constables named Gilkes and Wilkes, who lacked uniforms, were sent to patrol St. Ebbes, which then was a poor parish of the city. Little is known of Wilkes, but Joseph Gilkes was originally from Great Rollright and had served as a constable with the Metropolitan Police.

Gilkes and Wilkes found a crowd of about 30 people outside a shop in Blackfriars Road, whom they tried to disperse. A man called John Cox assaulted Gilkes, and his wife Keziah Cox threw a meat dish at him, striking him in the head. Gilkes was knocked to the ground and Wilkes fled back to the police station.

Gilkes got to his feet and tried to escape, but was pursued by the crowd throwing plates and saucepans at him. Blackfriars Road ended at the River Thames. Gilkes tried to ford the river to escape, but it was in flood and he was swept away and drowned.

== Blue Boar Street police station ==
In 1893 work began to build a new Oxford Town Hall, which was to include a new police station to succeed Kemp Hall. The Prince of Wales opened the new building in May 1897.

University of Oxford undergraduates were expected to mount a large demonstration at the opening ceremony, so a detachment of the Metropolitan Police Mounted Branch was deployed to reinforce the small Oxford force. The Metropolitan officers were unused to Oxford undergraduates, and considered the boisterous crowd to be a danger. The officers attacked the crowd with batons, causing several serious injuries. The crowd reciprocated, unhorsing one officer and trampling him.

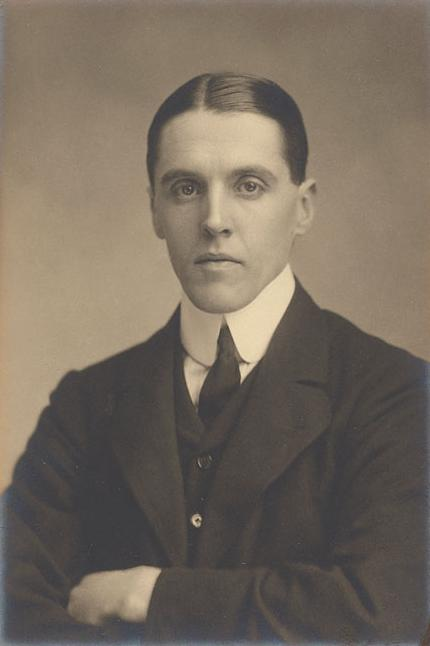
In 1897 the lawyer FE Smith was detained as the first prisoner in the cells of the police station in the newly built Oxford Town Hall. He later served as Solicitor General and Lord Chancellor.

A young law don, FE Smith, who had taken no part in the violence, saw police mishandling his college servant. Smith went to rescue his servant but was arrested. He became the first prisoner in one of the cells of the new police station in the new Town Hall.

But the new police station was not completely ready for use. The force continued to operate from Kemp Hall, and did not move to the town hall until nearer the end of the century. It was called Blue Boar Street police station, after the street down the side of the Town Hall in which it had its entrance. As at Kemp Hall, accommodation was provided for unmarried officers to live on the premises. The officers' new rooms were at the top of the Town Hall.

A house called Ebor House was built in Blue Boar Street as accommodation for the Chief Officer. Charles Head retired on 12 March 1897, so its first occupant was probably his successor, Oswald Cole. Cole was born in Manchester and had spent his boyhood in York. He joined the Metropolitan Police in 1886, enjoyed rapid promotion and had transferred to the Oxford force in 1891. Upon Cole's appointment the title was changed from Chief Officer or Superintendent to Chief Constable.

Cole was a keen cricketer. He did much to develop the force's sporting activities, including its tug of war team which became very successful.

== Other police stations ==
By 1903 the force had stations in Cowley and Summertown. In October 1909 East Oxford police station opened at the junction of St Mary's Road and James Street.

== First World War ==
When the First World War broke out, seven officers who were Army reservists were recalled to their regiments. In 1916 conscription was introduced in Great Britain. 36 Oxford officers were called up, leaving the force under strength. In 1917 the force recruited its first woman constable, Grace Costin.

In August 1918 and June 1919 there were two national police strikes. Officers of the Oxford force did not take part.

== The Interbellum ==
On 5 March 1924 Oswald Cole died at his desk in his office. He had been ill with pneumonia. Chief Inspector Osbourne took over as acting chief constable, but it was Charles Fox who was appointed as Cole's permanent successor. Fox was born in Hove in East Sussex. He had served with Portsmouth Borough Police in Hampshire, transferred to Oxford in 1914 and been promoted to Sergeant. In 1917 he joined the Royal Field Artillery, with whom he served in India. After the war he returned to Oxford and resumed his police career. Fox was only 28 when he was put in charge, making him one of the youngest Chief Constables in the country.

The force continued to have a diverse sporting and cultural life. In 1925 it even had its own Morris dancing side.

The force introduced its first police motorcycle, a Sunbeam, in 1928. Thereafter it used both solo machines and sidecar combinations. Soon afterward police cars were introduced, initially Morris cars built in Oxford and MG T-type sports cars built in nearby Abingdon.

On 15 October 1931 the force suffered its second death of an in the line of duty. PC Alfred Needle, aged 23, was fatally injured by a motor car which failed to stop.

In 1938 a serial blackmailer, Patrick Tuellman, tried to kidnap William Morris, the head of Morris Motors, for a £100,000 ransom. Tuellman had an accomplice, who betrayed his plan to the police. On 28 May 1938 the Oxford police ambushed Tuellman in his car. Officers found him to be in possession of two automatic pistols, ammunition and items of disguise. Two months later Birmingham Assizes tried him and he served seven years' penal servitude.

In 1936 Fox called for a new, larger police station. This was built lower down St Aldate's Street, opposite the junction with Speedwell Street, and completed in 1938.

== Second World War ==
When the Second World War broke out, Charles Fox was made Air Raid Precautions controller in addition to his duties as Chief Constable. Some of his officers were trained as firefighters or ambulance drivers in addition to their police duties. As in the First World War, numerous officers were enlisted in the armed forces. 39 War Reserve constables were appointed to cover their absence.

At the end of the war the force's strength was 134 officers and one woman sergeant. In 1946 a war memorial at St Aldate's police station was unveiled to commemorate those officers who were lost serving in the armed forces.

== Final decades ==
After the war the force continued to modernise. Its vehicle fleet became somewhat mixed, including two 1945 MG TC Midget sports cars, a 1948 Riley RM saloon built in Abingdon, three Wolseley saloons built in Cowley, at least two other saloon cars, a large van and a BSA motorcycle.

In 1956 Charles Fox retired as Chief Constable and the Watch Committee appointed Clement Burrows as his successor. Burrows was an outside appointment. He had joined the Somerset Constabulary in 1927, risen to Chief Inspector, and from 1953 he had been Assistant Commandant of the Police College.

Burrows modernised and diversified the force, introducing a police dog section in July 1959 and asking for his foot patrol officers to be equipped with portable police radio. New motorcycles were introduced, including a 1957 single-cylinder Royal Enfield, two 1958 or 1959 Triumph twins and a 1959 or 1960 Triumph twin. New cars included a Morris Isis, a 1959 Wolseley 15/60 saloon and 1962 Morris 1100.

Burrows introduced the city's first portable speed radar in 1961. With it his officers caught 508 offenders in the second half of that year. In 1964 Traffic Wardens were introduced, and a telex machine was installed in St Aldate's police station.

The dog section used German Shepherds. Initially it had only two handlers and two dogs, "Kim" and "Danko". In 1961 "Kim" contracted an incurable eye infection, was put down and replaced with a new dog, "Kim II". In 1962 the section was doubled with two additional handlers and their dogs "Micky" and "Rex". "Danko" was the force's longest-serving dog. In his career he made 30 arrests. But in 1965 he suffered a leg injury and had to be put down. In 1966 "Micky" retired from the force with his handler. They were succeeded by a new handler with the Oxford force's final dog, "Kelly".

In his Annual Report for 1957 Burrows had said he wanted beat officers to have portable radios "within five years". In fact they were not introduced until November 1965. Until then the force had a network of Police telephone pillars. These were soon removed except for one at Carfax, which survived until at least 1979.

The force was growing and was restructured into three divisions. "A" Division was administrative, "B" Division policed central Oxford and "C" Division policed Cowley. The original Cowley police station was replaced by a new one in Oxford Road that was opened on 14 September 1966.

Drug abuse was an increasing problem, notably among some of Oxford's students. In 1967 the Oxford force formed the country's first drug squad.

Since the 1930s most of the Oxford force's police cars had been built by the Nuffield Organization: Morris, MG, Riley and Wolseley. In its final year the force changed its practice by acquiring from Hartwell, a local dealer, four of Ford's newly introduced Escort Mk I saloons.

== Dissolution ==
From the late 19th century to the mid 20th century many incorporated boroughs in Great Britain had their own police forces. Separately, each county also had its own police force. By 1962 Great Britain had 158 civil police forces, and of these 97 had fewer than 350 officers. Many forces had standing arrangements to co-operate with neighbouring forces. Oxford City Police, for example, cooperated with Oxfordshire Constabulary and until 1961 the two forces had shared a joint scheme for police radio. But it was not clear that such small forces were the best way to police Great Britain.

The question was compounded by corruption cases, notably involving Brighton borough police in 1958 and Nottingham City Police in 1959. There was no suggestion of such corruption involving the Oxford force. But in 1960 a Royal Commission, the Willink Commission, was established to review the governance of police forces in Great Britain and make recommendations.

In 1962 the Willink Commission submitted its report, which recommended that a police force should have more than 500 members and should police an area with a population of at least 250,000. It recommended exempting small forces of between 200 and 350 officers, but "justifiable only by special circumstances such as the distribution of the population and the geography of the area".

Parliament accepted Willink Commission's findings and passed the Police Act 1964, which provided inter alia for small forces to be merged. Oxford had too small a population and too few officers to remain independent, and no special circumstances that qualified for an exemption. Therefore, on 1 April 1968 the Oxford force merged with Oxfordshire, Berkshire and Buckinghamshire County Constabularies and Reading Borough Police to form Thames Valley Constabulary.

Clement Burrows was made Assistant Chief Constable (Administration) of the new force, and in 1970 was promoted to Deputy Chief Constable.

Thames Valley Constabulary was later renamed Thames Valley Police. It remains the police force for Berkshire, Buckinghamshire and Oxfordshire.

== In popular culture ==
ITV's fictional drama series Endeavour portrays Detective Constable Endeavour Morse as he investigates crime in Oxford as a member of Oxford CID, based in Cowley police station. The first series starts some time after the General Election in October 1964. Its fifth series starts in April 1968, just after the Oxford force's absorption into the new Thames Valley Constabulary.

The series are a prequel to the Inspector Morse drama series, in which a much older Endeavour Morse, by then a Detective Chief Inspector, investigates murders in and around Oxford with Thames Valley Police.

== See also ==
- List of defunct law enforcement agencies in the United Kingdom

== Bibliography ==
- Crossley, Alan; Elrington, CR, eds. (1979). "Modern Oxford". A History of the County of Oxford. Victoria County History. Vol. IV: The City of Oxford. Oxford University Press for the Institute of Historical Research. pp. 181–259. ISBN 978-0197227145.
- Rose, Geoff (1979). A Pictorial History of the Oxford City Police. Oxford: Oxford Publishing Co. ISBN 0-86093-094-7.
