= Murder of Nicholas Churton =

2017 murder case in Wales

- Location: Crescent Close, Wrexham, Wales
- Date: 23 or 24 March 2017
- Weapons: Machete, hammer
- Victim: Nicholas Churton
- Perpetrator: Jordan James Lee Davidson
- Verdict: Guilty
- Convictions: Murder and other charges unrelated to Churton

In March 2017, Nicholas Churton was murdered at his home in Wrexham by Jordan James Lee Davidson. The case resulted in three Independent Police Complaints Commission investigations. Churton, aged 67, lived alone at Crescent Close, Wrexham. He was a retired restaurateur who had run restaurants in Rossett, Wrexham and Tarporley, Cheshire. North Wales Police described him as vulnerable and partly disabled.

== Events prior to the murder ==
Jordan James Lee Davidson, a 25-year-old male, committed the murder. In December 2016, he was released from HMP Parc on license. Afterwards, North Wales Police dealt with him on eight occasions before the murder of Nicholas Churton.

- 4 December 2016 – A theft to which he pleaded guilty in court.
- 31 January 2017 – He reported being assaulted.
- 14 February 2017 – An allegation of sexual assault, but he was not charged due to insufficient evidence.
- 1 March 2017 – A theft to which he pleaded guilty in court.
- 8 March 2017 – A report from a member of the public that there was an unknown male inside her vehicle. Jordan Davidson was identified as a suspect but was not charged.
- March 2017 – A report by Jordan Davidson's landlord that he was bringing stolen property back to the address and that he wished him to leave.
- 13 March 2017 – Arrested for breach of the peace, but later released.
- 19 March 2017 – Arrested for possession of a bladed article in a public place, and released on police bail.

On 14 March 2017, Nicholas Churton reported a robbery at his home address in Wrexham that had happened two days previously (12 March 2017). He alleged that a person called Jordan had threatened him with a hammer and stolen a set of keys after he had let him into his home to use the toilet. On 21 March, Churton was spoken to by North Wales Police Officers, who asked him to take steps to help identify Jordan. On 23 March, he told them that Jordan Davidson was the offender.

== Murder ==
At 8:23am on 27 March 2017, Nicholas Churton was found dead at his home. He had been murdered some time between 23 March and 24 March 2017. He had been attacked with a machete and a hammer. The murder investigation was led by Detective Superintendent Iestyn Davies, North Wales Police.

== Post-murder offences ==
Jordan Davidson, the day after the murder, committed a further robbery of an elderly male at his home with the same machete he used in the murder. A few days later, he attacked a 53-year-old male with a hammer, fracturing his skull. While being arrested for murder and other offences, he attacked two police officers, PC Rhys Rushby and PC David Hall with a hammer. Subsequently, both police officers were nominated to attend the National Police Bravery Awards 2019. He also assaulted another police officer during his interview for murder. While on remand he slashed a prison officer's neck with a makeshift knife.

== Court cases ==
On 30 November 2017, Jordan Davidson pleaded guilty of the murder of Nicholas Churton and twelve other offences at Mold Crown Court. He was sentenced to a minimum of 23 years and four months imprisonment. Subsequently, Solicitor General Robert Buckland QC MP argued that Jordan Davidson's original sentence was too low, referred it to the Court of Appeal, and the sentence was increased to a minimum of 30 years imprisonment.

== Independent Police Complaints Commission (IPCC) investigations ==
In April 2017, North Wales Police self-referred the incident to the Independent Police Complaints Commission for investigation (IPCC). On 6 December 2017, the IPCC reported that four police officers and one civilian staff member were being investigated for criminal offences due to the incidents. On 30 May 2018, the IPCC reported that it had started a second investigation into the circumstance behind the murder of Nicholas Churton. The focus of that investigation was the management of Jordan Davidson between his release from Parc prison in December 2016 on licence and the murder in March 2017. The scope of the investigation was the compliance of North Wales Police with both theirs and national policies on post-release offender management .

On 31 October 2018, the IPCC reported that it had concluded the first investigation into the murder. The IPCC mentioned several issues about the investigation into the robbery reported by Nicholas Churton. The police officers that spoke to him had recorded the complaint as theft, rather than robbery, and that had influenced the threat and risk assessment of the incident. Additionally, his vulnerability was incorrectly assessed. Furthermore, the details of the person who was able to identify Jordan Davidson as the offender for the robbery were not recorded. The IPCC stated that some police officers were identified as potentially committing police disciplinary offences. A police sergeant and acting police inspector were dealt with for unsatisfactory supervision of their staff. A further two police officers appeared at a misconduct meeting held by North Wales Police, at which they were found not to have committed misconduct, but were dealt with for unsatisfactory performance.

On 28 November 2019, the IPCC reported the result of its second investigation into the case. It called for North Wales Police, the National Probation Service, and Community Rehabilitation Company to improve their procedures for sharing information. The IPCC investigation found that Jordan Davidson was dealt with by North Wales police on eight occasions between his release from Parc prison and the murder of Nicholas Churton. Due to procedural issues there was insufficient information shared between North Wales Police and the Probation Service. However, North Wales Police had not breached any national policies. The reason was that at the time Jordan Davidson was released from Parc prison, he had not committed any sexual or violent offences. Therefore, he was not categorised as a high risk offender that needed supervision as a category one or two Multi-Agency Public Protection Arrangements (MAPPA) offender. It was not within the remit of the IPCC to investigate the Probation service or Community Rehabilitation Company. As a result of the second investigation a further police sergeant was referred to North Wales Police for consideration of a misconduct hearing.

== Parliamentary debate ==
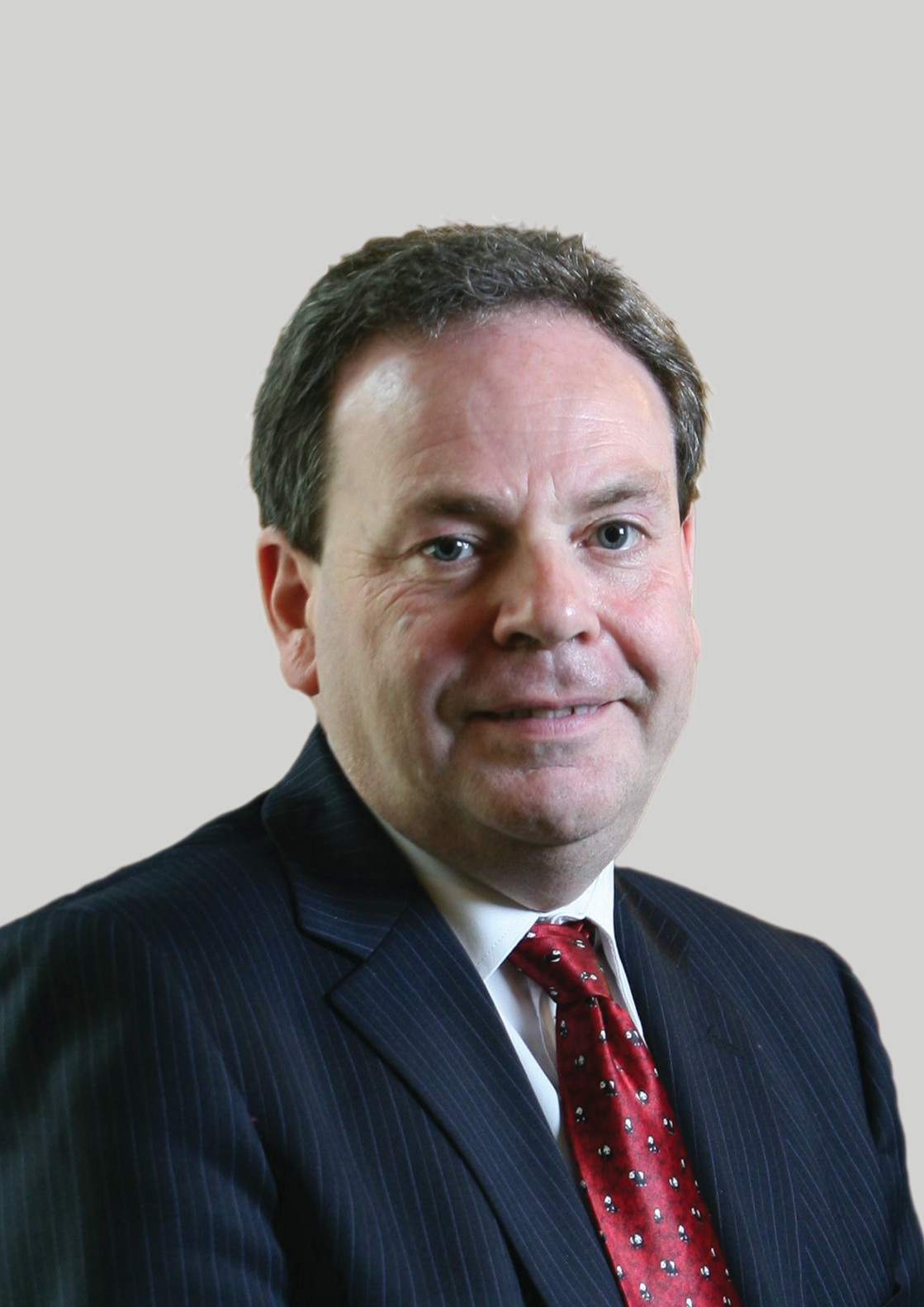
Ian Lucas

On 11 April 2019, Ian Lucas, Member of Parliament for Wrexham, secured an adjournment debate in the House of Commons about the murder of Nicolas Churton. He stated that he had learned about the errors in the case from Jez Hemming, a reporter for the Daily Post. He accused North Wales Police, the probation service, the community rehabilitation company, the Independent Police Complaints Commission, and the Independent Office for Police Conduct of hiding the mistakes. He further alleged that Mark Polin, the Chief Constable for North Wales Police had misled him about the case. Nick Hurd, the Minister for Policing and the Fire Service, replied on behalf of the Government. He acknowledged there were procedural failures that contributed to the murder. However, Rory Stewart, the Minister of Justice had already provided Ian Lucas reassurance that any issues about the case had been addressed and there was no need for an inquiry into it. On 26 June 2018, there was a further Parliamentary debate titled 'North Wales Police and Nicholas Churton'. On 12 March 2019 and 14 May 2019 there were further mentions of the case in the House of Commons.

== Member of Parliament accusations of being mislead ==
The IPCC completed a separate investigation into the complaints made by Ian Lucas, the Member of Parliament for Wrexham, that he was misled by Mark Polin, the Chief Constable of North Wales Police. The IPCC reported that it had found no evidence he had been deliberately misled. In November 2019, Ian Lucas stated that he disagreed with the IPCC findings, and consequently, Arfon Jones, the North Wales Police Crime Commissioner, said he was "pursuing a personal vendetta against the former chief constable and impugning his integrity with such distasteful relish".
