= Reading Borough Police =

Defunct British territorial police force

Reading Borough Police was a police force for the borough of Reading in the United Kingdom. The force was created on 21 February 1836, at which time it had a strength of 30 constables, two sergeants and two inspectors. Towards the end of the 19th century, Reading Borough Police had increased in size to 62 officers. However, the local population had risen to around 60,500, which meant one officer for every 1,000 inhabitants. By the time of the First World War the force had an establishment of 113 officers, however, due to military service only 30 officers were patrolling Reading.

The first chief constable was Henry Houlton, a sergeant from the Metropolitan Police, who was appointed in 1839.

In 1968, Reading Borough Police were amalgamated with Berkshire Constabulary, Buckinghamshire Constabulary, Oxford City Police, and Oxfordshire Constabulary to form the Thames Valley Constabulary, later known as Thames Valley Police.

== Officers killed in the line of duty ==
- Detective Constable John Hutchinson, died 5 November 1904, aged 30. Drowned when fell down a culvert at night whilst on patrol with a colleague.
- Police Constable Rex Jupp, died 10 November 1943, aged 24. Killed by enemy action whilst on patrol during an air raid.
