= Newbury Borough Police =

Defunct police force in England

Newbury Borough Police, formed as a result of the Municipal Corporations Act 1835, operated in the Borough of Newbury, county of Berkshire, England until 1875, when the force was voluntarily amalgamated into Berkshire Constabulary. Today, the area is policed by the successor to Berkshire Constabulary, Thames Valley Police.
