= Buckinghamshire Constabulary =

Defunct British territorial police force

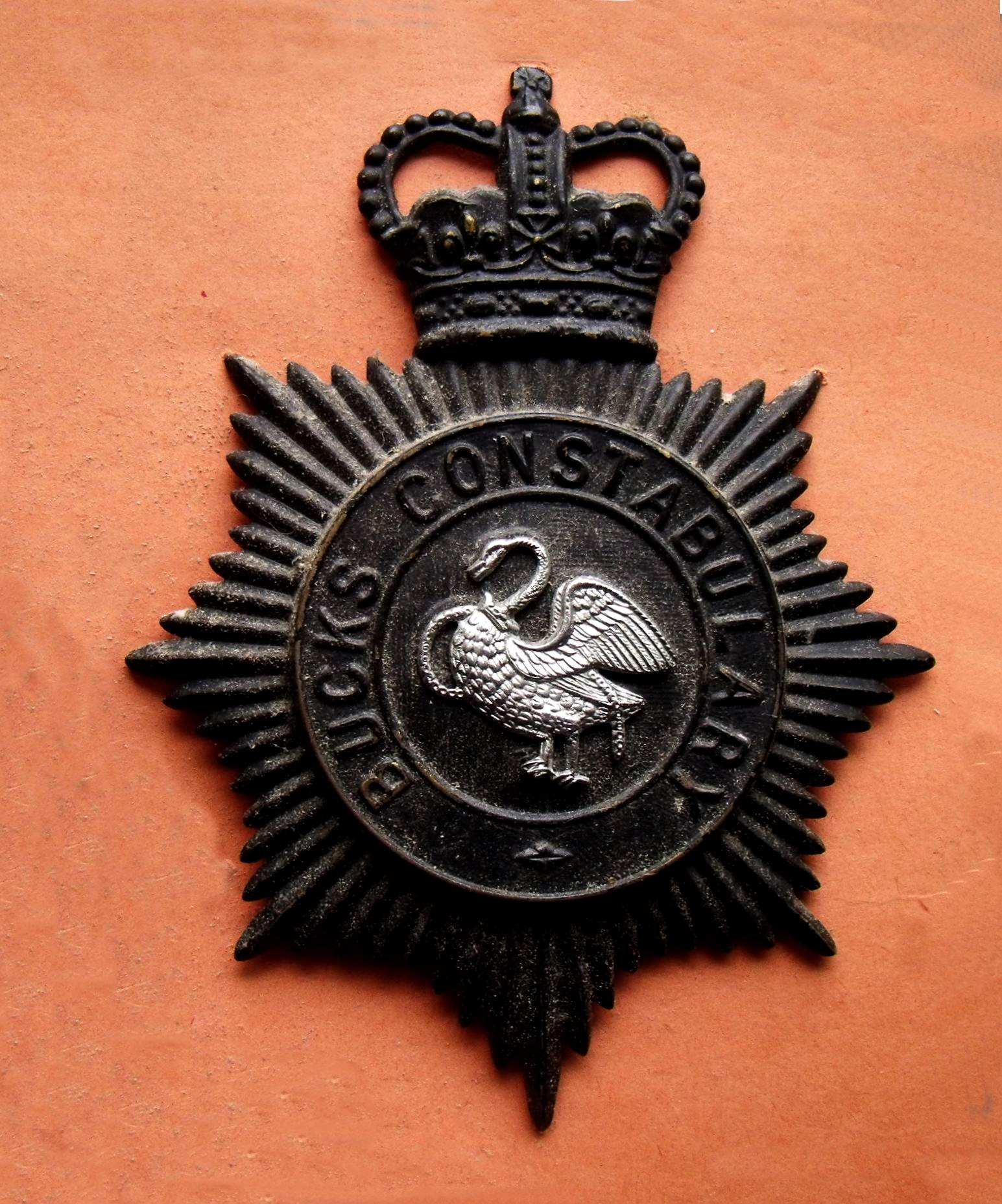
Cap badge of the Buckinghamshire Constabulary

Buckinghamshire Constabulary was the Home Office police force for the county of Buckinghamshire, England, until 1968.

Buckinghamshire Constabulary was established 6 February 1857. At establishment it had a strength of 102 officers. In 1868, prior to a national police pay structure, a newly recruited constable had a weekly net wage of 14s 1d which was 3 shillings a week less than constables in Staffordshire.

It later absorbed Buckingham Borough Police 1 April 1889 and Chepping Wycombe Borough Police on 1 April 1947. In 1965, it had an establishment of 738 and an actual strength of 672.

On 1 April 1968, Thames Valley Constabulary was formed by the amalgamation of Buckinghamshire Constabulary, Berkshire Constabulary, Oxford City Police, Oxfordshire Constabulary and Reading Borough Police. At the point of amalgamation the constabulary had a strength of 1,042 police officers.

Chief Constables

Chief Constables were:

- 1857–1867 : Captain Willoughby Harcourt Carter
- 1867–1896 : Captain John Charles Tyrwhitt-Drake
- 1896–1928 : Major Otway Mayne
- 1928–1953 : Colonel Sir Thomas Richard Pennefather Warren, 8th Baronet, CBE
- 1953–1968 : Brigadier John Cheney

== See also ==
- List of defunct law enforcement agencies in the United Kingdom
