= Merionethshire Constabulary =

Police force in Wales (1856–1950)

Agency overview
- Formed: 1856
- Dissolved: 1 October 1950

Jurisdictional structure
- Operations jurisdiction: Merionethshire, Wales, United Kingdom
- General nature: Civilian police

Merionethshire Constabulary was the Home Office police force for the county of Merionethshire, Wales from 1856 until 1950.

== History ==
The Constabulary was formed in 1856, under the County and Borough Police Act 1856, to replace the existing parish constables responsible for enforcing the law in local areas. The Constabulary was arranged into divisions or districts, including Aberdovey, Bala, Barmouth, Blaenau Ffestiniog, Corris, Corwen, Dinas Mawddwy, Dolgellau, Dyffryn, Harlech, Llwyngwril, Maentwrog, Pennal, Penrhyndeudraeth, Towyn and Trawsfynydd.

Under the Police Act 1946, it amalgamated with Anglesey Constabulary and Caernarvonshire Constabulary to form the Gwynedd Constabulary in 1950, which was later renamed North Wales Police in 1974. The Constabulary's archives are held at Gwynedd Archives.

== Chief Constables ==
- 1856–1880 Howell Hedd Lloyd Clough
- 1880–1883 Thomas Ellis
- 1883–1907 Thomas William Best
- 1907–1911 Thomas Jones
- 1911–1950 Richard Jones

== See also ==
- North Wales Police
