= Berkshire Constabulary =

Defunct British territorial police force

Berkshire Constabulary is a former Home Office police force which was responsible for policing the county of Berkshire in Southern England. Berkshire Constabulary was merged with four other adjacent police forces in 1968 to form the Thames Valley Constabulary, later known as Thames Valley Police.

Formed in 1856, the Constabulary was headquartered near Forbury Gardens in Reading, until it moved in 1952 to Sulhamstead House (then called the "White House"), purchased by the Berkshire County Council five years earlier for £53,000. The house is currently the Thames Valley Police Training College and Thames Valley Police Museum.

Berkshire Constabulary subsumed several smaller police forces during its existence, including the Abingdon Borough Police, Maidenhead Borough Police, Newbury Borough Police, Wallingford Borough Police and Wantage Borough Police. The Windsor Borough Police remained an independent force until 1947.

In 1965, Berkshire Constabulary had an establishment of 603 and an actual strength of 480.

On 1 April 1968 Thames Valley Constabulary was formed by amalgamating Berkshire Constabulary with Buckinghamshire Constabulary, the Oxford City Police, the Oxfordshire Constabulary and the Reading Borough Police.

== Chief Constables ==
- 1856–1863 : Colonel James Fraser
- 1863–1902 : Colonel Adam Blandy
- 1902–1932 : Lieutenant-Colonel Arthur Faulconer Poulton
- 1932–1953 : Commander the Hon. Humphry Legge
- 1954–1958 : John Lovegrove Waldron
- 1958–1968 : Thomas Charles Birkett Hodgson (later Chief Constable of the Thames Valley Police)
- 1968 : Merged with other forces to form Thames Valley Constabulary

== See also ==
List of defunct law enforcement agencies in the United Kingdom
