= Thames Valley Police =

English territorial police force

- Logo

- Badge
- Abbreviation: TVP
- Motto: Sit pax in valle tamesis Let there be peace in the Thames Valley

Agency overview
- Formed: 1 April 1968; 58 years ago
- Preceding agencies: Buckinghamshire Constabulary; Reading Borough Police; Oxfordshire Constabulary; Berkshire Constabulary; Oxford City Police
- Annual budget: £448.9 million (2020/21)

Jurisdictional structure
- Operations jurisdiction: Berkshire, Buckinghamshire and Oxfordshire, United Kingdom
- Map of Thames Valley Police's jurisdiction
- Area: 2,218 square miles (5,740 km^{2})
- Population: 2.42 million
- Legal jurisdiction: England and Wales
- General nature: Local civilian police

Operational structure
- Overseen by: His Majesty's Inspectorate of Constabulary and Fire & Rescue Services; Independent Office for Police Conduct
- Headquarters: Kidlington, Oxfordshire
- Police officers: 5,189 (Alongside 185 special constables) (April 2025 to March 2026)
- PCSOs: 255 (March 2026)
- Police and Crime Commissioner responsible: Matthew Barber
- Agency executive: Jason Hogg, Chief Constable
- Local Policing Areas: 11

Facilities
- Stations: 48
- Custody centres: 8

Website
- www.thamesvalley.police.uk

Thames Valley Police is the territorial police force responsible for policing the Thames Valley region, covering the counties of Berkshire, Buckinghamshire and Oxfordshire in South East England. It is the largest non-metropolitan police force in England and Wales, covering 2,218 square miles (5,740 km^{2}) and a population of 2.42 million people.

== History ==
Prior to the Municipal Corporations Act 1835 there were ancient ways of keeping law and order through Parish constables or quasi police bodies who conducted a wide range of duties. Modern policing in Thames Valley can be traced back to the 1835 act when a number of boroughs set up police forces. For example Newbury Borough Police were operating as a small police force soon after the passing of the Act. The force was one of around twenty borough forces that were later amalgamated with their county police force. These were Buckinghamshire Constabulary, Oxfordshire Constabulary, Berkshire Constabulary, Reading Borough Police and Oxford City Police founded in 1857, 1857, 1856, 1836 and 1868 respectively. Under the Police Act 1964 these five forces were amalgamated on 1 April 1968 to form the Thames Valley Constabulary.

Thames Valley Police has changed its name only once in its own history in 1971, from Thames Valley Constabulary to Thames Valley Police.

Thames Valley Police's motto in Latin is Sit pax in valle tamesis meaning 'Let there be Peace in the Thames Valley', their slogan is 'Reducing crime, disorder and fear'. The Thames Valley Police shield is made up of features from the shields of its five founding constabularies including a blue river depicting the Thames river and five crowns palisado depicting the five founding forces. The stag is a symbol of Berkshire, the ox a symbol of Oxfordshire and the swan a symbol of Buckinghamshire. Together they represent the counties of the force area.

=== Chief constables ===
- Thomas Hodgson (1968–1970)
- David Holdsworth (1970–1978)
- Peter Imbert (1979–1985)
- Colin Smith (1985–1991)
- Charles Pollard (1991–2002)
- Peter Neyroud (2002–2007)
- Sara Thornton (2007–2015)
- Francis Habgood (2015–2019)
- John Campbell (2019–2023)
- Jason Hogg (2023–present)

== Governance ==
Thames Valley Police is overseen by a locally elected Thames Valley Police and Crime Commissioner. The incumbent commissioner is Matthew Barber, a Conservative Party candidate elected in May 2021. The police and crime commissioner is scrutinised by the Thames Valley Police and Crime Panel.

Thames Valley was previously overseen by a police authority consisting of 19 members, made up of councillors, members from unitary authorities, independents and a magistrate.

== Organisation ==
In April 2011 the force adopted a local policing model and was split into twelve local policing areas (LPAs), each led by a Superintendent or Chief Superintendent. These consist of one or two local authority areas. The LPAs in turn are split into a number of "neighbourhoods" based on wards and parishes.

=== Local Policing Areas ===
- Milton Keynes
- Aylesbury Vale
- Cherwell and West Oxfordshire
- Oxford
- South Oxfordshire and Vale of White Horse
- South Buckinghamshire
- Slough
- Windsor and Maidenhead
- Bracknell and Wokingham
- Reading
- West Berkshire
- Kidlington

Each area is responsible for delivering response policing, neighbourhood policing teams, and local investigative units including a tasking, priority crime and Criminal Investigation Department (CID). Other functions that used to be held at a local level are now delivered at force headquarters level using a shared service approach, with resources deployed as required around the force area.

=== Force Headquarters Teams ===
A number of teams are run from force headquarters and their staff are deployed at various locations around the area:

- Major Investigation Team
- Control and Communications
- Police Dog Section
- Counter Terrorism Unit
- Intelligence Agency

== Operations ==
=== Neighbourhood Policing Team (NHPT) ===
Each LPA is sub-divided into neighbourhood wards, which are covered by a dedicated policing team that works together with the local community and partners to tackle local priorities and community crimes. NHPTs are typically conduct high-visibility patrols in their local areas, engaging with the community and solving issues affecting them.

=== Incident Crime & Response (ICR) ===
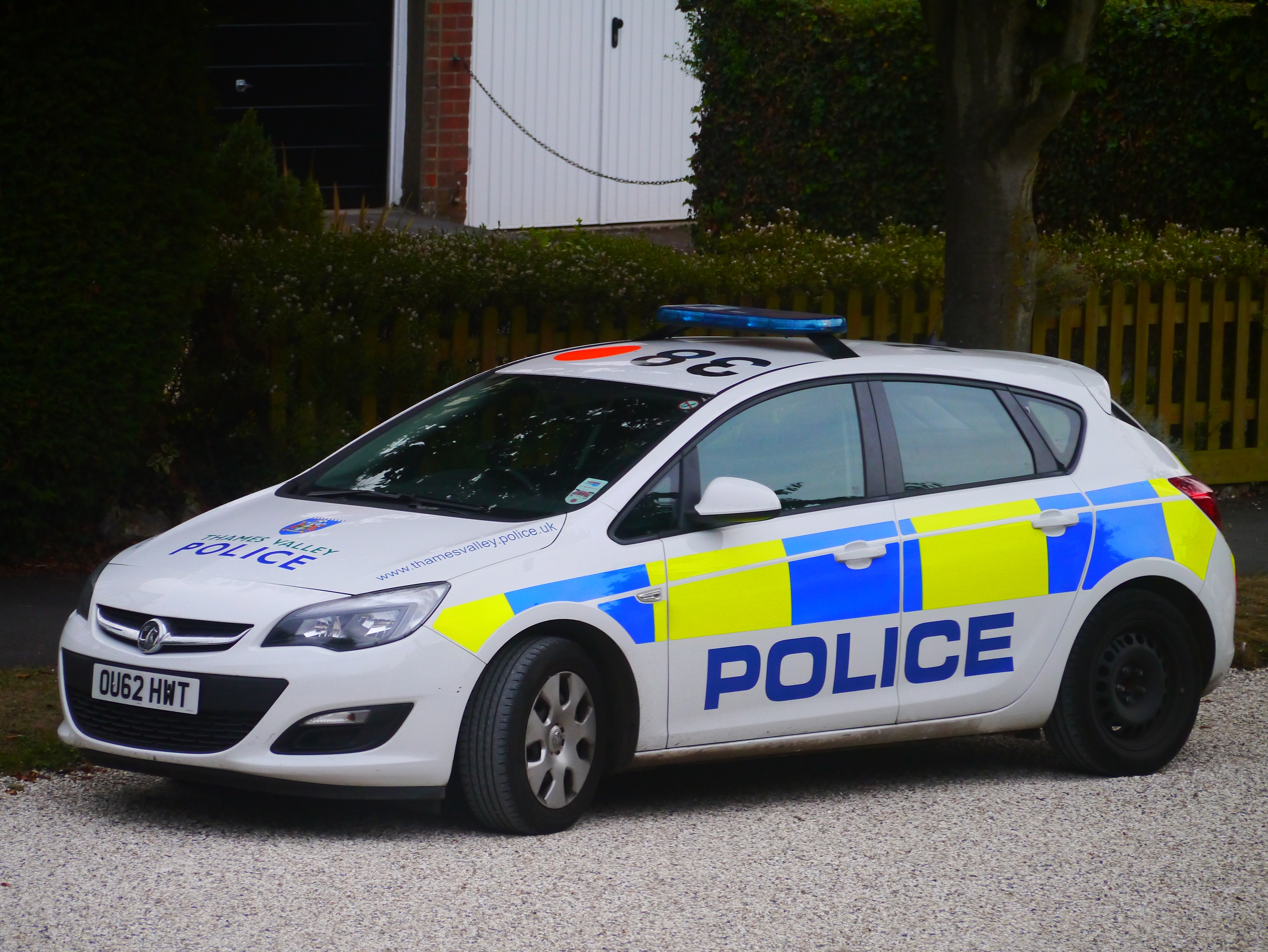
A Vauxhall Astra police car in Tilehurst

Frontline response officers work out of patrol bases in the force area and are tasked with patrolling and responding to 999 calls. Officers also conduct investigations into the calls they attend. These officers are often issued with the TASER X2; however, they are moving towards the newer modelled Taser 7. ICR officers may be tasked to patrol high crime areas for an increased police presence or to conduct follow-up investigations.

=== Dog Section ===
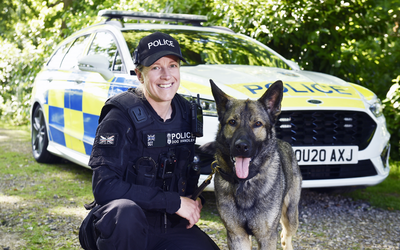
Thames Valley Police Dog Handler Sergeant Emma Dainty

Thames Valley Police have approximately 52 operational police dogs. The dogs are mostly donated from the RSPCA or public, and are trained at the Force Training Centre. They usually serve until they are 8 years old, receiving refresher training every year, and then living with their handler after retirement. They are part of the Joint Operations Unit with Hampshire Police. The dog section operates with marked and unmarked Mitsubishi Outlanders and Ford Mondeo estates.

=== Roads Policing Unit (RPU) ===
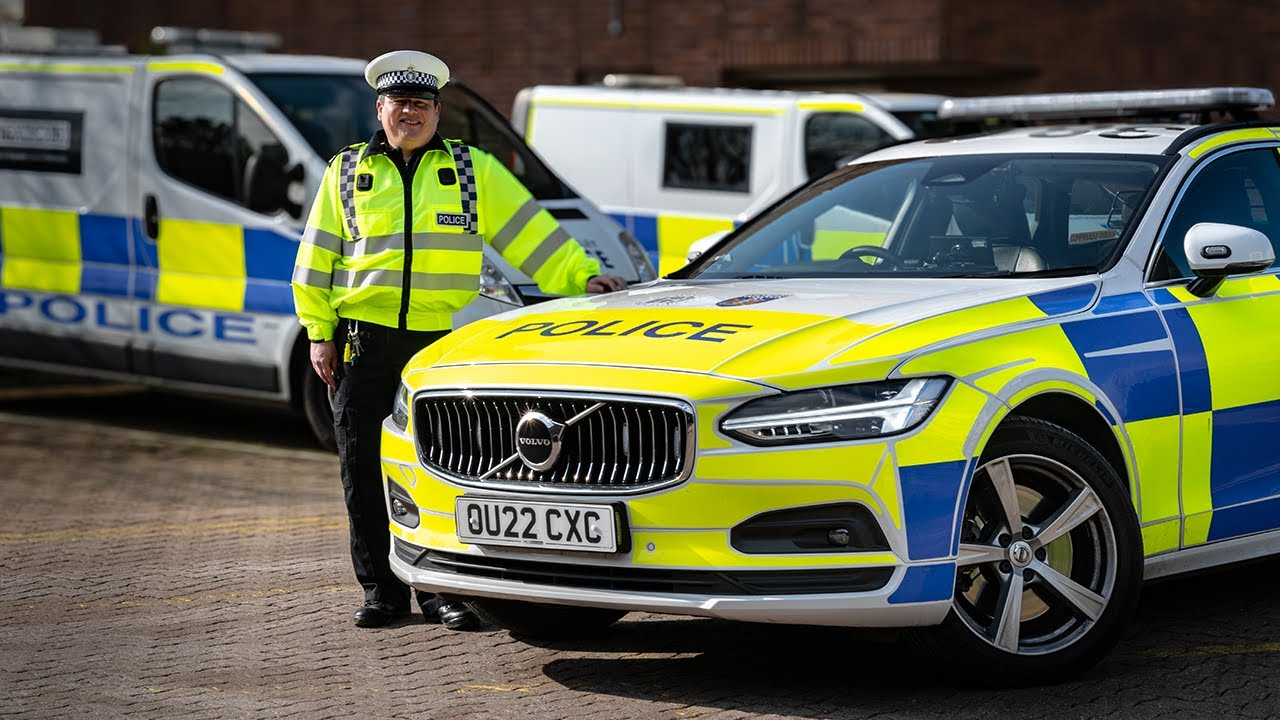
TVP RPU V90

Thames Valley Police patrols 196 miles (315 km) of motorways, the most of any police force in the UK. This includes the M1, M4, M40, A329(M), A404(M) and M25, as well as many other 'A' route roads including the A43.

These units are based at 6 geographical traffic bases - Milton Keynes, Taplow, Three Mile Cross (Reading), Bicester, Amersham and Abingdon. Roads Policing in Thames Valley is part of the Joint Operations Unit which works together with Hampshire Constabulary's Roads Policing Unit.

=== Armed Response Unit (ARU) ===
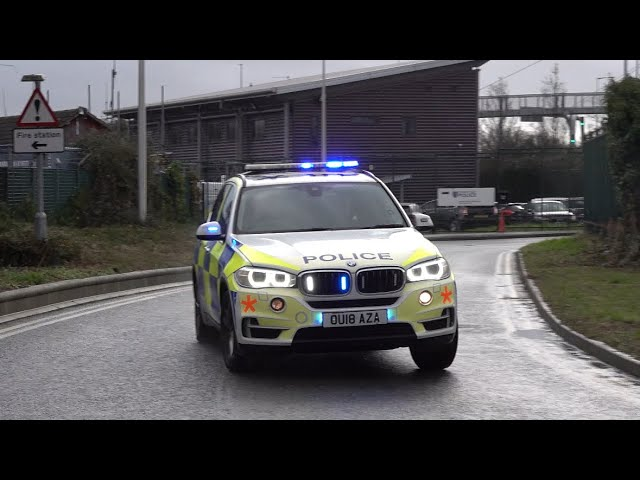
Thames Valley Police Armed Response Vehicle

Thames Valley Police's Armed Response Unit is a 24/7 unit that responds to major and serious crimes where firearms may be involved. This unit is shared with Hampshire Police as part of the Joint Operations Unit.

The training facility is at Sulhamstead with a state of the art firearms range. The unit mostly shares the traffic bases within the force.

=== Pro-Active Team ===
This team featured in the TV show Road Wars.

This unit is part of Roads Policing and mainly uses unmarked cars across the force area. Instead of just responding to incidents, the unit uses a proactive approach by actively looking for criminals and catching them in the act, as well as patrolling areas based on intelligence.

The team works in a number of areas including Forced Method of Entry, targeted intelligence and specialist surveillance of criminals both covertly and overtly.

=== Air Operations Unit ===
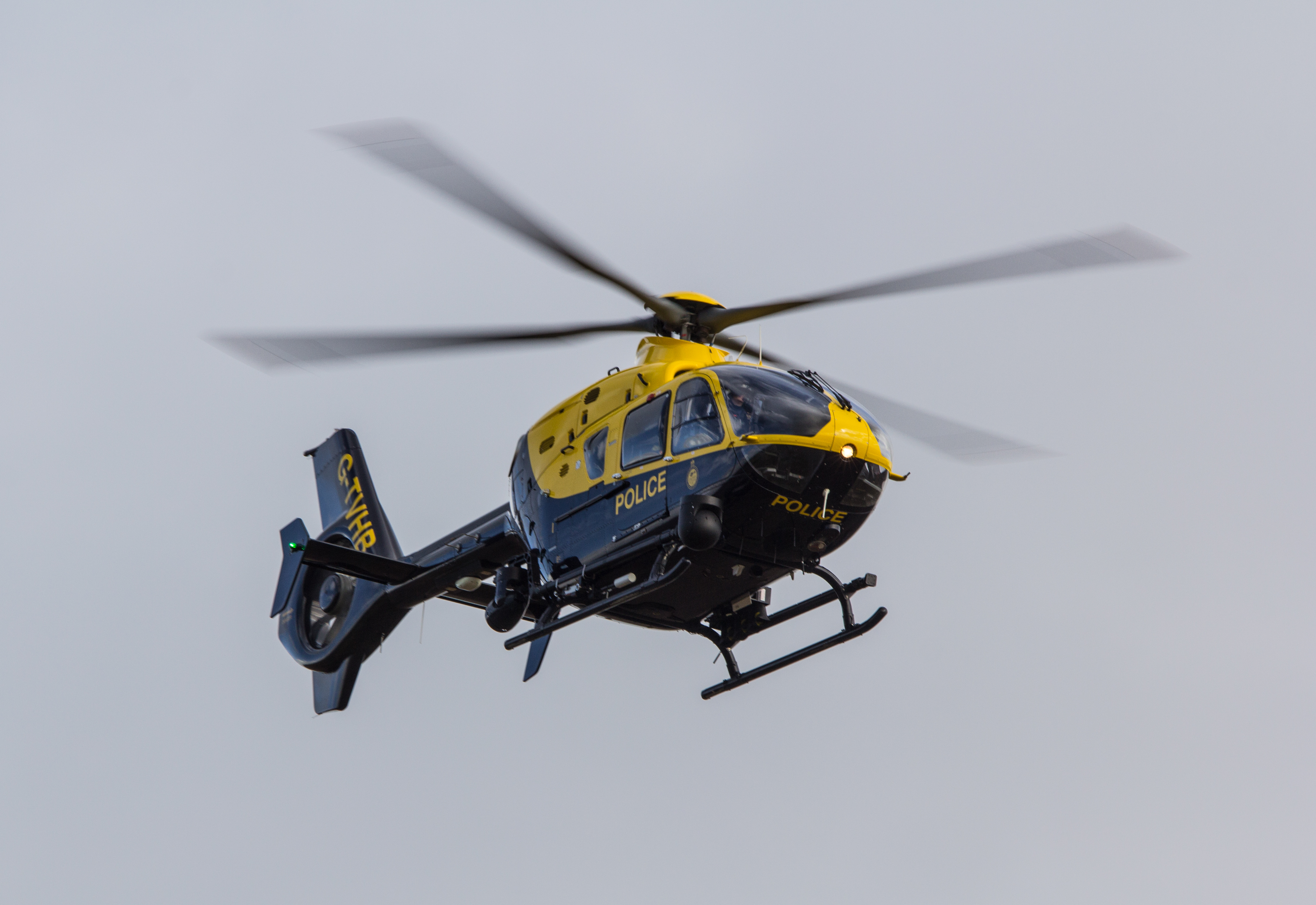
Since transfer to the National Police Air Service, G-TVHB continues to service the Thames Valley Police area from its base at RAF Benson

The Air Support Unit was officially created in 1982, but the use of helicopters in Thames Valley goes back to 1963, when Oxford City Police experimented with a Brantly helicopter with a dog basket attached to the skids. Thames Valley Police rented helicopters for use on special occasions in the 1970s and '80s. The unit was founded in 1982 when part-time daylight flights were routinely contracted and eight Sergeants were transferred from Traffic and Operations to ASU. In 1986, the unit was moved to RAF Abingdon.

In 1988, the department became a full-time operational unit, only the third in the country at the time, and a sergeant and two police constables were seconded to the unit as observers. Throughout this time, the helicopters and pilots were chartered from commercial companies.

In 1996, Thames Valley Police, Bedfordshire Police and Hertfordshire Constabulary amalgamated air support resources and founded the Chiltern Air Support Unit, having received funding in 1995 to buy a second helicopter. The alliance is recognised to have started unofficially in 1992, when Thames Valley would sell flying time to its nearby forces. Helicopters were based at RAF Henlow and RAF Benson, providing support 24/7, with night-time cover from at least one base.

Since 2012, the management of police air-support nationally has moved to the National Police Air Service (NPAS). G-TVHB continues to be based at RAF Benson, whilst the Henlow base was closed and helicopter relocated elsewhere by NPAS.

=== Search and Recovery Unit ===
Founded in 1956 as the Underwater Search Unit of Berkshire Constabulary and transferred to Thames Valley Police under a new name, the unit today is made up of one sergeant and seven constables and respond to around 350 operations each year.

The unit are involved in a variety of searching operations in river, underwater, underground, and cliff face conditions, searching for bodies, explosives, drugs, property, contraband and firearms and environments that can be affected by Chemical, Biological, Radioactive and Nuclear radiation.

=== Marine Support Unit ===
The Marine Support Unit carries out regular patrols of the Thames Valley and Hampshire's waterways, as well as covering special events including Henley Royal Regatta and Reading Festival.

=== Mounted Section ===
The Thames Valley Mounted Branch based at Milton Keynes Police Station. The unit has nine police horses. The unit is responsible for preventing equine crime, assisting in searches of rural areas, and mainly maintaining public order at demonstrations and sporting events, including the four football grounds in Thames Valley, as well as conducting deployments in Hampshire.

=== Public Order Department ===
Based in Heyford Park, formerly RAF Upper Heyford, in Oxfordshire. The POD is responsible for providing tactical support during spontaneous or pre-planned events that may result in public disorder. This includes sporting events such as football matches and Royal Ascot, music festivals such as Reading Festival, and lawful demonstrations.

=== Protection Group ===
Thames Valley Police has the largest non-Metropolitan Police Service operated Protection Group. This specialist department are responsible for guarding multiple fixed locations and protecting any visiting parties that require special attention. They also supply an Armed Support Vehicle to support the static sites and deal with spontaneous incidents. The officers in the unit are required to pass stringent testing, they are Authorised Firearms Officers and also trained in advanced driving, advanced first aid, method of entry amongst many other specialist skills.

=== Counter Terrorism Unit (CTPSE) ===
Thames Valley Police's Counter Terrorist Unit is responsible for responding to any search related or explosive or terrorist incident, working with Protection Group to guard anyone deemed to be at risk and with dog section to locate the explosive. The unit has four explosive ordnance disposal advisors.

=== South East Regional Organised Crime Unit (SEROCU) ===
The South East Regional Organised Crime Unit (SEROCU) is responsible for delivering specialist and niche capabilities to Thames Valley Police, Hampshire Constabulary, Surrey Police and Sussex Police, including investigating cyber and complex, organised crime.

== Locations ==
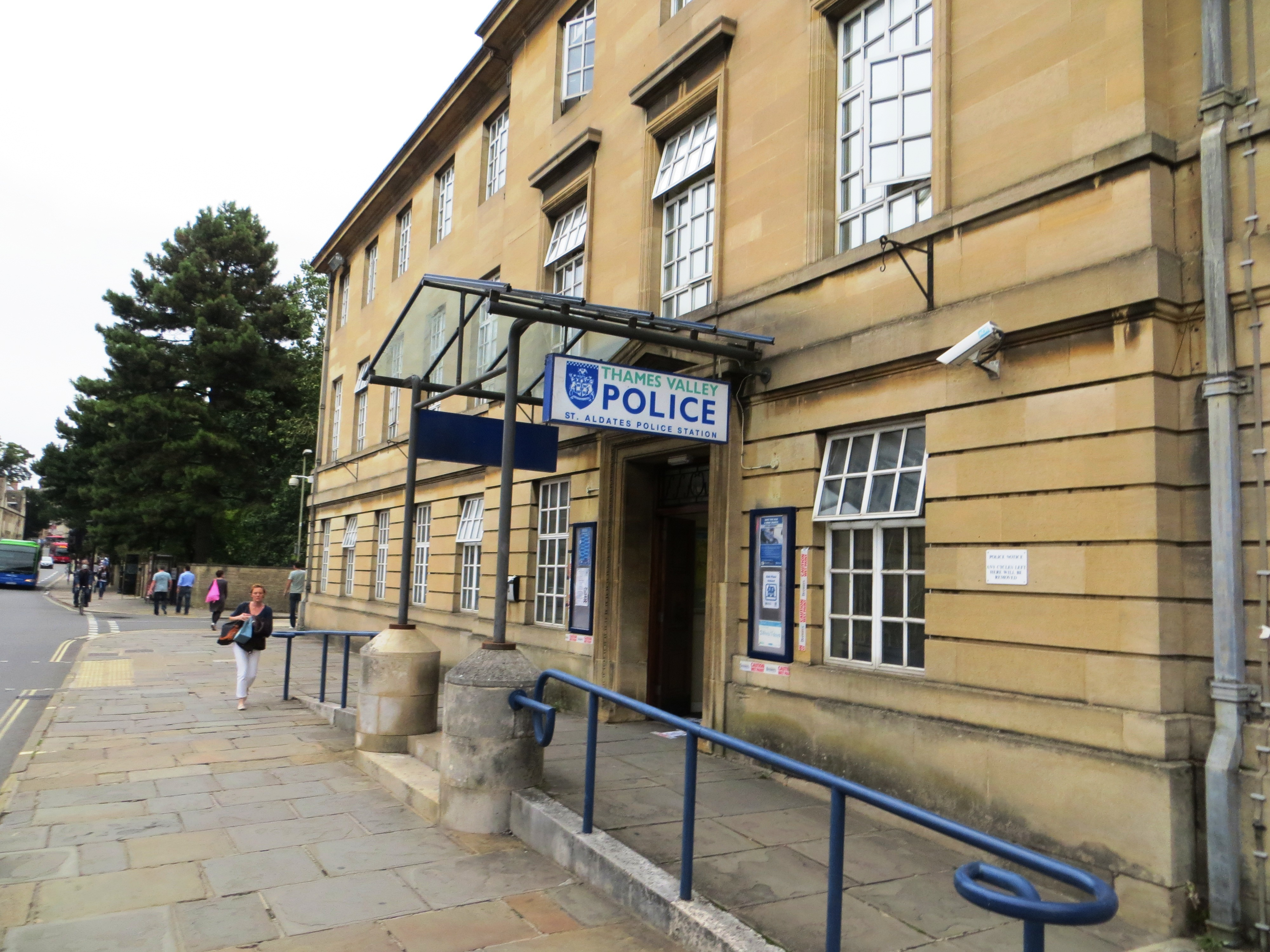
Oxford Police Station

The headquarters of Thames Valley Police is at Oxford Road, Kidlington, Oxfordshire. Thames Valley Police has 48 police stations, with 16 front counters open to the public.

The force is covered by two control rooms, one in Abingdon, and one in Milton Keynes.

The three police contact centres were formed in 2003, following the closure of local control rooms, to support the newly formed control rooms in Abingdon and Milton Keynes. They are located at the force headquarters in Kidlington, and separate teams within the Abingdon and Milton Keynes control rooms. The contact centres handle all emergency, non-emergency and enquiry calls from the public.

Sulhamstead House in Sulhamstead, near Reading, is the Force Training Centre. It also houses the Thames Valley Police Museum, as well as operational units and fleet workshops.

Upper Heyford Park serves as the force's Public Order Department base and training centre.

There are also several roads policing bases at strategic locations around the force at Abingdon, Bicester, Taplow, Amersham, Milton Keynes, and Three Mile Cross. Many of these also feature armouries for the Armed Response Unit.

== Presentation ==
=== Headgear ===
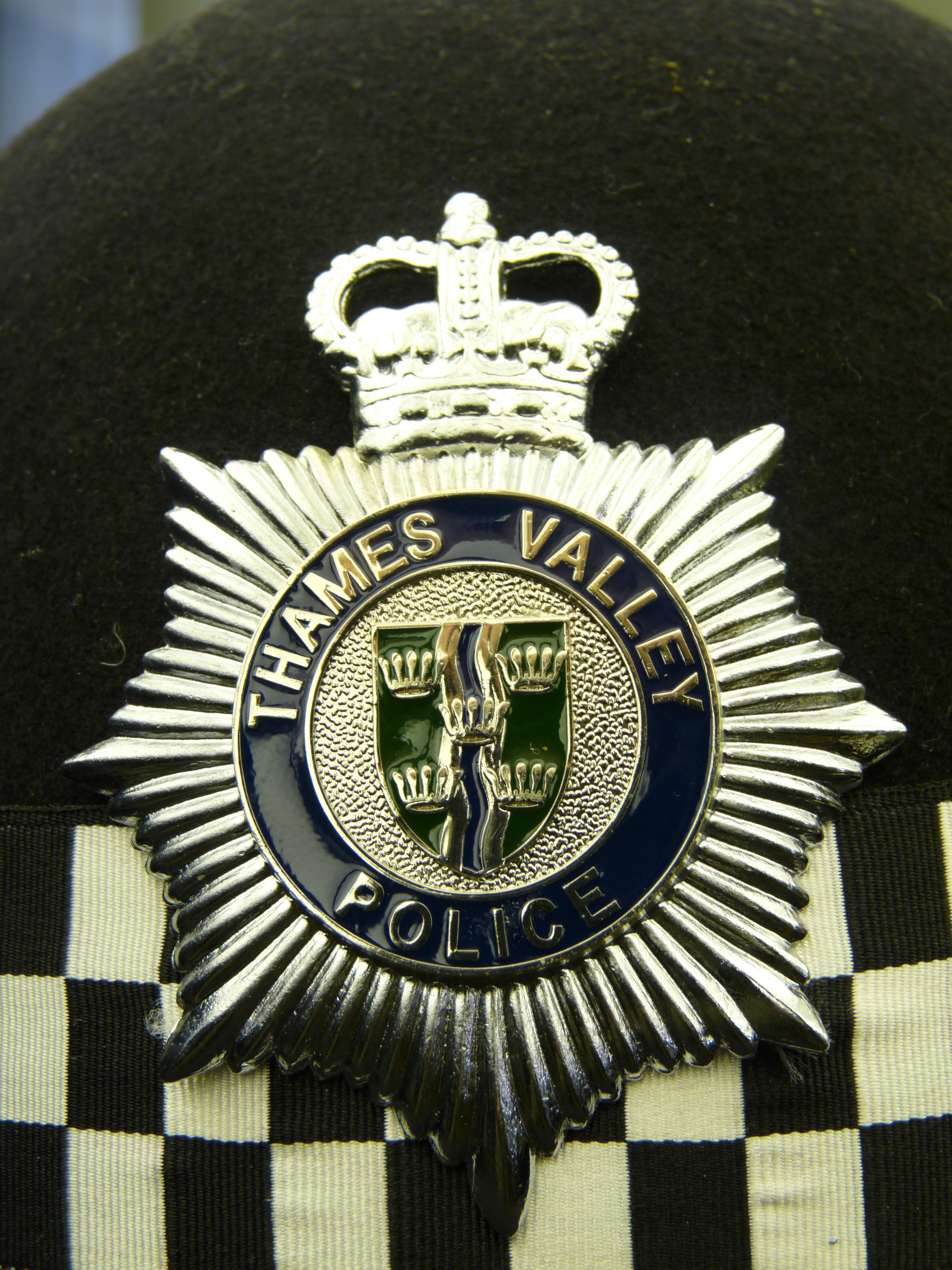
The Thames Valley Police cap badge

Male officers typically can wear a flat cap or traditional custodian helmet, while females are issued the bowler hat. The custodian helmet was dropped for practicality and cost reasons in 2009, but was reintroduced in 2018, yet is typically used by officers conducting foot patrols only. Traffic officers wear either a white flat cap or bowler hat.

In 2009, Thames Valley Police proposed to be the first force to introduce the use of baseball caps as a primary mode of headgear. After trials were conducted the proposal was dropped as being "a step too far from the professional image of the force".

Other units tend to wear police baseball caps, with other specialist headgear worn accordingly.

=== Uniform ===
Officers wear a short- or long-sleeve, black wicking top under their body armour, and black uniform trousers with cargo pockets. Soft-shell and high-visibility jackets are also issued to all officers. Epaulettes feature the rank and shoulder number of an officer. Officers the rank of inspector or above may wear white shirts, with the force badge worn on the left of their chest.

Formal dress comprises an open-necked tunic, with a white shirt or blouse and tie for both male and female officers. All officers wear peaked caps and their rank on their epaulettes. The No.1 uniform is accompanied by black boots or shoes and occasionally gloves.

The operational uniform, until 2009, consisted of traditional white shirt and tie. This was dropped when it was deemed to be impractical and outdated – not withstanding the retention of this uniform by other forces and the almost universal retention of the helmet. However, starting with the Royal Wedding of the Duke and Duchess of Sussex, TVP has started issuing the custodian helmet again.

Police Community Support Officers (PCSOs) wear a similar uniform to police officers on patrol, but consisting of a blue wicking top and single blue band on flat caps. Other staff may wear wicking tops or white shirts, depending on role.

=== Equipment ===
Police officers

- Sepura SC21 TETRA digital radios, encrypted on the Airwave network
- Reveal D-Series body-worn video camera
- Monadnock Autolock 22" baton
- Captor360 PAVA spray
- TCH rigid handcuffs
- Leg restraints
- A first aid, major trauma and resuscitation kit

PCSOs carry only a radio, BWV and paperwork required for their role.

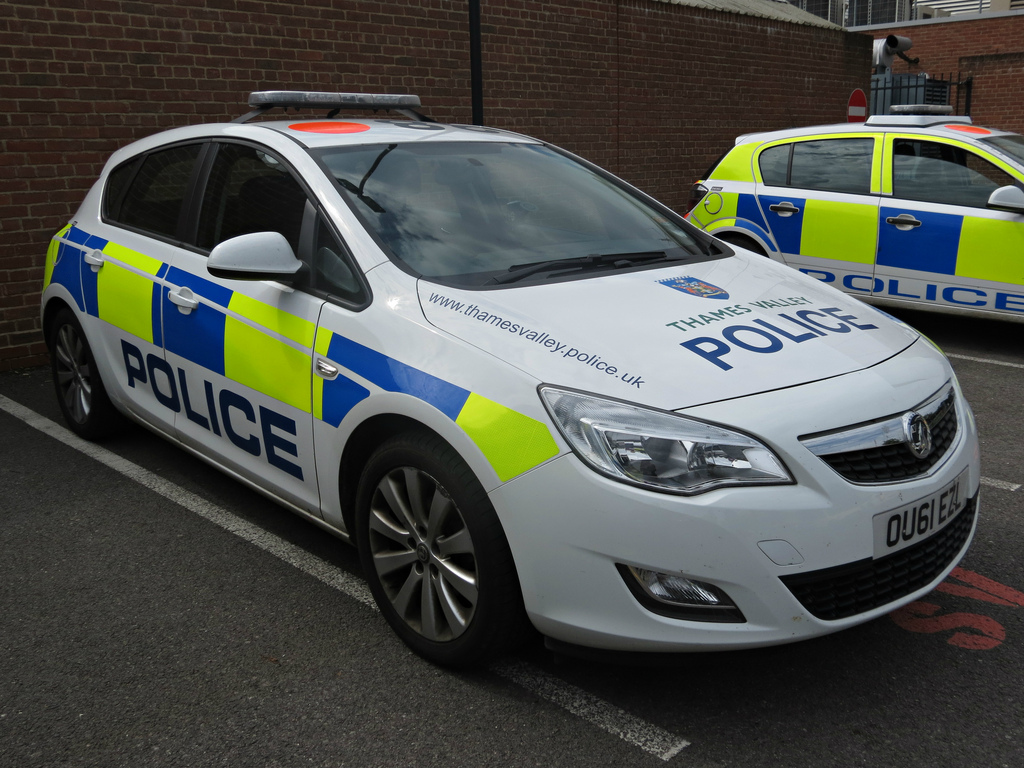
A Vauxhall Astra in half-batternburg markings

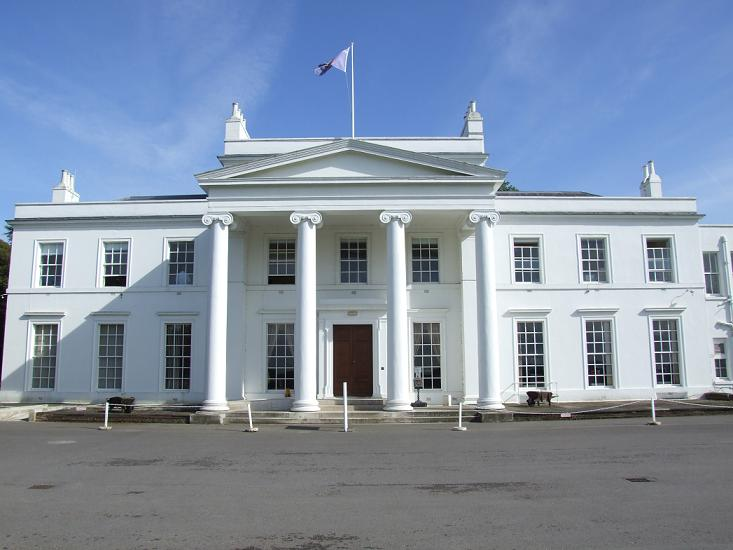
The 'White House' at the Sulhamstead Training Centre also houses the Thames Valley Police Museum.

Police vehicles contain a variety of equipment, which can include Arnold batons, shields, traffic cones, road signs, breathalysers, stingers, speed guns, ANPR cameras and more.

=== Livery ===
Marked vehicles use the modern yellow and blue retro-reflective Battenburg markings on operational vehicles, as well as the Thames Valley Police shield and website link. Some semi-marked cars are used by Neighbourhood Policing Teams, which have only plain Thames Valley Police markings on the back and sides.

Thames Valley Police stopped using the "jam sandwich" police car markings between 2000 and 2005 when Battenburg markings were adopted and implemented.

== Strength and recruitment ==
Thames Valley Police employs 7,900 people and 908 volunteers, of which 4,250 are warranted police officers, more than 500 are police community support officers (PCSOs) and 3,150 are civilian staff. Of the 908 volunteers, 500 are police support volunteers (PSV) and 280 are warranted special constables.

Training for new recruits in Thames Valley is held at the Force Training Centre, Sulhamstead. Officers attend a (sometimes residential) training course, and are then deployed for continued tutoring at their posting. Officers will achieve independent patrol status once on area, usually within four months of completing initial training. PCSOs receive 18 weeks of training at Sulhamstead. Special constables see between six and seven months of training at weekends, with mandatory online training in between. Special constables will achieve fit for independent patrol status, usually within one year, but this is dependent on the number of tours of duty.

Recruits receive their uniform and kit in the first week of training. Warrant cards are issued at attestation, where new officers swear their oath at the start of the second day of training.

=== Future of Thames Valley Police ===
In a report published by HM Inspectorate of Constabulary in July 2011, the impact on the number of police officers and staff partly owing to the reduction to Thames Valley Police's budget following the comprehensive spending review is as follows:

	Police officers	Police staff	PCSOs	Total
31 March 2010 (actual)	4,268	2,855	500	7,623
31 March 2015 (proposed)	4,034	2,541	453	7,028

March 2010 figures exclude 166 officers and 145 staff who were paid through the Thames Valley payroll system but were seconded to national and regional duties and were externally funded.

== Performance ==
=== His Majesty's Inspectorate of Constabulary ===
A report from March 2010 by HM Inspectorate of Constabulary marked Thames Valley Police as 'fair' on local crime and policing, 'fair' on protection from serious harm and 'fair' on confidence and satisfaction.

In detail, Thames Valley was awarded only one "excellent", for reducing road death and injury. It was "fair" in all other categories except "solving crime" and "comparative satisfaction of BME community" and "low/medium" for "number of police officers and PCSOs". It was praised for its 14% reduction in burglary after "Operation Breaker" in July 2009.

=== Independent Police Complaints Commission ===
In 2008–2009, the number of complaints recorded decreased by 2% but an increase of 8% above the previous year's national average. The number of allegations recorded increased by 23% and 11% above the previous year's national average. Thames Valley Police received 947 complaints and 1903 allegations, the national average being 338 per 1000 officers. TVP has 372, and TVP is just above 369 per 1000 officers, the average from a group of similar forces.

Of allegations, 23% were "failure or neglect in duty", 19% were "incivility, impoliteness and intolerance", 14% "assault", 4% were "discrimination" and 1% were "breach of PACE Code A".

Of the 1903 allegations, 51% were investigated, 36% were locally resolved, 6% were withdrawn, 7% were dispensed and 0% were discontinued. Of the 51% allegations investigated, 13% were substantiated and 87% were unsubstantiated.

Thames Valley Police investigates the greatest number of allegations compared to its peer forces; its investigation rate is 15% higher than the national average. Its use of "local resolution" has dropped 12% since 2005–2006. Thames Valley has fewer allegations that are withdrawn, dispensed or discontinued.

=== PEEL inspection 2022 ===
His Majesty's Inspectorate of Constabulary and Fire & Rescue Services (HMICFRS) conducts a periodic police effectiveness, efficiency and legitimacy (PEEL) inspection of each police service's performance. In its latest PEEL inspection, Thames Valley Police was rated as follows:

	Outstanding	Good	Adequate	Requires Improvement	Inadequate
2021/22 rating		Recording data about crime; Treatment of the public; Managing offenders	Preventing crime; Investigating crime; Protecting vulnerable people; Developing a positive workplace	Responding to the public; Good use of resources	

== Controversy ==
=== Firearms training incident ===
On 30 May 2007 at Thames Valley Police headquarters in Kidlington whilst teaching a half-day course on firearms, PC David Micklethwaite demonstrated a Magnum .44 revolver which he had mistakenly loaded with live rounds. He pointed the gun at Keith Tilbury, a police phone operator attending the course, and fired the gun, almost killing Tilbury.

The firearms instructor was reported to have failed the qualification at a Metropolitan Police training course, but TVP decided he would pass their less stringent test and was therefore suitable to teach the lesson, despite not having been provided with additional training since failing the Metropolitan Police course. The instructor was told to cover the lesson at short notice and accidentally picked up a live round from the force's armoury instead of dummy rounds. This mistake occurred owing to both live and dummy rounds both being kept in the same Quality Street tin.

Keith Tilbury underwent immediate surgery to his bowel, kidney, lung and liver. In court, it was said he was unlikely to work again.

Thames Valley Police pleaded guilty to breaching regulations; they were fined £40,000 and £25,000 for legal costs. Constable Micklethwaite initially denied any wrongdoing, but later admitted to breaching the Health and Safety at Work etc. Act 1974. PC Micklethwaite was not charged with misconduct because he retired from the Thames Valley Police before misconduct proceedings could be completed.

=== Underage PCSOs ===
In 2007, Thames Valley Police admitted to being one of five UK forces that had employed Police Community Support Officers that were aged 16. This is not illegal, as the minimum age limit of 18 applies to Constables, not PCSOs. However, concerns were raised that this represented "policing on the cheap" as candidates aged under 18 have a different wage scale and could cost £10,000 less per annum. It was also feared that the officers were being placed in unreasonable danger as PCSOs and police have been attacked in the past.

=== Discrimination incident ===
In August 2024, the Thames Valley Police were found to have unlawfully "directly discriminated" against three white officers two years prior by passing them over for a promotion owing to higher-ups secretly wanting to promote only someone from a racial minority instead, automatically promoting an underqualified Asian sergeant into the position of Detective-Inspector in order to boost the diversity of its senior staff, without properly considering the said white British officers for the same position.

== Budget cuts ==
=== Proposed merger ===
Proposals made by the Home Secretary on 20 March 2006 would see the force stay as a single strategic police force for the area, a merger with Hampshire Constabulary having been rejected.

=== Budget deficit ===
In 2010, it was reported that Thames Valley Police had to make savings of £52 million over the next four years. Chief Constable Thornton said that they would have to "cut back on all non-essential activity". £347 million of savings were identified including back office cuts and efficiency measures, as well as cutting officers numbers by 10%, meaning 800 officers.

== In the media ==
The fictional Inspector Morse, the main character in 13 novels by Colin Dexter and 33 television episodes by ITV, works for Thames Valley Police, but in the spin-off series, Lewis, the force is referred to as Oxfordshire Police. The prequel spin-off, Endeavour, covers Morse's early years in Oxford City Police and takes its merger into Thames Valley Police as a continuing theme.

In 1982, the BBC broadcast a nine-part series by Roger Graef and Charles Stewart entitled Police, which showed a fly-on-the-wall account of Thames Valley's E Division based in Reading. This featured the rather demeaning treatment of a female victim of rape which was much discussed in the media at the time.

Between 2003 and 2008 a Sky1 programme, Road Wars, followed the Roads Policing Proactive and Problem Solving Team while they carried out their duties. The series followed a select group of officers on duty.

Following the killing of Andrew Harper in service in 2019, The Killing of PC Harper: A Widow's Fight for Justice aired in 2022.

== Other activities ==
=== IT resource merger ===
Thames Valley Police and Hampshire Police authorities have agreed to share ICT support and infrastructure, with all IT workers now employees of Thames Valley Police. This will also include the Isle of Wight, a division of Hampshire Police. The partnership in Information Technology is the first of its kind in the country.

=== Chiltern Transport Consortium ===
Thames Valley Police is the lead force in the Chiltern Transport Consortium (CTC), providing the fleet and maintenance for 6 different police forces. Members include the British Transport Police, Civil Nuclear Constabulary, Bedfordshire Police, Hertfordshire Police and Cambridgeshire Police.

=== Thames Valley Police Museum ===
The Thames Valley Police Museum is located within Sulhamstead House, known locally as the 'White House', at Sulhamstead in the English county of Berkshire. The site was formerly the headquarters of the Berkshire Constabulary, and is now the training centre for the Thames Valley Police. The museum is open by appointment and on Wednesdays 12-1pm.

The museum includes displays on the history of Thames Valley Police and the five police forces that were amalgamated to form the force in 1968; the Buckinghamshire Constabulary, the Berkshire Constabulary, Oxford City Police, the Oxfordshire Constabulary and the Reading Borough Police. The museum's collections include items from the Great Train Robbery of 1963, uniforms, equipment, medals, photographs, scenes of crime evidence, and occurrence and charge books.

In 2006, the exhibition space of the museum was renovated. Since September 2017, the museum has been temporarily closed prior to relocation.

== Officers killed in the line of duty ==
The Police Roll of Honour Trust and Police Memorial Trust list and commemorate all British police officers killed in the line of duty. Since its establishment in 1984, the Police Memorial Trust has erected 50 memorials nationally to some of those officers.

The following officers of Thames Valley Police are listed by the Police Roll of Honour Trust as having died attempting to prevent, stop or solve a crime, since the beginning of the 20th century:

- Inspector Francis John East, 1944 (fatally injured when pushed off a vehicle by a suspect)
- PC William John Payne, 1949 (collapsed and died after pursuing a burglar)
- DC Brian Moss, 1953 (fell through a roof while searching for suspects)
- Inspector James Roy Bradley, 1967 (run over by a suspect car at a roadblock)
- DC Ian Coward, 1971 (shot nine times attempting to arrest an armed suspect; posthumously awarded the Queen's Police Medal)
- WPC Joanne Mary Cochran, 1984 (fatally injured when her vehicle crashed during a police pursuit)
- PC Roger Brereton, 1987 (shot in the Hungerford massacre)
- PC Gareth Browning, 2017 (run over by a suspect car in 2013, later died in hospital)
- PC James Dixon, 2017 (fatally injured in a road traffic collision whilst on a training exercise)
- PC Andrew Harper, 2019 (fatally injured whilst at the scene of a reported burglary)

== Coat of arms ==
Coat of arms of Thames Valley Police
Notes Granted 7 September 1971 Crest On a wreath Argent and Azure, a swan rousant proper, gorged with a saxon crown Gules, supporting by the dexter foot a sword, point upwards, in its scabbard Or. Escutcheon Vert, on a pale wavy Argent, a pallet wavy Azure, over all five crowns palisado in saltire Or. Supporters On the dexter a stag Gules, attired and unguled Or and on the sinister an ox Gules, armed Or, each gorged with a collar paly Argent and Azure, with a chain affixed thereto and reflexed over the back Or. Motto 'Sit Pax In Valle Tamesis'

== See also ==
- Chiltern Air Support Unit
- Policing in the United Kingdom
- List of law enforcement agencies in the United Kingdom
- Thames Valley
