= Air Navigation Act 1920 =

Act of the Parliament of the United Kingdom

Air Navigation Act 1920 (Note: Section 20(1).)
- Act of Parliament
- Parliament of the United Kingdom
- Long title: An Act to enable effect to be given to a Convention for regulating Air Navigation, and to make further provision for the control and regulation of aviation.
- Citation: 10 & 11 Geo. 5. c. 80
- Territorial extent: England and Wales; Scotland; Ireland; (Note: Section 19.)

Dates
- Royal assent: 23 December 1920
- Commencement: 23 December 1920 (Note: The Acts of Parliament (Commencement) Act 1793.)
- Repealed: 24 November 1949
Other legislation
Repeals/revokes	Aerial Navigation Act 1911; Aerial Navigation Act 1913
Amended by	Local Government Act 1933; Local Government (Scotland) Act 1947
Repealed by	Civil Aviation Act 1949

Status: Repealed

Text of statute as originally enacted

The Air Navigation Act 1920 (10 & 11 Geo. 5. c. 80) was an act of the Parliament of the United Kingdom which gave the British government the authority to control air navigation.

An identically named act was passed by the Commonwealth Parliament in Australia, to bring into force the provision of the Paris Convention and the newly created International Commission for Air Navigation (ICAN).

== History of the Australian act ==
The first attempts at international regulation of air navigation were made in 1910 in Paris, when representatives of 19 European countries attended an International Air Conference. The meeting was abandoned when agreement on the contents could not be reached. At a peace conference after World War I the regulation of air navigation was once again discussed. Because of the advances made in aviation during the war, all attending members agreed to hold an International Conference to draw up rules and international regulations for air traffic. The Paris Convention was signed on 13 October 1919.

On 25 February 1919, an Australian Air Traffic Committee under the Council of Defence met for the first time.

Major General Legge, chairman of the committee, noted that "there should be only one regulatory air authority for Australia, working under a single legislature." At an Australian Premiers' Conference in May 1920 the Australian Prime Minister Billy Hughes's recommendation that "each State should refer to the Commonwealth [of Australia] the control of air navigation, but in a way as to reserve to the States the right to own and use aircraft for the purpose of government departments and the police powers of the State" was carried, and the Australian Parliament passed the Air Navigation Act in the widest possible terms.

The Australian Air Navigation Act of 1920 was granted assent on 2 December 1920, gazetted on 11 February 1921, came into force on 28 March 1921 and became law on 28 June 1921. Regulations under the Act provided for the registration of aircraft, licensing of aerodromes, licensing of personnel, periodic inspection and maintenance of aircraft, and rules of the air.

== List of acts and adaptions ==
Australia
  - Air Navigation Act 1920 (No. 50 of 1920)
  - Air Navigation Act 1936 (Act No. 93 of 1936)
  - Air Navigation Act 1947 (Act No. 6 of 1947) - ratification of the Convention on International Civil Aviation (Chicago Convention of 1944)
  - Air Navigation Act (No.2) 1947 (Act No. 89 of 1947)
  - Statute Law Revision Act 1950 (Act No. 80 of 1950)
  - Air Navigation Act 1960 (Act No. 39 of 1960)
  - Act No. 72 of 1961-Air Navigation Act 1961
  - Act No. 8 of 1963-Air Navigation Act 1963
  - Act No. 93 of 1966-Statute Law Revision (Decimal Currency) Act 1966
  - Act No. 79 of 1971-Air Navigation Act 1971
  - Act No. 130 of 1973-Air Navigation Act 1973
  - Act No. 216 of 1973-Statute Law Revision Act 1973
  - Act No. 216 of 1973-Air Navigation Act 1920 Act No. 50 of 1920 as amended
  - Act No. 11 of 1991-Air Navigation Act 1920 Act No. 50 of 1920 as amended
  - Act No. 82 of 1992-Air Navigation Act 1920 Act No. 50 of 1920 as amended
  - Act No. 5 of 1994-Air Navigation Act 1920 Act No. 50 of 1920 as amended
  - Act No. 64 of 1994-Air Navigation Act 1920 Act No. 50 of 1920 as amended
  - Act No. 168 of 1994-Air Navigation Act 1920 Act No. 50 of 1920 as amended
  - Act No. 82 of 1995-Air Navigation Act 1920 Act No. 50 of 1920 as amended
  - Act No. 95 of 1995-Air Navigation Act 1920 Act No. 50 of 1920 as amended
  - Act No. 174 of 1995-Air Navigation Act 1920 Act No. 50 of 1920 as amended
  - Act No. 30 of 1997-Air Navigation Act 1920 Act No. 50 of 1920 as amended
  - Act No. 95 of 1998-Air Navigation Act 1920 Act No. 50 of 1920 as amended
  - Act No. 156 of 1999-Air Navigation Act 1920 Act No. 50 of 1920 as amended
  - Act No. 48 of 2000-Air Navigation Act 1920 Act No. 50 of 1920 as amended
  - Act No. 55 of 2001-Air Navigation Act 1920 Act No. 50 of 1920 as amended
  - Act No. 143 of 2001-Air Navigation Act 1920 Act No. 50 of 1920 as amended
  - Act No. 8 of 2002-Air Navigation Act 1920 Act No. 50 of 1920 as amended
  - Act No. 63 of 2002-Air Navigation Act 1920 Act No. 50 of 1920 as amended
  - Act No. 143 of 2002-Air Navigation Act 1920 Act No. 50 of 1920 as amended
  - Act No. 19 of 2003-Air Navigation Act 1920 Act No. 50 of 1920 as amended
  - Act No. 83 of 2003-Air Navigation Act 1920 Act No. 50 of 1920 as amended
  - Act No. 140 of 2003-Air Navigation Act 1920 Act No. 50 of 1920 as amended
  - Act No. 9 of 2004-Air Navigation Act 1920 Act No. 50 of 1920 as amended
  - Act No. 64 of 2004-Air Navigation Act 1920 Act No. 50 of 1920 as amended
  - Act No. 149 of 2004-Air Navigation Act 1920 Act No. 50 of 1920 as amended
  - Act No. 109 of 2006-Air Navigation Act 1920 Act No. 50 of 1920 as amended
  - Act No. 21 of 2007-Air Navigation Act 1920 Act No. 50 of 1920 as amended
  - Act No. 87 of 2008-Air Navigation Act 1920 Act No. 50 of 1920 as amended
  - Air Navigation Act 1920 as amended to 5 March 2016
United Kingdom
  - Air Navigation Act 1920 (10 & 11 Geo. 5. c. 80)
  - Air Transport (Subsidy Agreements) Act 1930 (20 & 21 Geo. 5. c. 30)
  - Air Navigation Act 1936 (26 Geo. 5 & 1 Edw. 8. c. 44)
  - Air Navigation (Financial Provisions) Act 1938 (1 & 2 Geo. 6. c. 33)
  - Air Ministry (Heston and Kenley Aerodromes Extension) Act 1939 (2 & 3 Geo. 6. c. 59)
  - Air Navigation Act 1947 (10 & 11 Geo. 6. c. 18)
  - Airways Corporations Act 1949 (12, 13 & 14 Geo. 6. c. 57)
  - Air Corporations Act 1949 (12, 13 & 14 Geo. 6. c. 91)
  - Air Corporations Act 1953 (2 & 3 Eliz. 2. c. 7)
  - Air Corporations Act 1956 (5 & 6 Eliz. 2. c. 3)
  - Air Corporations Act 1960 (8 & 9 Eliz. 2. c. 13)
  - Civil Aviation (Licensing) Act 1960 (8 & 9 Eliz. 2. c. 38)
  - Air Corporations Act 1962 (11 & 12 Eliz. 2. c. 5)
  - Airports Authority Act 1965 (c. 16)
  - Airports Authority Act 1965 (c. 16)
  - Air Corporations Act 1966 (c. 11)
  - Air Corporations Act 1967 (c. 33)
  - Air Corporations Act 1969 (c. 43)
  - Civil Aviation Act 1971 (c. 75)
  - Air Travel Reserve Fund Act 1975 (c. 36)
  - Airports Authority Act 1975 (c. 78)
  - Aircraft and Shipbuilding Industries Act 1977 (c. 3)
  - Aviation Security Act 1982 (c. 36)
  - Airports Act 1986 (c. 31)
  - Aviation (Offences) Act 2003 (c. 19)
Ireland
  - 5/1928 — Air Navigation Act, 1920, Adaptation Order, 1928.
  - 21/1928 — The Air Navigation (Investigation of Accidents) Regulations, 1928.
  - 68/1928 — Air Navigation (No. 1.) Regulations, 1928.
  - 34/1929 — Air Navigation (No. 2) Regulations, 1929.
  - 26/1930 — Air Navigation (General) Regulations, 1930.
  - 53/1932 — Air Navigation (Eucharistic Congress) Regulations, 1932.
  - 245/1934 — Air Navigation (Amendment) Regulations, 1934.
  - 360/1934 — Air Navigation (Collection of Fees) Order, 1934.
  - 361/1934 — Air Navigation (Collection of Fees) Regulations, 1934.
  - 560/1935 — Air Navigation (International Lines) Order, 1935.
  - Air Navigation and Transport Act, 1936
  - 108/1938 — Air Navigation (Amendment) Regulations, 1938.
  - 263/1938 — Air Navigation (Aircraft Equipment) Directions, 1938.
  - 53/1939 — Air Navigation (Amendment) Regulations, 1939.
  - 47/1940 — Air Navigation (Amendment) Regulations, 1940.
  - Air Navigation and Transport (Amendment) Act, 1942
  - 288/1943 — Air Navigation (Investigation of Accidents) Regulations, 1928 (Amendment) Regulations, 1943.
  - 347/1943 — Air Navigation (Amendment) Regulations, 1943.
  - 376/1946 — Air Navigation and Transport Act, 1936 (Part X) (Appointed Day) Order, 1946.
  - Air Navigation and Transport Act, 1946
  - 1/1947 — Air Navigation and Transport Act, 1936 (Aviation Business) Regulations, 1947.
  - 113/1947 — Air Navigation (General Regulations) Order, 1947.
  - 116/1947 — Customs-Free Airport (Air Navigation) Regulations, 1947.
  - 132/1947 — Air Navigation (Navigators' Licences) Directions 1947.
  - 433/1947 — Air Navigation and Transport (Compulsory Acquisition of Land) (No. 1) Order, 1947.
  - 96/1949 — Air Navigation (Rules of the Air) Order, 1949.
  - Air Navigation and Transport Act, 1950
  - 31/1951 — Air Navigation (Amendment) Order, 1951.
  - 33/1951 — Air Navigation (Personnel Licensing) Order, 1951.
  - 65/1951 — Air Navigation (Personnel Licensing) (Fees) Order, 1951.
  - 403/1951 — Air Navigation and Transport (Compulsory Acquisition of Land) Order, 1951.
  - 74/1952 — Air Navigation (Foreign Military Aircraft) Order, 1952.
  - 96/1953 — Air Navigation (Operations) Order, 1953.
  - 228/1953 — Air Navigation and Transport Act, 1936 (Aviation Business) Regulations, 1953.
  - 353/1953 — Air Navigation (Personnel Licensing) (Amendment) Order, 1953.
  - 118/1954 — Air Navigation (Operations) Order, 1953 (Amendment) Order, 1954.
  - 110/1956 — Air Navigation and Transport Act, 1936 (Non-International Carriage) Order, 1956.
  - 19/1957 — Air Navigation (Investigation of Accidents) Regulations, 1957.
  - Air Navigation and Transport Act, 1959
  - Air Navigation and Transport (No. 2) Act, 1959
  - Air Navigation and Transport Act, 1961
  - 187/1962 — Air Navigation (General) Regulations, 1930 (Amendment) Order, 1962.
  - 7/1963 — Air Navigation (Rules of the Air) Order, 1963.
  - No. 65/1963 — Air Navigation (Fees) Order, 1963.
  - 87/1963 — Air Navigation and Transport (Fares and Rates) Order, 1963.
  - 88/1963 — Air Navigation (Nationality and Registration of Aircraft) Order, 1963.
  - 120/1963 — Air Navigation and Transport (Fares and Rates) Order, 1963 (Revocation) Order, 1963.
  - 148/1963 — Air Navigation and Transport Act, 1959 (Parts III and IV and Schedule) (Commencement) Order, 1963.
  - Air Navigation (Eurocontrol) Act, 1963
  - 140/1964 — Air Navigation (Operations) Order, 1964.
  - 141/1964 — Air Navigation (Airworthiness of Aircraft) Order, 1964.
  - 264/1964 — Air Navigation and Transport Act, 1936 (Non-International Carriage) Order, 1964
  - 291/1964 — Air Navigation (Eurocontrol) Act, 1963 (Commencement) Order, 1964.
  - Air Navigation and Transport Act, 1965
  - 94/1966 — Air Navigation and Transport Act, 1965 (Commencement of Sections 6 and 19) Order, 1966.
  - 96/1966 — Air Navigation and Transport Act, 1965, (Section 8) Regulations, 1966.
  - 165/1966 — Air Navigation (Personnel Licensing) Order, 1966.
  - 273/1966 — Air Navigation (Rules of the Air) (Amendment) Order, 1966.
  - 272/1967 — Air Navigation (Rules of the Air) (Amendment) (No. 2) Order, 1967.
  - 26/1968 — Air Navigation (Rules of the Air) (Amendment) Order, 1968.
  - 134/1968 — Air Navigation (Definition of Aircraft) Order, 1968
  - 147/1969 — Air Navigation (Rules of the Air) (Amendment) Order, 1969.
  - 291/1970 — Air Navigation (Aerodromes and Visual Ground Aids) Order, 1970.
  - 290/1971 — Air Navigation (Eurocontrol) (Route Charges) Regulations, 1971.
  - Air Navigation (Eurocontrol) Act, 1971
  - 59/1972 — Air Navigation (Eurocontrol) (Route Charges) (Amendment) Regulations, 1972
  - 160/1972 — Air Navigation (Eurocontrol) (Route Charges) (Amendment) (No. 2) Regulations, 1972.
  - 280/1972 — Air Navigation (Noise Certification and Limitation) Order 1972.
  - 22/1973 — Air Navigation (Rules of the Air) Order, 1973.
  - 102/1973 — Air Navigation (Airworthiness of Aircraft) (Amendment) Order, 1973.
  - 187/1973 — Air Navigation (Noise Certification and Limitation) (Amendment) Order, 1973.
  - 214/1973 — Air Navigation (Eurocontrol) (Route Charges) (Amendment) Regulations, 1973.
  - 224/1973 — Air Navigation (Carriage of Munitions of War, Weapons and Dangerous Goods) Order, 1973.
  - 290/1973 — Air Navigation (Eurocontrol) (Route Charges) (Amendment) (No. 2) Regulations, 1973.
  - 327/1973 — Air Navigation (Eurocontrol) (Route Charges) (Amendment) (No. 3) Regulations, 1973.
  - 343/1973 — Air Navigation and Transport Act, 1973 (Commencement) Order, 1973.
  - Air Navigation and Transport Act, 1973
  - 18/1974 — Air Navigation (Rules of the Air) (Amendment) Order, 1974.
  - 7/1975 — Air Navigation (Rules of the Air) (Amendment) Order, 1975.
  - 249/1975 — Air Navigation (Eurocontrol) (Route Charges) (Amendment) Regulations, 1975.
  - Air Navigation and Transport Act, 1975
  - Air Navigation and Transport (No. 2) Act, 1975
  - 60/1976 — Air Navigation (Fees) Order, 1976.
  - 250/1976 — Air Navigation (Noise Certification and Limitation) Order 1976.
  - 83/1977 — Air Navigation (Eurocontrol) (Route Charges) (Amendment) Regulations, 1977.
  - 35/1978 — Air Navigation (Eurocontrol) (Route Charges) (Amendment) Regulations, 1978.
  - 76/1979 — Air Navigation (Eurocontrol) (Route Charges) (Amendment) Regulations, 1979.
  - 194/1979 — Air Navigation (Nationality and Registration of Aircraft) (Amendment) Order, 1979.
  - 335/1979 — Air Navigation (Fees) Order, 1979.
  - 78/1980 — Air Navigation (Eurocontrol) (Route Charges) Regulations, 1980.
  - 307/1980 — Air Navigation (Fees) Order, 1980.
  - 104/1981 — Air Navigation (Eurocontrol) (Route Charges) (Amendment) Regulations, 1981.
  - 343/1981 — Air Navigation (Eurocontrol) (Route Charges) (Amendment) (No. 2) Regulations, 1981.
  - 349/1981 — Air Navigation (Fees) Order, 1981.
  - 70/1982 — Air Navigation (Eurocontrol) (Route Charges) (Amendment) Regulations, 1982.
  - 307/1982 — Air Navigation (Eurocontrol) (Route Charges) (Amendment) (No. 2) Regulations, 1982.
  - 47/1983 — Air Navigation (Fees) Order, 1983.
  - 82/1983 — Air Navigation (Eurocontrol) (Route Charges) (Amendment) Regulations, 1983.
  - 418/1983 — Air Navigation (Eurocontrol) (Route Charges) (Amendment) (No. 2) Regulations, 1983.
  - Air Navigation (Eurocontrol) Act, 1983
  - 13/1984 — Air Navigation (Noise Certification and Limitation) Order, 1984.
  - 15/1984 — Air Navigation (Nationality and Registration of Aircraft) (Amendment) Order, 1984.
  - 106/1984 — Air Navigation (Fees) Order, 1984.
  - 2/1985 — District Court (Air Navigation (Eurocontrol) Acts, 1963 To 1983) Rules, 1984.
  - 243/1985 — Air Navigation (Eurocontrol) Order, 1985.
  - 261/1985 — Air Navigation (Fees) Order, 1985.
  - 434/1985 — Air Navigation (Eurocontrol) (No. 2) Order, 1985.
  - 435/1985 — Air Navigation (Eurocontrol) (Route Charges) (Amendment) Regulations, 1985.
  - 436/1985 — Air Navigation (Eurocontrol) Act, 1983 (Commencement) Order, 1985.
  - 62/1986 — Air Navigation (Operations) Order, 1986.
  - 229/1986 — Air Navigation and Transport (Preinspection) Act, 1986 (Competent Authority) Order, 1986.
  - Air Navigation and Transport (Preinspection) Act, 1986
  - 56/1988 — Air Navigation and Transport (Preinspection) Act, 1986 (Competent Authority) Order, 1988.
  - 284/1988 — Air Navigation (Protection Area) Order, 1988.
  - 342/1988 — Air Navigation (Personnel Licensing) (Amendment) Order, 1988.
  - Air Navigation and Transport Act, 1988
  - 114/1989 — Air Navigation (Protection Area) Order, 1989.
  - 130/1989 — Air Navigation (Carriage of Munitions of War, Weapons and Dangerous Goods) (Amendment) Order, 1989.
  - 165/1989 — Air Navigation and Transport (Compulsory Acquisition of Land) Order, 1989.
  - 322/1989 — Air Navigation (Transfer of Certain Functions and Duties of State of Registry of Aircraft) Order, 1989.
  - 346/1989 — Air Navigation (Aerodrome Radio Equipment) Order, 1989.
  - 362/1989 — Air Navigation (Eurocontrol) (Route Charges) Regulations, 1989.
  - 12/1990 — Air Navigation (Interception of Aircraft) Order, 1990.
  - 116/1990 — Air Navigation and Transport (Environmental Impact Assessment) Regulations, 1990.
  - 312/1990 — Air Navigation (Eurocontrol) (Route Charges) (Amendment) Regulations, 1990.
  - 321/1990 — Air Navigation (Fees) Order, 1990.
  - 52/1992 — Air Navigation (Rules of the Air) Order, 1992.
  - 205/1993 — Air Navigation (Protected Area) Order, 1993.
  - 323/1993 — Air Navigation and Transport Act, 1965 (Section 8) Regulations, 1993.
  - 324/1993 — Air Navigation and Transport Act, 1965 (Section 8) (No. 2) Regulations, 1993.
  - 325/1993 — Air Navigation (Air Operator Certificates) Order, 1993.
  - 74/1995 — Air Navigation (Fees) Order, 1995.
  - 170/1995 — Air Navigation (Designated Areas) Order, 1995.
  - 222/1995 — Air Navigation (Personnel Licensing) (Amendment) Order, 1995.
  - 49/1996 - Air Navigation (Fees) (Amendment) Order, 1996.
  - 50/1996 - Air Navigation (Personnel Licensing) (Amendment) Order, 1996.
  - 321/1996 - Air Navigation (Personnel Licensing) (Amendment) (No. 2) Order, 1996
  - 101/1997 - Air Navigation (Personnel Licensing) (Amendment) Order, 1997
  - 198/1997 - Air Navigation and Transport (Application of Regulations To State Aircraft) (Government) Order, 1997.
  - 205/1997 - Air Navigation (Notification and Investigation of Accidents and Incidents) Regulations, 1997.
  - 206/1997 - Air Navigation and Transport (Application of Regulations To State Aircraft) (Ministerial) Order, 1997.
  - 220/1997 - The Air Navigation (Operations) (Amendment) Order, 1997
  - Air Navigation and Transport (Amendment) Act, 1998
  - 326/1998 - Air Navigation and Transport (Amendment) Act, 1998 (Vesting Day) Order, 1998
  - 327/1998 - Air Navigation and Transport (Amendment) Act, 1998 (Commencement) Order, 1998
  - 21/1999 — Air Navigation (Personnel Licensing) (Amendment) Order, 1999
  - 159/1999 — Air Navigation (Personnel Licensing) (No. 2) (Amendment) Order, 1999.
  - 423/1999 — Irish Aviation Authority (En Route Obstacles To Air Navigation) Order, 1999.
  - 287/2000 — Air Navigation and Transport (Amendment) Act, 1998 (Aggregate Borrowings Limit Variation) Order, 2000.
  - 375/2000 — Air Navigation and Transport (Amendment) Act, 1998 (Aggregate Borrowings Limit Variation) (No. 2) Order, 2000
  - 627/2001 — Air Navigation and Transport (Indemnities) (State of Difficulty) Order, 2001.
  - Air Navigation and Transport (Indemnities) Act, 2001
  - 102/2002 — Air Navigation and Transport (Indemnities) (State of Difficulty) (Continuation) Order 2002
  - 162/2002 — Air Navigation and Transport (Indemnities) (State of Difficulty) (Continuation) (Number 2) Order 2002
  - 266/2002 — Air Navigation and Transport (Indemnities) (State of Difficulty) (Continuation) (Number 3) Order 2002
  - 319/2002 — Air Navigation and Transport (Indemnities) (State of Difficulty) (Continuation) (Number 4) Order 2002
  - 458/2002 — Air Navigation and Transport (Indemnities) (State of Difficulty) (Continuation) (Number 5) Order 2002
  - 246/2003 — Air Navigation and Transport (Amendment) Act 1998 (Aggregate Borrowings Limit Variation) Order 2003
  - 645/2003 — European Communities (Air Navigation and Transport Rules and Procedures For Noise Related Operating Restrictions At Airports) Regulations 2003
  - Air Navigation and Transport (International Conventions) Act 2004
  - Air Navigation and Transport (Indemnities) Act 2005
  - 161/2007 — Air Navigation and Transport (Amendment) Act 1998 (Aggregate Borrowings Limit Variation) Order 2007
  - 460/2009 — Air Navigation (Notification and Investigation of Accidents, Serious Incidents and Incidents) Regulations 2009
  - 390/2010 — Air Navigation and Transport (International Conventions) Act 2004 (Revision of Limits of Liability) Order 2010.
  - 515/2014 - Air Navigation and Transport (Amendment) Act 1998 (IAS Scheme Amendment) (Commencement) Order 2014.
Singapore
  - Act 11 of 1966—Air Navigation Act 1966
  - 1970 Revised Edition—Air Navigation Act (Chapter 87)
  - Act 12 of 1971—Tokyo Convention Act 1971
  - 1985 Revised Edition—Air Navigation Act (Chapter 6)
  - Act 164 of 1985—Air Navigation Order 1985
  - Act 32 of 1986—Statutes (Miscellaneous Amendments) Act 1986
  - Act 406 of 1988
  - Act 44 of 1989
  - Act 73 of 1989
  - Act 476 of 1989
  - Act 239 of 1990
  - Act 436 of 1990
  - 1990 Revised Edition — Air Navigation Order
  - Act 573 of 1991
  - Act 49 of 1992
  - Act 60 of 1992
  - Act 180 of 1992
  - Act 61 of 1993
  - Act 199 of 1993
  - Act 8 of 1994
  - Act 7 of 1997—Statutes (Miscellaneous Amendments) Act 1997
  - Act 67 of 1998—Air Navigation (Amendment) Order 1998
  - Act 28 of 2000—Statutes (Miscellaneous Amendments and Repeal) Act 2000
  - Act 325 of 2000—Air Navigation (Amendment) Order 2000
  - Act 384 of 2000—Air Navigation (Amendment No. 2) Order 2000
  - Act 166 of 2002—Air Navigation (Amendment) Order 2002
  - Act 4 of 2003—Customs (Amendment) Act 2003
  - Act 56 of 2003—Air Navigation (Amendment) Order 2003
  - Act 440 of 2003—Air Navigation (Amendment No. 2) Order 2003
  - Act 581 of 2003—Air Navigation (Amendment No. 3) Order 2003
  - Act 331 of 2005—Air Navigation (Amendment) Order 2005
  - Act 781 of 2005—Air Navigation (Amendment No. 2) Order 2005
  - Act 487 of 2006—Air Navigation (Amendment) Order 2006
  - Act 640 of 2006—Air Navigation (Amendment No. 2) Order 2006
  - Act 12 of 2007—Air Navigation (Amendment) Act 2007
  - Act 17 of 2009—Civil Aviation Authority of Singapore Act 2009
  - Act 299 of 2009—Air Navigation (Amendment) Order 2009
  - Act 278 of 2010—Air Navigation (Amendment) Order 2010
  - Act 423 of 2010—Air Navigation (Amendment No. 2) Order 2010
  - Act 729 of 2010—Air Navigation (Amendment No. 3) Order 2010
  - Act 162 of 2011—Air Navigation (Amendment) Order 2011
  - Act 570 of 2011—Air Navigation (Amendment No. 2) Order 2011
  - Act 124 of 2012—Air Navigation (Amendment) Order 2012
  - Act 617 of 2012—Air Navigation (Amendment No. 2) Order 2012
  - Act 348 of 2013—Air Navigation (Amendment) Order 2013
  - Act 10 of 2014—Air Navigation (Amendment) Act 2014
  - 2014 Revised Edition—Air Navigation Act (Chapter 6)
  - Act 21 of 2015—Air Navigation (Amendment) Order 2015

]

== Subsequent developments ==
The whole act was repealed by section 70(1) of, and the twelfth schedule to, Civil Aviation Act 1949 (12, 13 & 14 Geo. 6. c. 67), which came into force on 24 November 1949.

== See also ==
- Aerodrome
- Civil Aviation Safety Authority
- Chicago Convention on International Civil Aviation
