= Civil Aviation (Amendment) Act 1982 =

Act of the Parliament of the United Kingdom

Civil Aviation (Amendment) Act 1982 (Note: Section 5(1).)
- Act of Parliament
- Parliament of the United Kingdom
- Long title: An Act to make further provision with respect to the financial limits applying to the British Airports Authority and the British Airways Board; and to make amendments designed to facilitate, or otherwise desirable in connection with, the consolidation of certain enactments relating to civil aviation.
- Citation: 1982 c. 1
- Territorial extent: United Kingdom (Note: Section 5(2).)

Dates
- Royal assent: 2 February 1982
- Commencement: 2 February 1982 (Note: Section 4(b) of the Interpretation Act 1978.)
- Repealed: 22 July 2004

Other legislation
- Repealed by: Statute Law (Repeals) Act 2004
- Relates to: Civil Aviation Act 1982

Status: Repealed

Text of statute as originally enacted

Revised text of statute as amended

The Civil Aviation (Amendment) Act 1982 (c. 1) was an act of the Parliament of the United Kingdom that made further provision with respect to the financial limits applying to the British Airports Authority and the British Airways Board, and made amendments to facilitate the consolidation of certain enactments relating to civil aviation in the United Kingdom.

== Provisions ==
=== Repealed enactments ===
Section 4(3) of the act repealed 14 enactments, listed in schedule 2 to the act.

Enactments repealed by section 4(3)
Citation	Short title	Extent of repeal
12, 13 & 14 Geo. 6. c. 67	Civil Aviation Act 1949	In section 10(2)(d), the words "this Part of this Act or".
12, 13 & 14 Geo. 6. c. 67	Civil Aviation Act 1949	In section 19, subsections (6) and (8) and in subsection (9) the words "and the expression 'land' includes any right in or over land".
12, 13 & 14 Geo. 6. c. 67	Civil Aviation Act 1949	In section 23, subsection (1), in subsection (2) the words "also" and "otherwise than under the said Acts" and the words from "any estate" onwards, in subsection (3) the words from "In this subsection" onwards, in subsection (4) the word "adaptations" and the words "and exceptions", in subsection (7) the words from "This subsection shall" onwards and subsections (8), (9) and (10).
12, 13 & 14 Geo. 6. c. 67	Civil Aviation Act 1949	Section 24(10).
12, 13 & 14 Geo. 6. c. 67	Civil Aviation Act 1949	Section 25(7).
12, 13 & 14 Geo. 6. c. 67	Civil Aviation Act 1949	Section 29(4).
12, 13 & 14 Geo. 6. c. 67	Civil Aviation Act 1949	In section 31, subsections (2) and (6).
12, 13 & 14 Geo. 6. c. 67	Civil Aviation Act 1949	In section 33(5)(a), the words "under subsection (2) of section eighty-one of the said Act".
12, 13 & 14 Geo. 6. c. 67	Civil Aviation Act 1949	Section 36.
12, 13 & 14 Geo. 6. c. 67	Civil Aviation Act 1949	In section 51(2), the words "exceptions, adaptations and".
12, 13 & 14 Geo. 6. c. 67	Civil Aviation Act 1949	Section 55(3).
12, 13 & 14 Geo. 6. c. 67	Civil Aviation Act 1949	In section 57(1), the words from "may contain" to "Order and".
12, 13 & 14 Geo. 6. c. 67	Civil Aviation Act 1949	Section 59(2).
12, 13 & 14 Geo. 6. c. 67	Civil Aviation Act 1949	In section 63(1), the definition of "purposes of civil aviation".
12, 13 & 14 Geo. 6. c. 67	Civil Aviation Act 1949	Sections 66 and 67.
12, 13 & 14 Geo. 6. c. 67	Civil Aviation Act 1949	In Schedule 4, in sub-paragraph (6) of paragraph 2 the words from "(including" onwards and paragraph 10.
12, 13 & 14 Geo. 6. c. 67	Civil Aviation Act 1949	In Schedule 9, in Part I the words "in section twenty-three, subsections (8), (9), (10) and (11)" and Part II.
12, 13 & 14 Geo. 6. c. 67	Civil Aviation Act 1949	In paragraph 1(5) of Schedule 11, the word "exceptions" and the words "and adaptations".
8 & 9 Eliz. 2. c. 38	Civil Aviation (Licensing) Act 1960	In subsection (3) of section 5, the words from "and" onwards.
10 & 11 Eliz. 2. c. 8	Civil Aviation (Eurocontrol) Act 1962	In section 4, in subsection (1) the words from "and may" onwards and in subsection (1C), paragraph (c) and the word "and" immediately preceding it.
10 & 11 Eliz. 2. c. 8	Civil Aviation (Eurocontrol) Act 1962	Section 9.
1967 c. 52	Tokyo Convention Act 1967	In section 6(1)(a)(ii), the words "or this Act".
1967 c. 52	Tokyo Convention Act 1967	In section 8(1), the words "exceptions, adaptations and".
1968 c. 61	Civil Aviation Act 1968	In section 1(2), the words "exceptions, adaptations or".
1968 c. 61	Civil Aviation Act 1968	In subsection (4) of section 3, the word "which" in the third place where it occurs and the words from "may contain" onwards.
1968 c. 61	Civil Aviation Act 1968	In subsection (5) of section 6, the word "which" in the third place where it occurs and the words from "may contain" onwards.
1968 c. 61	Civil Aviation Act 1968	In subsection (10) of section 14, the words from "and any" onwards.
1968 c. 61	Civil Aviation Act 1968	In section 16, in subsection (2)(a) the words "adaptations or" and subsection (3).
1968 c. 61	Civil Aviation Act 1968	Section 17(3).
1968 c. 61	Civil Aviation Act 1968	In section 18, in subsection (2), the words from "contain" to "and may" and in subsection (3), the proviso.
1969 c. 48	Post Office Act 1969	Section 88(3).
1971 c. 75	Civil Aviation Act 1971	Section 14(9)(c).
1971 c. 75	Civil Aviation Act 1971	In section 15, subsection (3) and in subsection (4), the words "Schedule 4 to this Act and the said Schedule 5 as incorporated in this Act" and the words from "and in" onwards.
1971 c. 75	Civil Aviation Act 1971	Section 62(1).
1971 c. 75	Civil Aviation Act 1971	In section 63, in subsection (1) the words "(except orders appointing a day)", in subsection (3) the words from "but" onwards and in subsection (4), paragraph (b) and the word "and" immediately preceding it.
1971 c. 75	Civil Aviation Act 1971	Section 65(1)(a).
1971 c. 75	Civil Aviation Act 1971	Section 66(1)(a).
1972 c. 70	Local Government Act 1972	Section 131(2)(h).
1973 c. 27	Bahamas Independence Act 1973	In Schedule 2, paragraph 8.
1978 c. 8	Civil Aviation Act 1978	Section 5(3)(a).
1978 c. 8	Civil Aviation Act 1978	Section 13(2).
1978 c. 8	Civil Aviation Act 1978	In section 16, subsection (4), in subsection (5) paragraph (b) and the word "and" immediately preceding it and in subsection (6) the words "(4) and".
1978 c. 15	Solomon Islands Act 1978	In the Schedule, paragraph 6.
1978 c. 20	Tuvalu Act 1978	In Schedule 2, paragraph 6.
1979 c. 27	Kiribati Act 1979	In the Schedule, paragraph 7.
1981 c. 52	Belize Act 1981	In Schedule 2, paragraph 6.

== Subsequent developments ==
Section 4 and schedules 1 and 2 to the act were repealed by section 109(3) of, and schedule 16 to, the Civil Aviation Act 1982, which came into force on 27 August 1982.

The whole act was repealed by section 1(1) of, and part 4 of schedule 1 to, the Statute Law (Repeals) Act 2004, which came into force on 22 July 2004.
