= Asiad =

Asiad or ASIAD may refer to:

- Asiad, another name for the Asian Games
- ASIAD, an acronym for Aviation Security in Airport Development

== See also ==
- Asiad Main Stadium (disambiguation)
