= Airport policing in the United Kingdom =

Airport policing in the United Kingdom has taken many forms since the rise of scheduled airline services in the post-war period. Policing at major civilian airports was the responsibility of specialist constabularies operated by three central government departments until 1974, when the rise in international terrorism saw armed police from territorial police forces deployed to major airports under the provisions of the Policing of Airports Act 1974. As more minor airports grew in size, they too switched to armed police provided by local police forces. However, the funding agreements for the provision of such services varied wildly from airport to airport, leading to disagreements between airport operators and chief constables. A new regime, the Airport Security Planning Framework, came into force in January 2010, and brought airport operators, airlines and police forces together to develop joint security and policing plans for all passenger airports.

== History ==
=== Air Ministry Constabulary ===
Civilian airports in the United Kingdom were originally under the control of the Air Ministry, which was mainly concerned with the operation of the Royal Air Force, but was also responsible for non-military aviation. During this time, airfields and aerodromes were policed by the Air Ministry Constabulary, who were sworn in as special constables under section 3 of the Special Constables Act 1923. In 1946, F. J. May OBE was appointed as the first Chief Constable, and Squadron Leader D. F. Grierson MBE was appointed as Deputy Chief Constable.

=== Ministry of Civil Aviation Constabulary ===
After World War II, the rise in civil aviation saw the creation of the Ministry of Civil Aviation in 1946, and Heathrow Airport was brought under the ministry's control that year. The Ministry of Civil Aviation Constabulary was formed in 1948, and its first chief constable (appointed that year) was Sir John Bennett, a former Inspector-General of Police for the province of Punjab, India. Bennett died in June 1949, and was replaced by W. Ronnie who had been deputy chief constable under Bennett, prior to which he was the Chief Constable of Breconshire Constabulary, and a member of Buckinghamshire Constabulary from 1927 to 1947. Members of the Civil Aviation Constabulary were sworn in as special constables under section 37 of the Civil Aviation Act 1949.

=== British Airports Authority Constabulary ===
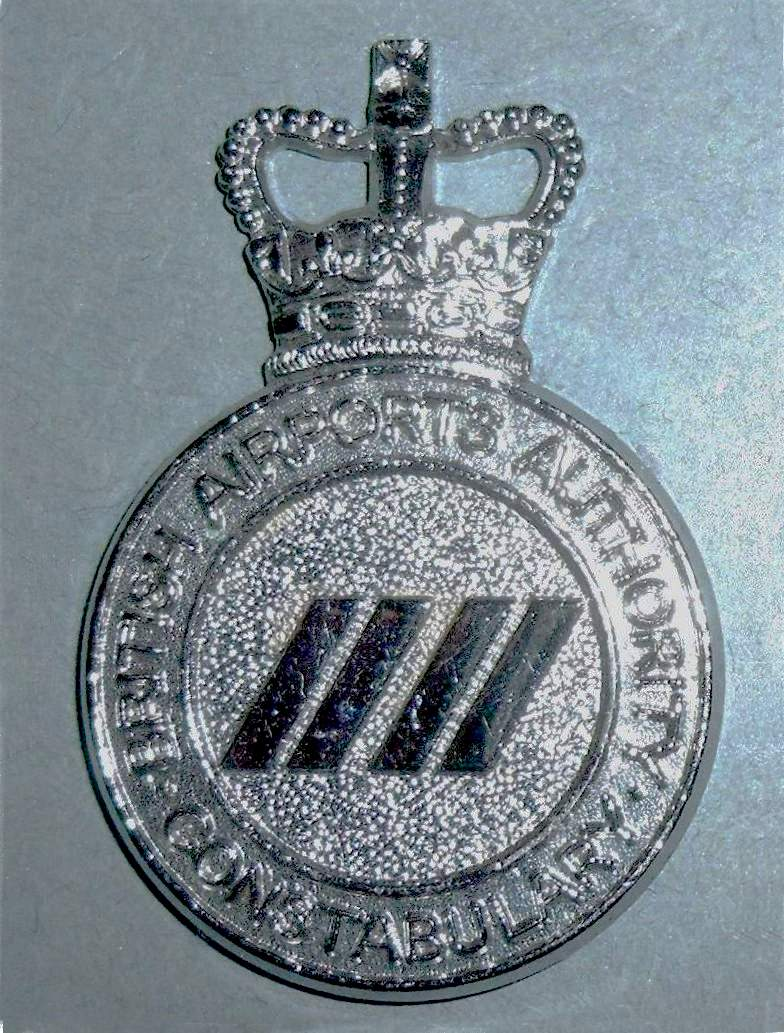
A cap badge of the British Airports Authority Constabulary.

The British Airports Authority was established in 1965 by the Airport Authority Act 1965, and on 1 April 1966 the new British Airports Authority Constabulary (BAAC) took on responsibility for operating London Heathrow, London Gatwick and London Stansted airport. The change of administration was seen as an opportunity to partially reform old working methods, and then-novel innovations were introduced, such as report forms with tick-boxes, an index card system and dictation machines for detectives. In December of that year, the strength of the force stood at 201. In 1969 the Chief Constable, Major W. Ronnie, was awarded the Queen's Police Medal. BAA took on Edinburgh Airport in 1971, and Aberdeen Airport and Glasgow Airport in 1975. By mid-1970, the strength of the BAAC stood at 326, of which 28 were women.

BAAC constables were sworn in under section 10 of the Airport Authority Act 1965. They were attested before a justice of the peace (or a sheriff in Scotland), and had "the powers and privileges and [were] liable to the duties and responsibilities of a constable" on all the aerodromes owned or managed by BAA. They also enjoyed their powers when following (pursuing) a person from such an aerodrome, if they could have arrested them on the aerodrome. BAA had the power to sack or suspend constables, and were vicariously liable for their actions. In April 1971, R. M. Carson was appointed as Chief Constable of the BAAC.

=== Municipal airport police forces ===
However, not all major airports were under the control of BAA. In 1961, control over Liverpool Airport had passed from the Ministry of Civil Aviation to Liverpool City Council, who established Liverpool Airport Police in that year. Separate police forces were also maintained for Manchester Airport (Manchester Airport Police) from 1954 to 1976, Birmingham Airport (Birmingham Airport Police) from 1970 to 1976 and Glasgow Airport from 1969 to 1975. Belfast International Airport have operated a separate police force, Belfast International Airport Constabulary, since 1971, which still exists today.

Members of all the police forces had full police powers whilst on the airport (in the case of Birmingham Airport Police, their powers extended when in pursuit of a person from the airport as with BAAC).

Liverpool Airport Police were effectively disbanded in 1974, when political change at the city council saw Liverpool Parks Police merged with the airport police into a civilian "Liverpool City Security Force".

Police forces were also maintained by Teesside Airport, Aberdeen Airport (pre-BAAC), East Midlands Airport, Luton Airport and Southend Airport.

== Designation under the Policing of Airports Act 1974 ==
In 1974, a terrorist alert at Heathrow Airport caused the army to be deployed in an immediate response. Although the exact circumstances of their deployment are still unclear, the effect was that the armed officers from the Metropolitan Police were, for the first time, permanently deployed to Heathrow Airport. The BAA, being a public corporation (but not under the direct control of the government), could not arm its officers, and nor could the municipally-controlled police forces at Birmingham or Manchester.

Policing of Airports Act 1974 (Note: Section 10(1).)
- Act of Parliament
- Parliament of the United Kingdom
- Long title: An Act to make provision for enabling the policing of any airport designated for that purpose to be undertaken by the police force for the area in which it is wholly or mainly situated; and for connected purposes.
- Citation: 1974 c. 41
- Territorial extent: United Kingdom

Dates
- Royal assent: 31 July 1974
- Commencement: 31 July 1974 (Note: The Acts of Parliament (Commencement) Act 1793.)
- Repealed: 23 October 1982
Other legislation
Repealed by	Aviation Security Act 1982

Status: Repealed

Text of statute as originally enacted

As a response, the government introduced the Policing of Airports Act 1974 (c. 41), which gave them the power to "designate" airports for the purposes of policing. Designation of a particular airport caused policing at that airport to become the responsibility of the local territorial police force for the airport (who could deploy armed officers), and the airport operator reimbursed the police force accordingly.

The designated airports were those owned by BAA at the time (Heathrow, (Note: Policing of Airports (Heathrow) Order 1974 (SI 1974/1671)) Stansted, (Note: Policing of Airports (Stansted) Order 1975 (SI 1975/168)) Gatwick, (Note: Policing of Airports (Gatwick) Order 1975 (SI 1975/375)) Aberdeen, (Note: Policing of Airports (Aberdeen) Order 1975 (SI 1975/1769)) Edinburgh, (Note: Policing of Airports (Edinburgh) Order 1975 (SI 1975/447)) Glasgow (Note: Policing of Airports (Glasgow) Order 1975 (SI 1975/443)) and Glasgow Prestwick (Note: Policing of Airports (Prestwick) Order 1975 (SI 1975/445))), plus Birmingham (Note: Policing of Airports (Birmingham) Order 1976 (SI 1976/590)) and Manchester (Note: Policing of Airports (Manchester) Order 1976 (SI 1976/1045)) airports, then under the control of their respective local authorities. Consequently, the BAAC (Note: Policing of Airports (Gatwick) (First Supplementary) Order 1975 (SI 1975/376), Policing of Airports (Heathrow) (First Supplementary) Order 1974 (SI 1974/1672), Policing of Airports (Stansted) (First Supplementary) Order 1975 (SI 1975/169), Policing of Airports (Prestwick) (First Supplementary) Order 1975 (SI 1975/446), Policing of Airports (Edinburgh) (First Supplementary) Order 1975 (SI 1975/448)) and the Glasgow, (Note: Policing of Airports (Glasgow) (First Supplementary) Order 1975 (SI 1975/444)) Birmingham (Note: Policing of Airports (Birmingham) (First Supplementary) Order 1976 (SI 1976/591)) and Manchester (Note: Policing of Airports (Manchester) (First Supplementary) Order 1976 (SI 1976/1046)) airport police forces were disbanded on 1 November 1974 and its members absorbed within the ranks of the respective territorial police forces.

However, section 57 of the Civil Aviation Act 1982 allows the creation of a body of "special constables on any premises for the time being vested in or under the control of the Secretary of State. Every person so appointed shall be sworn in by the justices duly to execute the office of a constable on those premises and when so sworn in shall, on those premises, have the powers and privileges and be liable to the duties and responsibilities of a constable."

57 Power to appoint special constables.

(1) Any two justices of the peace may appoint such persons as may be nominated for the purpose by the Secretary of State to be special constables on any premises for the time being vested in or under the control of the Secretary of State.

(2) Every person so appointed shall be sworn in by the justices duly to execute the office of a constable on those premises and when so sworn in shall, on those premises, have the powers and privileges and be liable to the duties and responsibilities of a constable.

(3) Special constables appointed under this section shall be under the exclusive control of the Secretary of State, and the Secretary of State shall have power to suspend or terminate the appointment of any such special constable.

(4) In the application of this section to Scotland references to two justices of the peace shall be construed as references to a single justice of the peace, and references to swearing in shall be construed as references to making a declaration in the terms prescribed under section 10 of the Police and Fire Reform (Scotland) Act 2012.

Although the designation system allowed territorial police forces to recover the additional costs of providing extra police officers for airports in their police area, it had some limitations. There was no effective means of arbitration between an airport operator and the police force – the Secretary of State for Transport could "determine" what the payment would be, but could not adjudicate on what level of service should be provided. At Luton Airport, which was not designated, Bedfordshire Police provided armed police under their statutory duty to provide "effective and efficient policing", but the airport operator refused to pay for the service.

== 2006 Independent Review of Policing at Airports ==
In 2006, Stephen Boys Smith was tasked by the Department for Transport and the Home Office to carry out a review of airport policing. His report recommended that partnership working be enhanced and that the system of "designations" be discontinued. The Policing and Crime Act 2009 introduced a new statutory framework, the Airport Security Planning Framework, which applies to airports designated by direction of the Department of Transport Security and Contingencies Directorate (see below). Under this framework, two groups are established at each airport: a Risk Advisory Group and a Security Executive Group. The Risk Advisory Group assess the security risks to the airport and issues Risk Reports. The Risk Reports feed into the Security Executive Group, who draw up an Aerodrome Security Plan (ASP). The ASP covers the measures in place at the airport, who is responsible for the measures and how those measures will be monitored.

If the ASP includes the provision of police services, then a Police Services Agreement (PSA) is also made. A PSA includes the level of policing that will be provided, how it will be paid for, and what facilities will be provided by the airport operator to the police force. PSAs do not cover responses to emergencies (both day-to-day emergencies and those covered by the Civil Contingencies Act 2004), extra police provision for hijack designated airports, border control work or protection against man-portable air-defense systems. The new Framework also includes expanded powers of dispute resolution for the Secretary of State for Transport, and provides for recourse to judicial review by the High Court.

=== Airports covered by the National Aviation Security Plan ===
The following airports are covered by the Single Consolidated Direction 2010, and are subject to the Airport Security Planning Framework as outlined above.

- Aberdeen Airport
- Barra Airport
- George Best Belfast City Airport
- Belfast International Airport
- Benbecula Airport
- Birmingham Airport
- Blackpool Airport
- Bournemouth Airport
- Bristol Airport
- Cambridge Airport
- Campbeltown Airport
- Cardiff Airport
- Carlisle Lake District Airport
- City of Derry Airport
- Coventry Airport
- Doncaster Sheffield Airport
- Dundee Airport
- East Midlands Airport
- Edinburgh Airport
- Exeter Airport
- Farnborough Airport
- Gatwick Airport
- Glasgow Airport
- Glasgow Prestwick Airport
- Gloucestershire Airport
- Hawarden Airport
- Heathrow Airport
- Humberside Airport
- Inverness Airport
- Kirkwall Airport
- Leeds Bradford Airport
- Liverpool John Lennon Airport
- London Ashford Airport
- London Biggin Hill Airport
- London City Airport
- London Southend Airport
- Luton Airport
- Manchester Airport
- Manston Airport
- Newcastle International Airport
- Newquay Airport
- Norwich Airport
- Oxford Airport
- Scatsta Airport
- Shoreham Airport
- Southampton Airport
- Stansted Airport
- Stornoway Airport
- Sumburgh Airport
- Teesside International Airport
- Tiree Airport
- Wick Airport
- Wolverhampton Airport

== See also ==
- Airport police
- Airport security
- Transit police
- Aviation Security in Airport Development
