= Hard target =

Hard target can refer to:

- hard(ened) target, a defended target (in relation to a security threat); the opposite of a soft target
- Hard Target, a 1993 American action film
- "Hard Target" (Generator Rex), a 2011 television episode
- "Hard Target" (Suspects), a 2014 television episode
