= Birmingham police =

Birmingham police may refer to:

In Birmingham, England:

- Birmingham City Police
- Birmingham Airport Police
- Birmingham Market Police
- Birmingham Parks Police

In Birmingham, Alabama:

- Birmingham Police Department (Alabama)
