= Target hardening =

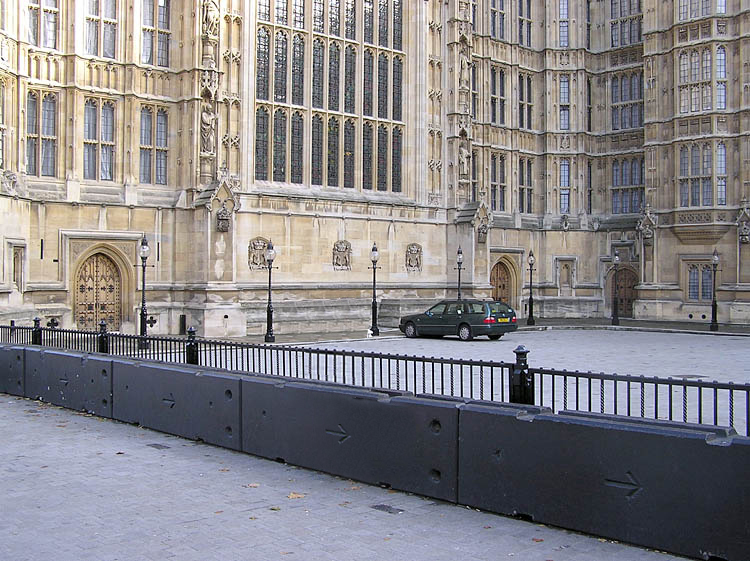
Security measures taken to protect the Houses of Parliament in London, UK. This hostile vehicle mitigation is a common form of target hardening and is designed to prevent a vehicle being rammed into the building or into people on the pavement next to the building. It also enforces a zone of protective stand-off from any explosive detonation location

Target hardening, also referred to simply as hardening when made clear by the context, is a term used by police officers, those working in security, and the military referring to the strengthening of the security of a building or installation in order to protect it in the event of attack or reduce the risk of theft. It is believed that a "strong, visible defense will deter or delay an attack".

In terms of business and home security, target hardening is one of the suite of protective measures that are included in crime prevention through environmental design. This can include ensuring all doors and windows are sourced and fitted in such a way that they can resist forcible and surreptitious intruder attack, adding hard barriers and landscapes that resist vehicle and pedestrian intrusion, adding fences, walls and hostile planting. All of these are greatly assisted by removing or pruning any trees or bushes that could offer suitable hiding places or could be used to climb to a higher level of the property. However, for a business, taking target hardening too far can send the wrong message out to potential customers.

In military or counter-terrorism terms, target hardening refers to ensuring strategic or tactical assets are secured against adversary attack.

Other more specific terms associated with target hardening include hostile vehicle mitigation and "blast hardening".

== See also ==
- Armour#Other types
- Counter-terrorism
- Radiation hardening
- Aviation Security in Airport Development - A UK Department of Transport airport anti-terror target-hardening program.
- Soft target
