= Manchester Airport Police =

Former law enforcement agency

Manchester Airport Police is a defunct police force of the United Kingdom, formerly responsible for policing Manchester Airport, in Manchester, England.

== Basis ==
The Airport Police were sworn in as special constables under section 18 of the Manchester Corporation Act 1954 (2 & 3 Eliz. 2. c. xlviii). This gave them all the powers and privileges of a constable in the airport. The corporation had the power to suspend/terminate the appointment of constables.

In 1975, the force had 68 members. Following the designation of Manchester Airport under the Policing of Airports Act 1974 (c. 41), responsibility for policing the airport passed from the Airport Police to the local territorial police force, Greater Manchester Police, on 1 August 1976, and the airport police officers were transferred to Greater Manchester Police on that date.

== See also ==
- Airport policing in the United Kingdom
- Law enforcement in the United Kingdom
- List of law enforcement agencies in the United Kingdom
