= Hostile vehicle mitigation =

Protection against vehicle ramming

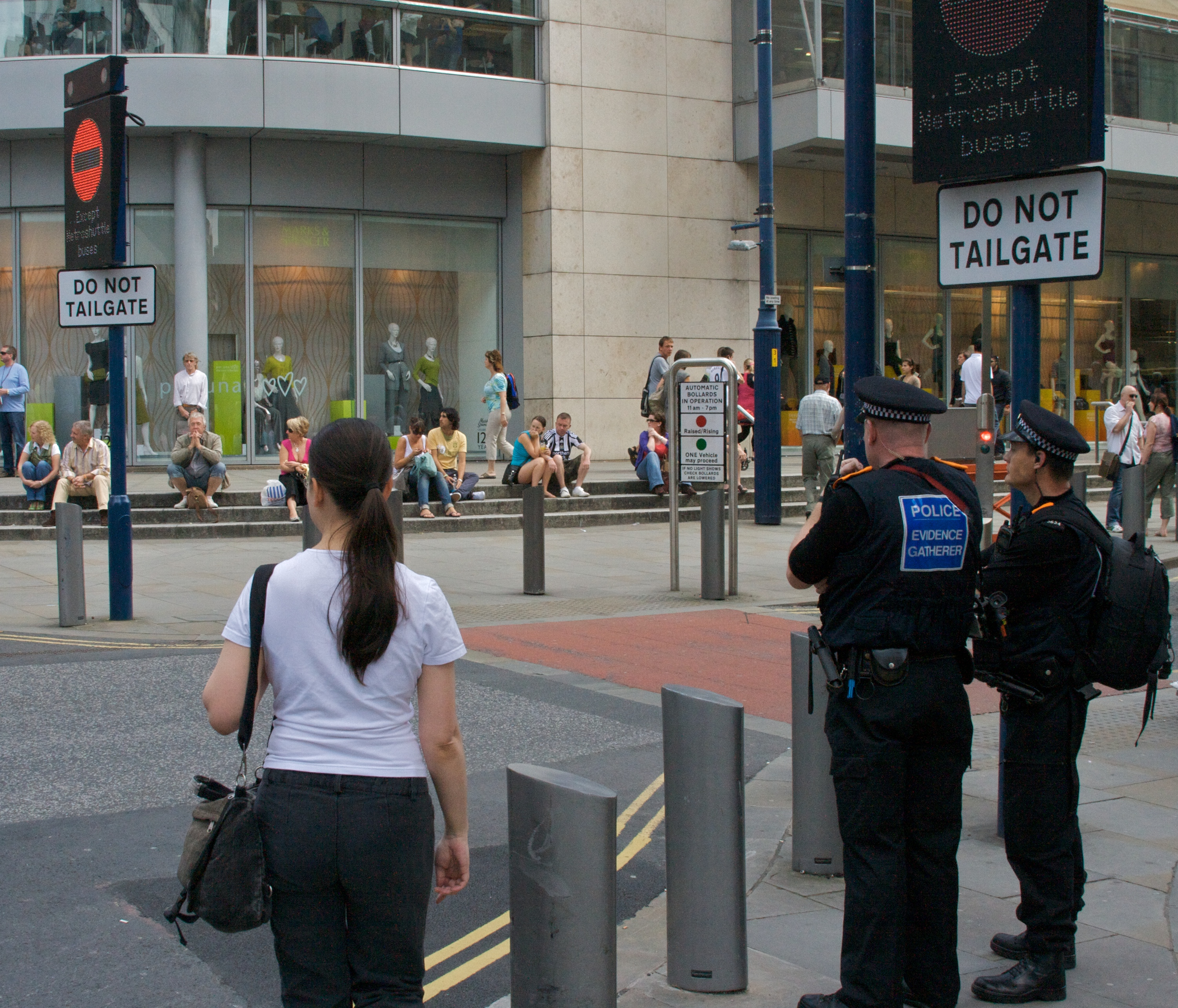
HVM bollards enforcing a vehicle control zone in Manchester's pedestrianised city centre

Hostile vehicle mitigation (HVM) is a generic term that covers a suite of anti-terrorist protective measures that are often employed around buildings or publicly accessible spaces/venues of particular significance. The design of these various vehicle security barriers and landscape treatments came about as security authorities across the globe sought to mitigate the effects of vehicle-borne improvised explosive devices (VBIED) and vehicle-ramming attacks. The sorts of places that warrant consideration as potential terrorist targets in need of HVM include government buildings, airports, large railway stations, sports venues, concentrations of entertainment and crowded nighttime economy, among others.

== Usage ==
Common types of HVM include locally manufactured barrier systems such as the Jersey barrier and Bremer wall, as well as proprietary crash-tested and engineered vehicle bollard systems designed to resist the effects of a vehicle-ramming attack. HVM can also include adapted hard landscape features, resistive street furniture, sculpture, planters and significant level changes; with a little imagination HVM may be disguised inside architectural features in a street scene.

When installed and fixed correctly, HVM is designed to resist hostile vehicle of a certain category (15,000lb medium duty truck, etc.) for a certain penetration distance (P1 (up to 1m), P2 (1 to 7m), or P3 (greater than 7m), at various speeds (M30 (30mph), M40 (40mph), and M50 (50mph). These vehicle security barriers undergo various destructive tests carried out by accredited test establishments. The three standards that are generally quoted when specifying HVM performance are:

- ISO IWA 14-1 - an international working agreement
- BSI PAS 68 - the UK standard
- ASTM F2656-07 (based on DoS SD-STD-02.01).

These standards set roughly similar criteria for destructive impact testing, although there are differences between the three and vehicle geometries in particular are at the root of some of these differences. HVM barrier selection will be conditioned by a hostile vehicle dynamics study carried out by a suitably qualified security specialist.

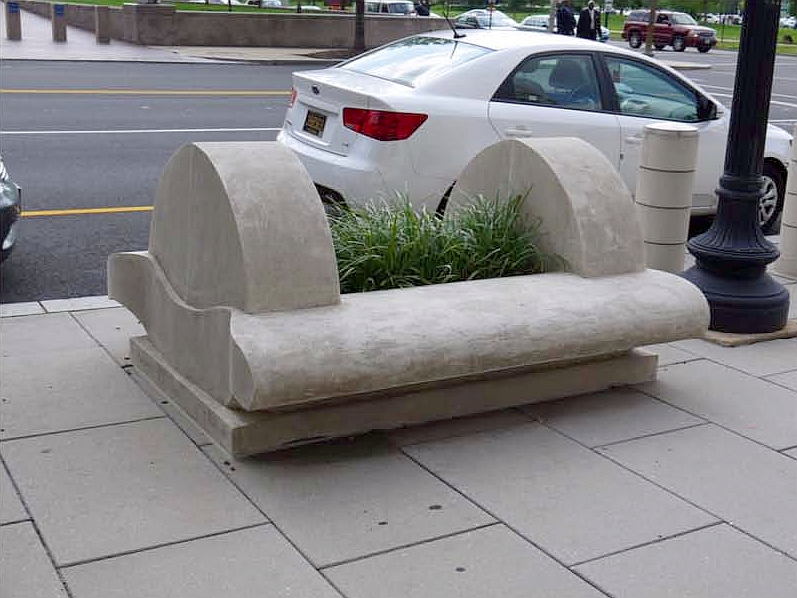
Concrete planters provide protection similar to that of bollards in Washington, D.C.

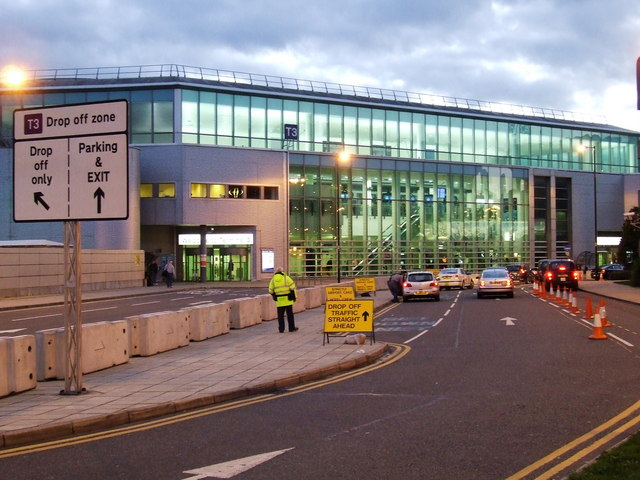
Concrete blocks placed to protect Terminal 3 at Manchester Airport from hostile vehicle attack; these have now been replaced by more attractive bollards

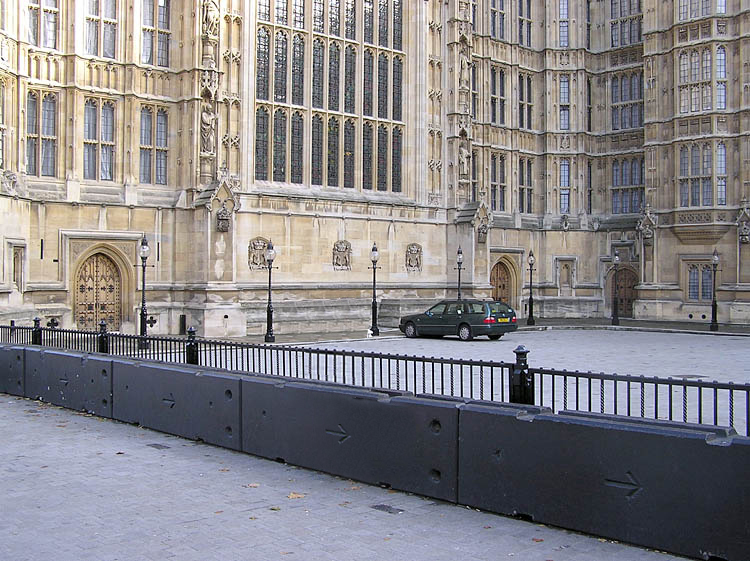
Security measures taken to protect the Houses of Parliament in London, UK. This hostile vehicle mitigation is a common form of target hardening and is designed to prevent a vehicle being rammed into the building or into people on the pavement next to the building. It also enforces a zone of protective stand-off from any explosive detonation location.

Ideally a protective layer of HVM should surround the building or place being protected. This HVM protection line should be stood off from the building facade or places expected to be crowded. This protective standoff distance is critical in the case of VBIEDs as 'every metre counts' and often distance is one of the best ways to achieve explosive blast effects mitigation.

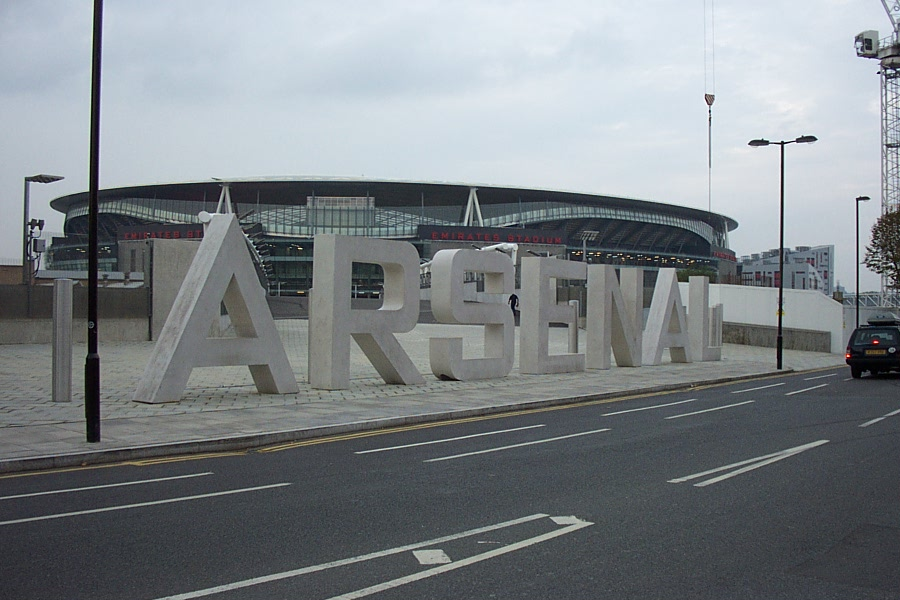
The ARSENAL lettering in the foreground of the Emirates Stadium is an example of disguised HVM.

More recently the focus of HVM has expanded to reduce the potential for vehicle ram attacks directed at crowded events and places. Recent non-VBIED (i.e. vehicle as a weapon) attacks against pedestrians include:

- The 2016 Nice truck attack
- The 2016 Ohio State University attack
- The 2016 Berlin truck attack
- The 2017 Jerusalem attack
- The January 2017 Melbourne car attack
- The 2017 Sandy, Utah attack
- The 2017 Stockholm truck attack
- The 2017 Westminster attack
- The 2017 London Bridge attack
- The 2017 Finsbury Park attack
- The 2025 New Orleans truck attack
- The 2025 Vancouver car attack

HVM can also be used to protect against ram raids which are invariably criminal attacks against high net-worth targets such as jewelers, cash and valuables in transit depots, bullion storage facilities, art galleries, museums, and high-end fashion stores.

Correctly installed HVM barrier systems should not adversely affect pedestrian permeability.

== See also ==
- Deaths by car bomb
- Improvised explosive device (IED)
- List of mass car bombings
- Security
- Physical security
