= International Organisations Act 1968 =

Act of the Parliament of the United Kingdom

International Organisations Act 1968 (Note: Section 13.)
- Act of Parliament
- Parliament of the United Kingdom
- Long title: An Act to make new provision (in substitution for the International Organisations (Immunities and Privileges) Act 1950 and the European Coal and Steel Community Act 1955) as to privileges, immunities and facilities to be accorded in respect of certain international organisations and in respect of persons connected with such organisations and other persons; and for purposes connected with the matters aforesaid.
- Citation: 1968 c. 48
- Territorial extent: United Kingdom

Dates
- Royal assent: 26 July 1968
- Commencement: 26 July 1968 (Note: The Acts of Parliament (Commencement) Act 1793.)

Other legislation
- Amends: Civil Aviation (Eurocontrol) Act 1962; Consular Relations Act 1968; See § Repealed enactments
- Repeals/revokes: See § Repealed enactments
- Amended by: Diplomatic and other Privileges Act 1971; Finance Act 1972; European Communities Act 1972; Social Security Act 1973; Social Security (Consequential Provisions) Act 1975; Customs and Excise Management Act 1979; International Organisations Act 1981; Civil Aviation Act 1982; Local Government Finance Act 1988; Local Government and Housing Act 1989; Taxation of Chargeable Gains Act 1992; Local Government Finance Act 1992; Finance (No. 2) Act 1992 (Commencement No. 2 and Transitional Provisions) Order 1992; Statute Law (Repeals) Act 1993; Vehicle Excise and Registration Act 1994; Value Added Tax Act 1994; Northern Ireland (Location of Victims' Remains) Act 1999; International Organisations Act 2005; Civil Partnership Act 2004 (International Immunities and Privileges, Companies and Adoption) Order 2005; Taxation (Cross-border Trade) Act 2018; European Union (Future Relationship) Act 2020; Retained EU Law (Revocation and Reform) Act 2023 (Consequential Amendment) Regulations 2023
- Relates to: International Organisations Act 2005

Status: Amended

Text of statute as originally enacted

Revised text of statute as amended

Text of the International Organisations Act 1968 as in force today (including any amendments) within the United Kingdom, from legislation.gov.uk.

The International Organisations Act 1968 (c. 48) is an act of the Parliament of the United Kingdom which recognises the UK's duties to international organisations in which it is a member.

== Provisions ==
=== Repealed enactments ===
Section 12(4) of the act repealed 3 enactments, listed in schedule 2 to the act.

Enactments repealed by section 12(4)
Citation	Short title	Extent of repeal
14 Geo. 6. c. 14	International Organisations (Immunities and Privileges) Act 1950	The whole act.
4 & 5 Eliz. 2. c. 2	German Conventions Act 1955	Section 1(2).
4 & 5 Eliz. 2. c. 4	European Coal and Steel Community Act 1955	The whole act.

== See also ==
- UK constitutional law
- International law
