= Space Industry Act 2018 =

Act of the Parliament of the United Kingdom

Space Industry Act 2018 (Note: Section 72.)
- Act of Parliament
- Parliament of the United Kingdom
- Long title: An Act to make provision about space activities and suborbital activities; and for connected purposes.
- Citation: 2018 c. 5
- Introduced by: Chris Grayling MP, Secretary of State for Transport (Commons); Lord Callanan (Lords)
- Territorial extent: England and Wales; Scotland; Northern Ireland; (Note: Section 71.)

Dates
- Royal assent: 15 March 2018
- Commencement: Various (Note: Section 70.)
Other legislation
Amends	Land Registration Act (Northern Ireland) 1970; Magistrates' Courts Act 1980; Civil Aviation Act 1982; Aviation Security Act 1982; Criminal Justice Act 1982; Police and Criminal Evidence Act 1984; Airports Act 1986; Outer Space Act 1986; Police and Criminal Evidence (Northern Ireland) Order 1989; Aviation and Maritime Security Act 1990; Airports (Northern Ireland) Order 1994; Town and Country Planning (Scotland) Act 1997; Transport Act 2000; Railways and Transport Safety Act 2003; Sexual Offences 2003; Criminal Justice Act 2003; Criminal Justice (Northern Ireland) Order 2004; Terrorism Act 2006; Armed Forces Act 2006; Counter-Terrorism Act 2008; Criminal Justice (Northern Ireland) Order 2008; Energy Act 2013; Modern Slavery Act 2015
Amended by	Sentencing (Pre-consolidation Amendments) Act 2020; Sentencing Act 2020; Counter-Terrorism and Sentencing Act 2021; Criminal Justice Act 2003 (Commencement No. 33) and Sentencing Act 2020 (Commencement No. 2) Regulations 2022; Judicial Review and Courts Act 2022 (Magistrates’ Court Sentencing Powers) Regulations 2023; Space Industry (Indemnities) Act 2025

Status: Amended

History of passage through Parliament

Text of statute as originally enacted

Revised text of statute as amended

The Space Industry Act 2018 (c. 5) is an act of the Parliament of the United Kingdom.

== Provisions ==
The act extended the regulatory framework for commercial spaceflight activities (involving both launch to orbit and sub-orbital spaceflight) to be carried out from spaceports in the United Kingdom and launches and other activities overseas by UK entities. It operates in conjunction with the Outer Space Act 1986.

The act prohibits the carrying on of spaceflight and specified associated activities without a licence and breach of this prohibition will be an offence. The Secretary of State is the regulatory authority and has a duty to secure public safety in carrying out his or her functions under the Act. There are powers to enable the Civil Aviation Authority or other persons to carry out functions on behalf of the Secretary of State. Applicants for licences will also be required to meet any requirements set out in secondary legislation made under this Act.

It creates offences including:

- Hijacking of spacecraft
- Destroying, damaging or endangering safety of spacecraft
- Endangering safety at spaceports
- Possession of a firearm or explosive at a spaceport or on a spacecraft

Prosecutions under this act require the consent of the Attorney General for England and Wales or the Director of Public Prosecutions in Northern Ireland.

== Amendment ==
Space Industry (Indemnities) Act 2025 (Note: Section 2(4).)
- Act of Parliament
- Parliament of the United Kingdom
- Long title: An Act to require operator licences authorising the carrying out of spaceflight activities to specify the licensee’s indemnity limit.
- Citation: 2025 c. 35
- Introduced by: John Grady MP (Commons); Baroness Anelay of St Johns (Lords)
- Territorial extent: England and Wales; Scotland; Northern Ireland; (Note: Section 2(1).)

Dates
- Royal assent: 18 December 2025
- Commencement: 18 February 2025 (Note: Section 2(3).)
Other legislation
Amends	Space Industry Act 2018

Status: Current legislation

History of passage through Parliament

Text of statute as originally enacted

Revised text of statute as amended

In 2025, the 2018 act was amended by the Space Industry (Indemnities) Act 2025 (c. 35) to allow the Civil Aviation Authority to put caps on liability for damage or loss caused by spaceflight activities into licences.
