= Aerial Navigation Act 1913 =

Act of the Parliament of the United Kingdom

Aerial Navigation Act 1913 (Note: Section 3.)
- Act of Parliament
- Parliament of the United Kingdom
- Long title: An Act to amend the Aerial Navigation Act, 1911.
- Citation: 2 & 3 Geo. 5. c. 22
- Territorial extent: United Kingdom

Dates
- Royal assent: 14 February 1913
- Commencement: 14 February 1913 (Note: The Acts of Parliament (Commencement) Act 1793.)
- Repealed: 23 December 1920
Other legislation
Amends	Aerial Navigation Act 1911
Repealed by	Aerial Navigation Act 1920

Status: Repealed

Text of statute as originally enacted

The Aerial Navigation Act 1913 (2 & 3 Geo. 5. c. 22) was an act of the Parliament of the United Kingdom that amended the Aerial Navigation Act 1911 (1 & 2 Geo. 5. c. 4), designed to protect Britain from attack from air. It was passed within a week and gave the British government the authority to shoot down aircraft flying over prohibited territory.

== Subsequent developments ==
The whole act was repealed by section 20(2) of the Air Navigation Act 1920 (10 & 11 Geo. 5. c. 80), which came into force on 23 December 1920.
