= Outer Space Act 1986 =

Act of the Parliament of the United Kingdom

Outer Space Act 1986 (Note: Section 15(1).)
- Act of Parliament
- Parliament of the United Kingdom
- Long title: An Act to confer licensing and other powers on the Secretary of State to secure compliance with the international obligations of the United Kingdom with respect to the launching and operation of space objects and the carrying on of other activities in outer space by persons connected with this country.
- Citation: 1986 c. 38
- Territorial extent: England and Wales; Scotland; Northern Ireland; (Note: Section 15(5).)

Dates
- Royal assent: 18 July 1986
- Commencement: 31 July 1989 (Note: Section 15(2)–(4). The Outer Space Act 1986 (Commencement) Order 1989.)

Other legislation
- Amended by: Statute Law (Repeals) Act 2004; Deregulation Act 2015; Space Industry Act 2018
- Relates to: Airports Act 1986

Status: Amended

Text of statute as originally enacted

Revised text of statute as amended

Text of the Outer Space Act 1986 as in force today (including any amendments) within the United Kingdom, from legislation.gov.uk.

The Outer Space Act 1986 (c. 38) is an act of the Parliament of the United Kingdom that implements the United Kingdom's international obligations with respect to space launches and operations by people connected to the country. The act did not come into force until 1 August 1989.

== Outline of provisions ==
The act specifies that anyone who launches a space object or carries out any activity in outer space must obtain a licence before doing so. This licence must be granted by the Secretary of state and may contain terms enforceable by prosecution.

Under section 7 a UK Registry of Outer Space Objects is maintained by the UK Space Agency, and is periodically published.

== Amendment of the Outer Space Act 1986 ==
Section 12 of the Deregulation Act 2015 amended the Outer Space Act 1986 to ensure licences specify the licensee's liability to indemnify the government regarding space activities authorised by the licence.

The Space Industry Act 2018 extended and improved the regulatory framework for commercial spaceflight activities to be carried out from spaceports in the United Kingdom and launches and other activities overseas by UK entities.

== See also ==
- British space programme
