= Aerial Navigation Act 1911 =

Act of the Parliament of the United Kingdom

Aerial Navigation Act 1911 (Note: Section 3.)
- Act of Parliament
- Parliament of the United Kingdom
- Long title: An Act to provide for the protection of the public against dangers arising from the Navigation of Aircraft.
- Citation: 1 & 2 Geo. 5. c. 4
- Territorial extent: United Kingdom

Dates
- Royal assent: 2 June 1911
- Commencement: 2 June 1911 (Note: The Acts of Parliament (Commencement) Act 1793.)
- Repealed: 23 December 1920
Other legislation
Amended by	Aerial Navigation Act 1913
Repealed by	Air Navigation Act 1920

Status: Repealed

Text of statute as originally enacted

The Aerial Navigation Act 1911 (1 & 2 Geo. 5. c. 4) was an act of the Parliament of the United Kingdom that conferred power to Parliament to close airspace over Britain including the English Channel, from foreign aircraft, when felt necessary. It was motivated by the perceived need to protect British citizens from aircraft incidents, following Louis Blériot's flight across the English Channel in 1909 and the Paris Convention of 1910.

== Subsequent developments ==
The whole act was repealed by section 20(2) of the Air Navigation Act 1920 (10 & 11 Geo. 5. c. 80), which came into force on 23 December 1920.

== See also ==
- International Air Navigation Conference
