= International Organisations (Immunities and Privileges) Act 1950 =

Act of the Parliament of the United Kingdom

International Organisations (Immunities and Privileges) Act 1950 (Note: Section 8.)
- Act of Parliament
- Parliament of the United Kingdom
- Long title: An Act to consolidate the Diplomatic Privileges (Extension) Acts, 1944 to 1950.
- Citation: 14 Geo. 6. c. 14
- Territorial extent: United Kingdom

Dates
- Royal assent: 12 July 1950
- Commencement: 12 July 1950 (Note: The Acts of Parliament (Commencement) Act 1793.)
- Repealed: 26 July 1968
Other legislation
Amends	See § Repealed enactments
Repeals/revokes	See § Repealed enactments
Amended by	Statute Law Revision Act 1953
Repealed by	International Organisations Act 1968

Status: Repealed

Text of statute as originally enacted

The International Organisations (Immunities and Privileges) Act 1950 (14 Geo. 6. c. 14) was an act of the Parliament of the United Kingdom that consolidated enactments relating to the immunities and privileges of international organisations in the United Kingdom.

== Provisions ==
=== Repealed enactments ===
Section 7(1) of the act repealed 3 enactments, listed in that section.

Citation	Short title	Extent of repeal
7 & 8 Geo. 6. c. 44	Diplomatic Privileges (Extension) Act 1944	The whole act.
9 & 10 Geo. 6. c. 66	Diplomatic Privileges (Extension) Act 1946	The whole act.
14 Geo. 6. c. 7	Diplomatic Privileges (Extension) Act 1950	The whole act.

== Subsequent developments ==
The whole act was repealed by section 12(4) of, and schedule 2 to, the International Organisations Act 1968, which came into force on 26 July 1968.
