= Aviation Security Act 1982 =

Act of the Parliament of the United Kingdom

Aviation Security Act 1982 (Note: Section 41(1).)
- Act of Parliament
- Parliament of the United Kingdom
- Long title: An Act to consolidate certain enactments relating to aviation security.
- Citation: 1982 c. 36
- Territorial extent: United Kingdom

Dates
- Royal assent: 23 July 1982
- Commencement: 23 October 1982 (Note: Section 41(2).)

Other legislation
- Amends: See § Repealed enactments
- Repeals/revokes: See § Repealed enactments
- Amended by: Airports Act 1986; Hong Kong (British Nationality) Order 1986; Extradition Act 1989; Aviation and Maritime Security Act 1990; Contracts (Applicable Law) Act 1990; Northern Ireland (Emergency Provisions) Act 1991; Statute Law (Repeals) Act 1993; Aviation Security (Air Cargo Agents) Regulations 1993; Merchant Shipping and Maritime Security Act 1997; Greater London Authority Act 1999; Police (Northern Ireland) Act 2000; Anti-terrorism, Crime and Security Act 2001; Title Conditions (Scotland) Act 2003; Statute Law (Repeals) Act 2004; Serious Organised Crime and Police Act 2005; Civil Aviation Act 2006; Police and Justice Act 2006; Transport Security (Electronic Communications) Order 2006; Police and Criminal Evidence (Amendment) (Northern Ireland) Order 2007; Policing and Crime Act 2009; Transfer of Tribunal Functions (Lands Tribunal and Miscellaneous Amendments) Order 2009; Aviation Security Regulations 2010; Police Reform and Social Responsibility Act 2011; Civil Aviation Act 2012; Crime and Courts Act 2013; Police and Fire Reform (Scotland) Act 2012 (Consequential Provisions and Modifications) Order 2013; Counter-Terrorism and Security Act 2015; Policing and Crime Act 2017; Space Industry Act 2018; Aviation Security (Amendment etc.) (EU Exit) Regulations 2019
- Relates to: Civil Aviation Act 1982

Status: Amended

Text of statute as originally enacted

Revised text of statute as amended

Text of the Aviation Security Act 1982 as in force today (including any amendments) within the United Kingdom, from legislation.gov.uk.

The Aviation Security Act 1982 (c. 36) is an act of the Parliament of the United Kingdom which covers offences against the safety of aircraft; protection of aircraft, aerodromes, and air navigation installations against acts of violence; policing of airports; and funding

The act implements security protocols and procedures to all United Kingdom Airports in an effort to increase security in airports.

In addition to murder and conspiracy, the defendants of the Pan Am Flight 103 at the Pan Am Flight 103 bombing trial, were accused of breaches of the 1982 act.

== Provisions ==
=== Repealed enactments ===
Section 40(2) of the act repealed 10 enactments, listed in schedule 3 to the act.

Enactments repealed by section 40(2)
Citation	Short title	Extent of repeal
1967 c. 52	Tokyo Convention Act 1967	In section 4, the words from " and any such court " onwards. In section 7(1), the words from " except where " to " the said section 92 ".
1971 c. 70	Hijacking Act 1971	The whole act.
1973 c. 47	Protection of Aircraft Act 1973	The whole act.
1974 c. 41	Policing of Airports Act 1974	The whole act.
1975 c. 78	Airports Authority Act 1975	In Part II of Schedule 5, paragraph 7.
1978 c. 8	Civil Aviation Act 1978	Sections 1 to 4. In section 13, in subsection (1) the words from " other " to " regulations ", in subsection (2) the words " or to make regulations", and in subsection (3) the words " (including an Order in Council) ". Section 16(3) and (4).
1980 c. 43	Magistrates' Courts Act 1980	In Schedule 7, paragraph 156.
1980 c. 60	Civil Aviation Act 1980	Sections 22 and 23.
1981 c. 61	British Nationality Act 1981	In Schedule 7, the entries relating to the Hijacking Act 1971 and the Protection of Aircraft Act 1973.
1982 c. 16	Civil Aviation Act 1982	In Schedule 14, paragraph 10. In Schedule 15, in paragraph 6 the words from " for the definitions" to " the said section 92 '; and " and paragraphs 10, 13, 15 and 20(3).
