= International Air Navigation Conference =

Conférence internationale de navigation aérienne
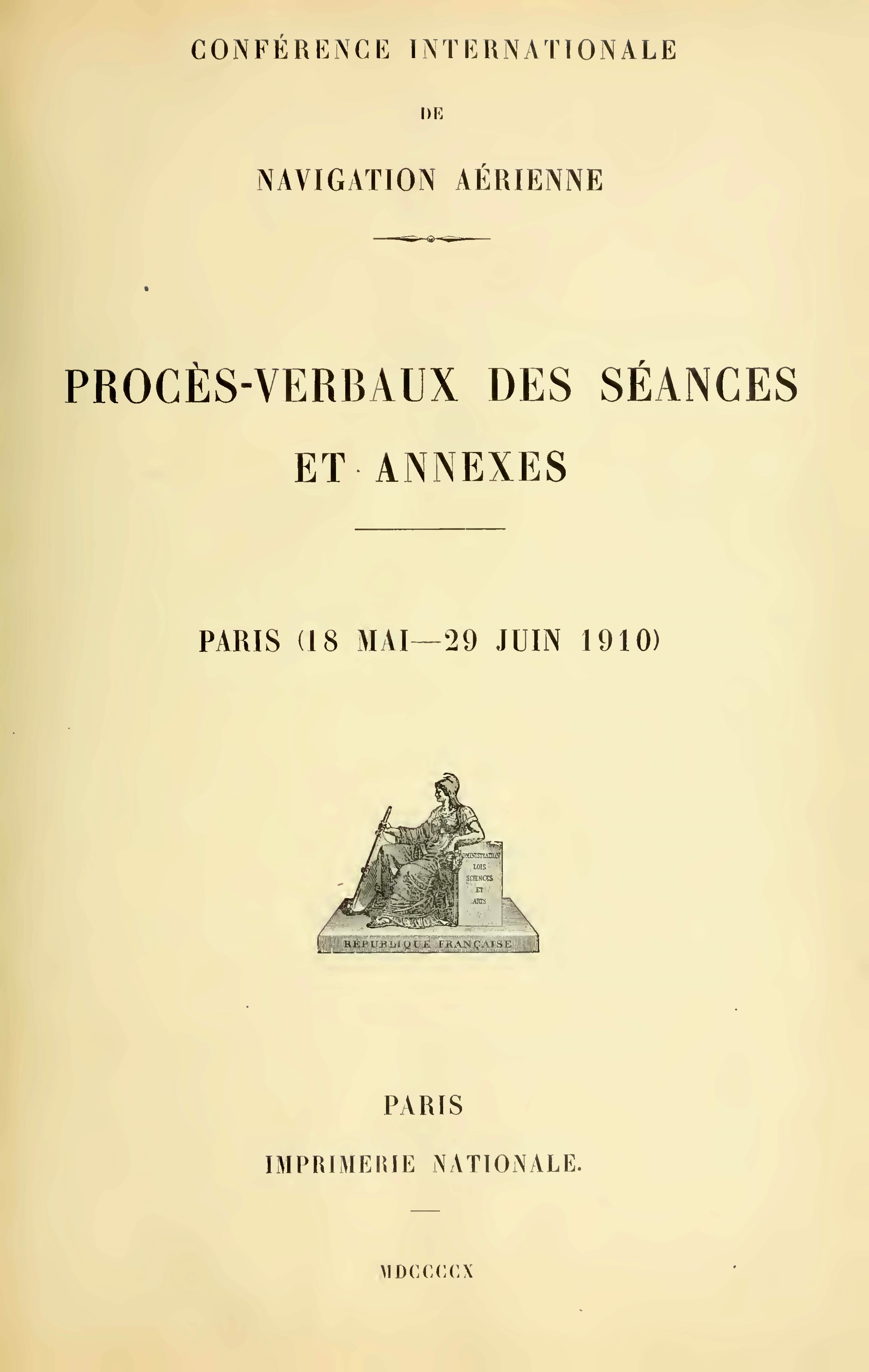
- Procès-verbaux des séances et annexes. Paris (18 mai-29 juin 1910). Paris, 1910.
- Type: Aviation
- Effective: No treaty finalised

The Paris International Air Navigation Conference of 1910, also known as the Conférence internationale de navigation aérienne, was the first diplomatic conference to consider formulating international law about aviation. It was proposed by the French government who were concerned about aircraft from foreign nations flying over their territory and was attended by representatives from 19 European nations.

The key question considered by the conference was whether nations had the right to prevent foreign aircraft flying over their territory. Opinion was divided between those nations that wished a wide freedom of movement for aircraft and those that, for reasons of national security, wished to control which aircraft crossed into their country.

The conference went into recess in June 1910 but did not reconvene due to differences of opinion and then later the outbreak of the First World War. Hence, no agreement was signed. Its deliberations, however, influenced the development of international aviation law.

== Background ==
In 1908, France became concerned about the regulation of aviation after at least 10 German balloons crossed into French territory carrying more than 25 aviators of whom the majority were German officers. The following year, French Minister of the Interior, Georges Clemenceau, issued an order for local authorities to hold any balloons that came their way, detain them to collect customs duties, and to make enquiries as to the purpose of their flight. Although there had been rulings in domestic courts relating to trespassing balloons, and the dropping of munitions from balloons had been previously included in the International Peace Conference of 1899, at the time of the conference in 1910 there was no international law in place about aviation and flights were largely unregulated. In the previous year, Louis Blériot used an aircraft to fly across the English Channel from France to England, without any thought of the legal or diplomatic consequences. During this time, Germany was testing its early Zeppelins and flying them over Switzerland without any permission from the Swiss. Subsequently, French concerns about control of their airspace led them to call for the 1910 conference to develop international regulations covering aviation. At the same time, they aimed to consider the fundamental question of who had the right to fly over a nation's territory.

== Attendees ==
In attendance were representatives of 19 European nations; Austria-Hungary, Belgium, Bulgaria, Denmark, France, Germany, Great Britain, Italy, Luxemburg, Monaco, Netherlands, Portugal, Romania, Russia, Serbia, Spain, Sweden, Switzerland, and Turkey. More distant countries such as the United States were deemed unable to fly as far as Europe, and so not invited to participate.

A questionnaire was sent to each representative prior to the conference in order to establish their preliminary views, however, it avoided the topic of air sovereignty. This question was later added to the conference programme in the same layout as stated in the German preliminary response.

== The Conference ==
The conference was the first political effort to develop the doctrines of international law relating to aerial navigation. Delegates disagreed about the right of foreign aircraft to fly over national territory.

Germany and France supported the idea of wide freedom and national treatment of foreign aircraft. This view was opposed by Britain, Austria-Hungary and Russia, who backed the view there should be complete sovereign right to the overlying airspace for national security reasons.

=== France ===
The French delegation was led by Louis Renault, who was also the president of the conference. Along with Germany, France supported the idea of wide freedom and national treatment of foreign aircraft. However, the French Government held the opinion of Paul Fauchille who stated that "Air navigation is free. Nevertheless subjacent States reserve rights necessary to their self-preservation; that is, to their own security and that of the persons and goods of their inhabitants."

=== Germany ===
Germany had consulted Ferdinand von Zeppelin prior to accepting the invitation, and completed a thorough preliminary document before the conference commenced. They were clear that freedom of airspace was their proposal.

=== United Kingdom ===
The British held the view that there should be complete sovereign right to the overlying airspace for national security reasons. They did not uphold the opinions of British professor of international law John Westlake, who although held the same view to some extent, also advocated the right of innocent passage.

=== Italy ===
The Italian delegates endorsed prohibited zones on a military basis.

=== Russia ===
Russia endorsed free landing, but the need for prohibited zones. It requested that further discussions take place on the question of the rights of a sovereign State in the airspace above its territory.

=== Belgium ===
Clarification as to the rights to the airspace above their lands and waters was requested by Belgium.

=== Agreement ===
By the time the conference adjourned, delegates had agreed the terms of a draft agreement covering:

- Nationality, registration and certificates for aircraft
- Licenses and logbooks for crew
- Rules of the road
- Transport of explosives
- Aircraft equipment
- Provisions for public aircraft

A declaration of prohibited zones was also agreed. There was general agreement that airspace above individual states was under the control of that state and therefore that states may designate airspace zones where international flights would be prohibited. It was the question of what restrictions and to what extent these restrictions could be applied that was not largely agreed.

== Conclusion and legacy ==
The conference went into recess on 29 June 1910 and was planned to reconvene on 29 November 1910, however, due to political differences and, later, the outbreak of the First World War, it never did. The conference therefore ended without a signed agreement.

Despite the absence of a final agreement, an examination of the conference drafts and debates shows that it was decided, in principle, that individual nations had the right to authorise or deny flight over their territory. The conference also identified a number of issues that became significant in future aviation regulations.

The Aerial Navigation Act 1911, passed by the British Parliament, gave Britain authority to close British airspace to all foreign aircraft and the conference's codes resurfaced in the Paris Convention of 1919. It also influenced the Chicago Convention on International Civil Aviation of 1944.

== See also ==
- Cuius est solum, eius est usque ad coelum et ad inferos – "Whoever's is the soil, it is theirs all the way to Heaven and all the way to Hell"
