= Civil Aviation (Eurocontrol) Act 1962 =

Act of the Parliament of the United Kingdom

Civil Aviation (Eurocontrol) Act 1962 (Note: Section 10(1).)
- Act of Parliament
- Parliament of the United Kingdom
- Long title: An Act to make provision in connection with the international convention relating to co-operation for the safety of air navigation, known as the Eurocontrol Convention; to provide for the recovery of charges for services provided for aircraft; to authorize the use of certain records as evidence in proceedings for the recovery of such charges or proceedings under the Air Navigation Order; and for purposes connected with the matters aforesaid.
- Citation: 10 & 11 Eliz. 2. c. 8
- Territorial extent: United Kingdom (Note: Section 10(3).)

Dates
- Royal assent: 21 February 1962
- Commencement: 16 March 1963 (Note: Section 10(2). The Civil Aviation (Eurocontrol) Act 1962 (Commencement) Order 1963.)
- Repealed: 27 August 1982
Other legislation
Amends	Civil Aviation Act 1949
Amended by	International Organisations Act 1968; Civil Aviation Act 1971
Repealed by	Civil Aviation Act 1982

Status: Repealed

Text of statute as originally enacted

The Civil Aviation (Eurocontrol) Act 1962 (10 & 11 Eliz. 2. c. 8) was an act of the Parliament of the United Kingdom that brought the treaty establishing Eurocontrol into effect within the United Kingdom.

== Provisions ==
The intention was to give effect to the International Convention relating to Cooperation for the Safety of Air Navigation, which created Eurocontrol. The act was given royal assent on 21 February 1962. Section 1 of the act brings the treaty into effect, while section 2 establishes Eurocontrol as a corporate body, and section 3 authorises the British Minister for Aviation to pay the United Kingdom's allotted expenses to maintain the organisation. Section 4 allows the Minister to make orders under the treaty setting charges for air navigation assistance offered by the organisation. The act was repealed by the Civil Aviation Act 1982.

== Subsequent developments ==
The whole act was repealed by section 109 of, and schedule 16 to, the Civil Aviation Act 1982, which came into force on 27 August 1982.

== Bibliography ==
- Johnson, D.H.N. (1962). "Civil Aviation (Eurocontrol) Act, 1962". Modern Law Review. 25 (5). Blackwell Publishing. ISSN 0026-7961.
