= Birmingham Airport Police =

Birmingham Airport Police is a defunct police force of the United Kingdom, formerly responsible for policing Birmingham Airport, in Birmingham, England.

== Basis ==
The Airport Police were sworn in under section 14 of the Birmingham Corporation Act 1970. This gave them all the powers and privileges of a constable in the airport, and elsewhere 'for the purpose of arresting any person who they followed from the airport in circumstances in which they could have arrested the person in the airport'. Constables were exempt from jury duty. The Corporation had the power to suspend/terminate the appointment of constables.

In 1975 the force had 29 members. Following the designation of Birmingham Airport under the Policing of Airports Act 1974, responsibility for policing the airport passed from the Airport Police to the local territorial police force, West Midlands Police, on 1 May 1976, and two airport police officers were transferred to West Midlands Police on that date. The remainder were offered transfers to Airport Security.

== See also ==
- Airport policing in the United Kingdom
- Law enforcement in the United Kingdom
- List of law enforcement agencies in the United Kingdom
