= Civil Aviation Act 2006 =

Act of the Parliament of the United Kingdom

Civil Aviation Act 2006 (Note: Section 14(1).)
- Act of Parliament
- Parliament of the United Kingdom
- Long title: An Act to make further provision about civil aviation, including provision about the funding of the Air Travel Trust; and for connected purposes.
- Citation: 2006 c. 34
- Territorial extent: United Kingdom (Note: Section 14(6)–(8).)

Dates
- Royal assent: 8 November 2006
- Commencement: 8 November 2006 (sections 14 and 6); Various (rest of act); (Note: Section 14(2)–(5).)
Other legislation
Amends	Civil Aviation Act 1982; Airports Act 1986; Civil Aviation Authority Regulations 1991; Scotland Act 1998
Amended by	Civil Aviation Act 2012

Status: Amended

History of passage through Parliament

Text of statute as originally enacted

Revised text of statute as amended

The Civil Aviation Act 2006 (c. 34) is an act of the Parliament of the United Kingdom.

The act implemented some of the policies contained in the 2003 white paper entitled "Future of Air Transport".

== Provisions ==
The legislation contains measures relating to:

- aircraft noise
- levies for the air travel trust fund, for compensation for customers of tour operators which have failed
- the linking of airport charges and local emissions from aircraft
- enabling the Civil Aviation Authority to levy a fee against the aviation industry to provide funding for the Aviation Health Unit, to provide advice to the aviation industry, the government and passengers.
- removing the right of appeal for airlines to the Secretary of State in cases decided by the Civil Aviation Authority
