= Asiad Main Stadium =

Asiad Main Stadium may refer to:

- Major Dhyan Chand National Stadium
- Rizal Memorial Stadium
- National Stadium (Tokyo, 1958)
- Gelora Bung Karno Stadium
- Azadi Stadium
- National Stadium (Thailand)
- Jawaharlal Nehru Stadium (Delhi)
- Seoul Olympic Stadium
- Workers' Stadium
- Hiroshima Park Stadium
- Rajamangala Stadium
- Busan Asiad Main Stadium
- Khalifa International Stadium
- Guangdong Olympic Stadium
- Incheon Asiad Main Stadium
- Hangzhou Sports Park Stadium
- Paloma Mizuho Stadium
