= Civil Aviation Act 1949 =

Act of the Parliament of the United Kingdom

Civil Aviation Act 1949 (Note: Section 71.)
- Act of Parliament
- Parliament of the United Kingdom
- Long title: An Act to consolidate the enactments relating to civil aviation, other than the Carriage by Air Act, 1932, and other than the enactments relating to the constitution and functions of the Airways Corporations.
- Citation: 12, 13 & 14 Geo. 6. c. 67
- Territorial extent: United Kingdom

Dates
- Royal assent: 24 November 1949
- Commencement: 24 November 1949 (Note: The Acts of Parliament (Commencement) Act 1793.)
- Repealed: 27 August 1982
Other legislation
Amends	See § Repealed enactments
Repeals/revokes	See § Repealed enactments
Amended by	Statute Law Revision Act 1953; Civil Aviation (Eurocontrol) Act 1962; Police Act 1964; Administration of Justice Act 1965; Rent Act 1965; Police (Scotland) Act 1967; Civil Aviation Act 1971; Town and Country Planning (Scotland) Act 1972; Statute Law (Repeals) Act 1973; Acquisition of Land Act 1981
Repealed by	Civil Aviation Act 1982
Relates to	Air Corporations Act 1949

Status: Repealed

History of passage through Parliament

Text of statute as originally enacted

The Civil Aviation Act 1949 (12, 13 & 14 Geo. 6. c. 67) was an act of the Parliament of the United Kingdom covering civil aviation.

Among other provisions it repealed the Air Navigation Act 1920 (10 & 11 Geo. 5. c. 80), set up a Ministry of Civil Aviation Constabulary and formalised the powers of the Minister of Civil Aviation, including those to regulate and establish aerodromes.

The act reinforced the Air Navigation Act 1947 (10 & 11 Geo. 6. c. 18). The act was used to defend aircraft carrying opium illegally, because according to the act, if a British aircraft broke the law, it would have, "for the purpose of conferring jurisdiction, be deemed to have been committed in any place where the offender may for the time being be."

== Provisions ==
=== Repealed enactments ===
Section 70(1) of the act repealed 12 enactments, listed in the twelfth schedule to the act.

Citation	Short title	Extent of repeal
10 & 11 Geo. 5. c. 80	Air Navigation Act 1920	The whole act.
26 Geo. 5. & 1 Edw. 8. c. 44	Air Navigation Act 1936	The whole act, save sections twenty-four and twenty-six and in subsection (1) of section thirty-five the words 'This Act may be cited as the Air Navigation Act, 1936', and the Fourth Schedule.
1 & 2 Geo. 6. c. 33	Air Navigation (Financial Provisions) Act 1938	The whole act.
2 & 3 Geo. 6. c. 61	British Overseas Airways Act 1939	Section thirty and the Fourth Schedule.
8 & 9 Geo. 6. c. 21	Ministry of Civil Aviation Act 1945	The whole act, save so far as it amends the British Overseas Airways Act 1939.
9 & 10 Geo. 6. c. 28	Assurance Companies Act 1946	In section one, in subsection (1), the words from the beginning to the words 'Part III of that Act and'. In section five, in subsection (1) paragraph (c); in subsection (2) paragraph (c); in subsection (3) the words 'or sub-paragraph (2) of paragraph 7 of the Third Schedule to the Air Navigation Act 1936'. In the Second Schedule the proviso to paragraph 1 of Part I and paragraph (a) of sub-paragraph (2) of paragraph 3 of Part III.
9 & 10 Geo. 6. c. 70	Civil Aviation Act 1946	Part II. Sections thirty-six to forty-six. Sections forty-eight and forty-nine. Section fifty-two. In section fifty-three, subsections (3) to (10), and (12), (13) and (15). Section fifty-four. In section fifty-five, in subsection (1) the words from 'except' to the second 'aerodromes' and from 'For the purposes of' to the end of the subsection. The Third, Fourth, Fifth and Sixth Schedules.
10 & 11 Geo. 6. c. 18	Air Navigation Act 1947	The whole act.
10 & 11 Geo. 6. c. 51	Town and Country Planning Act 1947	At the end of the Eighth Schedule the amendments of the Civil Aviation Act 1946.
10 & 11 Geo. 6. c. 53	Town and Country Planning (Scotland) Act 1947	In the Eighth Schedule the amendments of the Civil Aviation Act 1946.
10 & 11 Geo. 6. c. 1 (N.I.)	Assurance Companies Act (Northern Ireland) 1947	In section one, in subsection (1), the words from the beginning to the words 'Part III of that Act and'. In section five, paragraph (b) of subsection (1) and paragraph (b) of subsection (2). In the Second Schedule, the proviso to paragraph 1 of Part I and sub-paragraph (2) of paragraph 3 of Part III.
S.R. & O. 1936, No. 1378	Air Navigation (Northern Ireland) (Adaptation of Enactments) Order 1936	In the Schedule, the amendments of the First Schedule to the Air Navigation Act 1936.

== Subsequent developments ==
The whole act was repealed by section 109 of, and schedule 16 to, the Civil Aviation Act 1982, which came into force on 27 August 1982.
