= Civil Aviation Act 1982 =

Act of the Parliament of the United Kingdom

Civil Aviation Act 1982 (Note: Section 110(1).)
- Act of Parliament
- Parliament of the United Kingdom
- Long title: An Act to consolidate certain enactments relating to civil aviation.
- Citation: 1982 c. 16
- Territorial extent: United Kingdom

Dates
- Royal assent: 27 May 1982
- Commencement: 27 August 1982 (Note: Section 110(2).)

Other legislation
- Amends: See § Repealed enactments
- Repeals/revokes: See § Repealed enactments
- Amended by: Aviation Security Act 1982; Public Health (Control of Disease) Act 1984; Airports Act 1986; Official Secrets Act 1989; Statute Law (Repeals) Act 1989; Extradition Act 1989; Capital Allowances Act 1990; Planning (Consequential Provisions) Act 1990; Tribunals and Inquiries Act 1992; Statute Law (Repeals) Act 1993; Merchant Shipping Act 1995; Statute Law (Repeals) Act 1995; Employment Tribunals Act 1996; Employment Rights Act 1996; Planning (Consequential Provisions) (Scotland) Act 1997; Transport Act 2000; Anti-terrorism, Crime and Security Act 2001; Statute Law (Repeals) Act 2004; Aviation Safety Regulations 2004; Civil Aviation Act 2006; Companies Act 2006 (Consequential Amendments, Transitional Provisions and Savings) Order 2009; Airport Charges Regulations 2011; Civil Aviation Act 2012; Energy Act 2013; Enterprise and Regulatory Reform Act 2013 (Competition) (Consequential, Transitional and Saving Provisions) Order 2014; Air Navigation (Amendment) (No. 4) Order 2014; Space Industry Act 2018
- Relates to: Civil Aviation (Amendment) Act 1982; Aviation Security Act 1982

Status: Amended

Text of statute as originally enacted

Revised text of statute as amended

Text of the Civil Aviation Act 1982 as in force today (including any amendments) within the United Kingdom, from legislation.gov.uk.

The Civil Aviation Act 1982 (c. 16) is an act of the Parliament of the United Kingdom that consolidated certain enactments relating to civil aviation in the United Kingdom.

== Provisions ==
=== Repealed enactments ===
Section 109(3) of the act repealed 31 enactments and 2 instruments, listed in schedule 16 to the act.

Enactments repealed by section 109(3)
| Citation | Short title | Extent of repeal |
|---|---|---|
| 12, 13 & 14 Geo. 6. c. 67 | Civil Aviation Act 1949 | Section 1. Section 6. Sections 8 to 11. Section 16(1) and (2). Sections 17 to 20. Sections 23 to 35. Sections 37 to 41. Section 49. Sections 51 to 53. Sections 55 to 58. Section 59(1). Sections 60 to 65. Sections 69 to 71. Schedules 1 to 4. Schedules 8 and 9. Schedule 11. |
| 2 & 3 Eliz. 2. c. 64 | Transport Charges &c. (Miscellaneous Provisions) Act 1954 | Section 7(4). |
| 8 & 9 Eliz. 2. c. 38 | Civil Aviation (Licensing) Act 1960 | Section 5(3) and (4). Section 6(6), (6A) and (7). Section 7. Section 10. Section 12. |
| 10 & 11 Eliz. 2. c. 8 | Civil Aviation (Eurocontrol) Act 1962 | Sections 1 to 4. Section 5(1) and (3). Sections 6 to 10. |
| 10 & 11 Eliz. 2. c. 38 | Town and Country Planning Act 1962 | In Schedule 12, the entry relating to the Civil Aviation Act 1949. |
| 1965 c. 56 | Compulsory Purchase Act 1965 | In Schedule 6, the entry relating to the Civil Aviation Act 1949. |
| 1967 c. 52 | Tokyo Convention Act 1967 | Sections 1 to 3. Sections 5 and 6. In section 7, in subsection (1) the definitions of "commander", "Convention country", "military aircraft", "operator", "pilot in command" and "Tokyo Convention", subsection (2), in subsection (3) the words from "and references" onwards and subsection (4). In section 8(1), the words "other than section 2". Section 9(2). |
| 1968 c. 48 | International Organisations Act 1968 | In section 12, subsection (1). |
| 1968 c. 61 | Civil Aviation Act 1968 | Sections 1 to 6. Section 8. Section 12. Section 13(2) and (3). Sections 14 to 23. Sections 26 to 28. |
| 1969 c. 48 | Post Office Act 1969 | In Schedule 4, paragraph 46 and in paragraph 93 subparagraphs (1)(ix) and (2)(e). |
| 1969 c. 59 | Law of Property Act 1969 | Section 28(8). |
| 1971 c. 61 | Mineral Workings (Offshore Installations) Act 1971 | Section 8(4). |
| 1971 c. 68 | Finance Act 1971 | In Schedule 8, paragraph 16(10). |
| 1971 c. 75 | Civil Aviation Act 1971 | Sections 1 to 36. Sections 61 to 70. Schedules 1 to 7. Schedules 9 to 11. |
| 1971 c. 78 | Town and Country Planning Act 1971 | In Part II of Schedule 23, the entry relating to the Civil Aviation Act 1949 and the entry relating to the Civil Aviation Act 1971. |
| 1972 c. 11 | Superannuation Act 1972 | In Schedule 6, paragraphs 94 and 95. |
| 1972 c. 52 | Town and Country Planning (Scotland) Act 1972 | In Part II of Schedule 21, the entry relating to the Civil Aviation Act 1949 and the entry relating to the Civil Aviation Act 1971. |
| 1973 c. 65 | Local Government (Scotland) Act 1973 | Section 152. In Part II of Schedule 27, paragraphs 97, 98, 188 to 190 and 201. |
| 1975 c. 76 | Local Land Charges Act 1975 | In Schedule 1, the entry relating to the Civil Aviation Act 1949, the entry relating to the Civil Aviation Act 1968 and the entry relating to the Civil Aviation Act 1971. |
| 1975 c. 78 | Airports Authority Act 1975 | In section 25, subsection (1). Schedule 3. In Schedule 5, Part I and in Part II paragraph 4. |
| 1978 c. 8 | Civil Aviation Act 1978 | Sections 6 and 7. In section 8, in subsection (2) paragraphs (a) to (d). Sections 9 to 11. In section 14, in subsection (1) paragraph (b) and the word "and" immediately preceding it and subsection (3). In section 15, subsection (1). In Schedule 1, in Part I paragraphs 1 to 3, 6 and 7(2) and Part II. |
| 1978 c. 44 | Employment Protection (Consolidation) Act 1978 | In Schedule 16, paragraph 12. |
| 1979 c. 2 | Customs and Excise Management Act 1979 | In Schedule 4, in Part I of the table in paragraph 12, the entry relating to the Civil Aviation Act 1949 and the entry relating to the Civil Aviation Act 1968. |
| 1979 c. 33 | Land Registration (Scotland) Act 1979 | In section 28(1), in the definition of "deed", the words from "and includes" to "1949". |
| 1980 c. 45 | Water (Scotland) Act 1980 | In Schedule 10, the entry relating to the Civil Aviation Act 1971. |
| 1980 c. 60 | Civil Aviation Act 1980 | Sections 11 to 19. Section 21. Section 26. |
| 1981 c. 38 | British Telecommunications Act 1981 | In Schedule 3, paragraphs 10(1)(e), 11(1)(c) and 29. |
| 1981 c. 61 | British Nationality Act 1981 | In Schedule 7, the entry relating to the Civil Aviation Act 1971. |
| 1981 c. 64 | New Towns Act 1981 | In Schedule 12, paragraph 6. |
| 1981 c. 67 | Acquisition of Land Act 1981 | In Schedule 4, paragraphs 6 and 20. |
| 1982 c. 1 | Civil Aviation (Amendment) Act 1982 | Section 4. Schedules 1 and 2. |
| SI 1973/2095 | Local Government Reorganisation (Consequential Provisions) (Northern Ireland) Order 1973 | In Schedule 1, paragraph 11. |
| SI 1980/1085 | Roads (Northern Ireland) Order 1980 | In the table in paragraph 3 of Schedule 8, the entry relating to the Civil Aviation Act 1949. |

== Subsequent developments ==
The act has been significantly amended since its enactment. The Airports Act 1986 repealed a number of provisions relating to the regulation of aerodromes and charges, including sections 27, 29, 32 to 34, 37 and 40. The Civil Aviation Act 2012 made further amendments, including to section 71 (regulation of provision of accommodation in aircraft) and the exclusion of section 4 (regulation of provision of air navigation services) with effect from 6 April 2013.
