= Civil Aviation Authority (United Kingdom) =

British aviation regulator

- Abbreviation: CAA
- Formation: 1972
- Legal status: Statutory corporation
- Purpose: Aviation regulator
- Location(s): Headquarters: Aviation House, Crawley; London office: Westferry Circus, Canary Wharf, London
- Region served: United Kingdom; British Overseas Territories, Crown Dependencies
- Chief Executive: Rob Bishton
- Chairman: Sir Stephen Hillier
- Parent organisation: Department for Transport
- Website: www.caa.co.uk

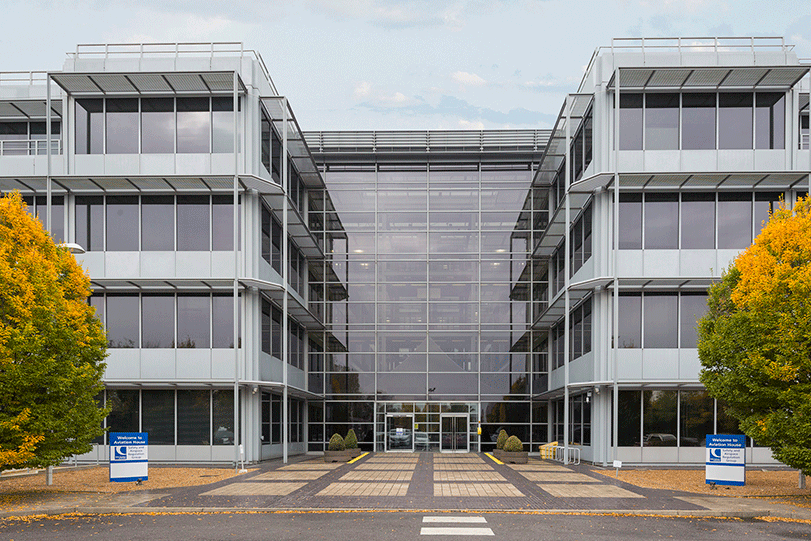
Aviation House, the CAA main office at Gatwick

The Civil Aviation Authority (CAA) is the statutory corporation which oversees and regulates all aspects of civil aviation in the United Kingdom. Its areas of responsibility include:

- Supervising the issuing of pilots and aircraft engineers licences, testing of equipment, calibrating of navaids, and many other inspections (Civil Aviation Flying Unit).
- Managing the regulation of security standards, including vetting of all personnel in the aviation industry (Directorate of Aviation Security).
- Overseeing the national protection scheme for customers abroad in the event of a travel company failure (Air Travel Organisers' Licensing – ATOL).
- Licensing of spaceflight activities in the UK. This includes: Launch, Range Control, Orbital Operators, and Spaceport licence issuing (Space Industry Act 2018).

The CAA is a public corporation of the Department for Transport, liaising with the government via the Standards Group of the Cabinet Office.

== Responsibilities ==
The CAA directly or indirectly regulates all aspects of aviation in the UK. In some aspects of aviation it is the primary regulator.

The UK government requires that the CAA's costs are met entirely from its charges on those whom it regulates. Unlike many other countries, there is no direct government funding of the CAA's work. It is classed as a public corporation, established by statute, in the public sector. The connection it has with the government is via the machinery of government and the Standards Group of the Cabinet Office.

The CAA regulates (approximately):

- Active professional and private pilots (50,000)
- Licensed aircraft engineers (12,400)
- Air traffic controllers (2,350)
- Airlines (206)
- Licensed aerodromes (241)
- Organisations involved in the design, production and maintenance of aircraft (950)
- ATOL holders (2,400)
- Aircraft registered in the UK (19,000)
- Alternative Dispute Resolution providers

=== ATOL ===
The CAA also oversees the Air Travel Organisers' Licensing (ATOL).

By law, every UK travel company which sells air holidays and flights is required to hold an ATOL, which stands for Air Travel Organiser's Licence.

If a travel company with an ATOL ceases trading, the ATOL scheme protects customers who had booked holidays with the firm. It ensures they do not get stranded abroad or lose money.

The scheme is designed to reassure customers that their money is safe, and will provide assistance in the event of a travel company failure.

== History ==
Before 1972, regulation of aviation was the responsibility of the Air Registration Board.

Civil Aviation Act 1971 (Note: Section 70(1).)
- Act of Parliament
- Parliament of the United Kingdom
- Long title: An Act to establish a public authority concerned with civil aviation and to make provision as to the functions of the authority; to make further provision for regulating civil aviation; to establish a corporation with functions which include the function of controlling the activities of the British Overseas Airways Corporation and the British European Airways Corporation and to authorise in certain circumstances the dissolution of either of those Corporations; and for purposes connected with the matters aforesaid.
- Citation: 1971 c. 75
- Territorial extent: United Kingdom

Dates
- Royal assent: 5 August 1971
- Commencement: various (Note: Section 70(2).)
- Repealed: 27 August 1982
Other legislation
Amends	Ministry of Supply Act 1939; Civil Aviation Act 1949; House of Commons Disqualification Act 1957; Public Records Act 1958; Civil Aviation (Licensing) Act 1960; Tanganyika Independence Act 1961; Civil Aviation (Eurocontrol) Act 1962; Jamaica Independence Act 1962; Trinidad and Tobago Independence Act 1962; Uganda Independence Act 1962; Malaysia Act 1963; Kenya Independence Act 1963; Zanzibar Act 1963; Malawi Independence Act 1964; Zambia Independence Act 1964; Malta Independence Act 1964; Gambia Independence Act 1964; Airports Authority Act 1965; Guyana Independence Act 1966; Botswana Independence Act 1966; Lesotho Independence Act 1966; Selective Employment Payments Act 1966; Barbados Independence Act 1966; Selective Employment Payments Act (Northern Ireland) 1966; Industrial Development Act 1966; Parliamentary Commissioner Act 1967; Air Corporations Act 1967; Mauritius Independence Act 1968; Hovercraft Act 1968; Civil Aviation Act 1968; Air Corporations Act 1969
Repeals/revokes	Air Corporations Act 1971; Civil Aviation (Declaratory Provisions) Act 1971
Amended by	Town and Country Planning Act 1971; Town and Country Planning (Scotland) Act 1972; Supply Powers Act 1975; House of Commons Disqualification Act 1975; Northern Ireland Assembly Disqualification Act 1975; Airports Authority Act 1975; Land Drainage Act 1976; British Airways Board Act 1977; Employment Protection (Consolidation) Act 1978; Civil Aviation Act 1980; Highways Act 1980; Acquisition of Land Act 1981; Justice (Northern Ireland) Act 2002; Postal Services Act 2011
Repealed by	Civil Aviation Act 1982

Status: Repealed

Text of statute as originally enacted

The CAA was established in 1972, under the terms of the Civil Aviation Act 1971 (c. 75), following the recommendations of a government committee chaired by Sir Ronald Edwards. The CAA has been a public corporation of the Department for Transport since then. The Air Registration Board became the Airworthiness Division of the Authority.

The Civil Aviation Act 1982 addressed evolving conditions, and currently governs air flight in the UK.

Responsibility for air traffic control in the UK passed to NATS in the run-up to the establishment of its public-private partnership in 2001.

The priorities of the chair, as recorded by letter upon the accession to government of the Cameron–Clegg coalition were, chief amongst others:

- to continue to develop UK State Safety Programme to meet ICAO requirements
- to set a cross-industry agenda in order to address potential safety risks
- to take action to foster a risk-based and proportionate safety management capability
- to work with European and International partners in order to drive global standards in safety improvement

From 1 April 2014, the CAA took over a number of aviation security functions from the Department for Transport. The new Directorate of Aviation Security within the CAA now manages rule-making and compliance to deliver proportionate and focussed regulation for UK aviation to ensure the highest standards of security across the civil aviation sector. Air Safety Support International, a subsidiary of the CAA, is responsible for air safety in the British Overseas Territories. The CAA also manages all national security vetting for the aviation industry.

The United Kingdom was a member of the Joint Aviation Authorities, which became the European Aviation Safety Agency. Following Brexit and a transition period, the United Kingdom left EASA on 31 December 2020. The transport secretary Grant Shapps said "As you would expect from an independent nation, we can't be subject to the rules and laws made by somebody else, so we can't accept rules from the EU commission and we can't accept rulings in terms of court cases from the European court of justice or anybody else, any more than the US would".

=== Leadership ===
==== Chair ====
- Guy Francis Johnson (formerly Secretary of the ARB) succeeded Lord Brabazon as chairman on his retirement. GFJ died in February 1969.
- Sir Nigel Foulkes was chairman of the CAA from 1977 to 1982, coming into the post from five years of chairing the British Airports Authority.
- Sir Roy McNulty (−2009) was in post as chair for eight years until his retirement in 2009.
- Dame Deirdre Hutton (August 2009 – August 2020) was appointed to chair the CAA in 2009 by Transport Secretary Geoff Hoon. and was still posted in 2017.
- Sir Stephen Hillier (August 2020 – ) was approved by Parliament in June 2020 and took the post in August of the same year.

==== Chief executive ====
Andrew Haines was chief executive until 2018 when his term of office was allowed to expire normally. On 30 November 2017, the board appointed Richard Moriarty to replace him. He acceded the job in summer 2018, and served for five years before stepping down.

After a short period serving as joint-interim CEO, on 21 October 2023, Rob Bishton took over as the new chief executive.

== Geography ==
The CAA head office is located in Aviation House on the grounds of Gatwick Airport in Crawley, Sussex. The Authority relocated from its previous London head office in early 2019, moving its head office functions to its existing office at Aviation House, as well as opening a new London branch office at Westferry Circus, Canary Wharf by that July.

The previous £23 million Crawley four-storey HQ opened, with 600 staff, around 1988. At the time, the CAA employed 6,300 people. The building was 115,000 square feet (10,700 m^{2}), being designed by Fitzroy Robinson & Partners, with structural engineers Ove Arup, with interior design by Fletcher McNeece, being built by Bovis Construction. It took 19 months to build, and was built next to the CAA's Telecommunications Engineering Establishment. It was opened on 23 June 1988 by the Duke of Gloucester.

== GA regulation ==
General aviation is an official category that covers a wide range of unscheduled air activity such as flying clubs and training establishments. In 2013 the CAA announced a new approach to regulating GA which will be more proportionate. A new dedicated GA unit was established in 2014 www.caa.co.uk/ga

=== CAA Flying Unit ===
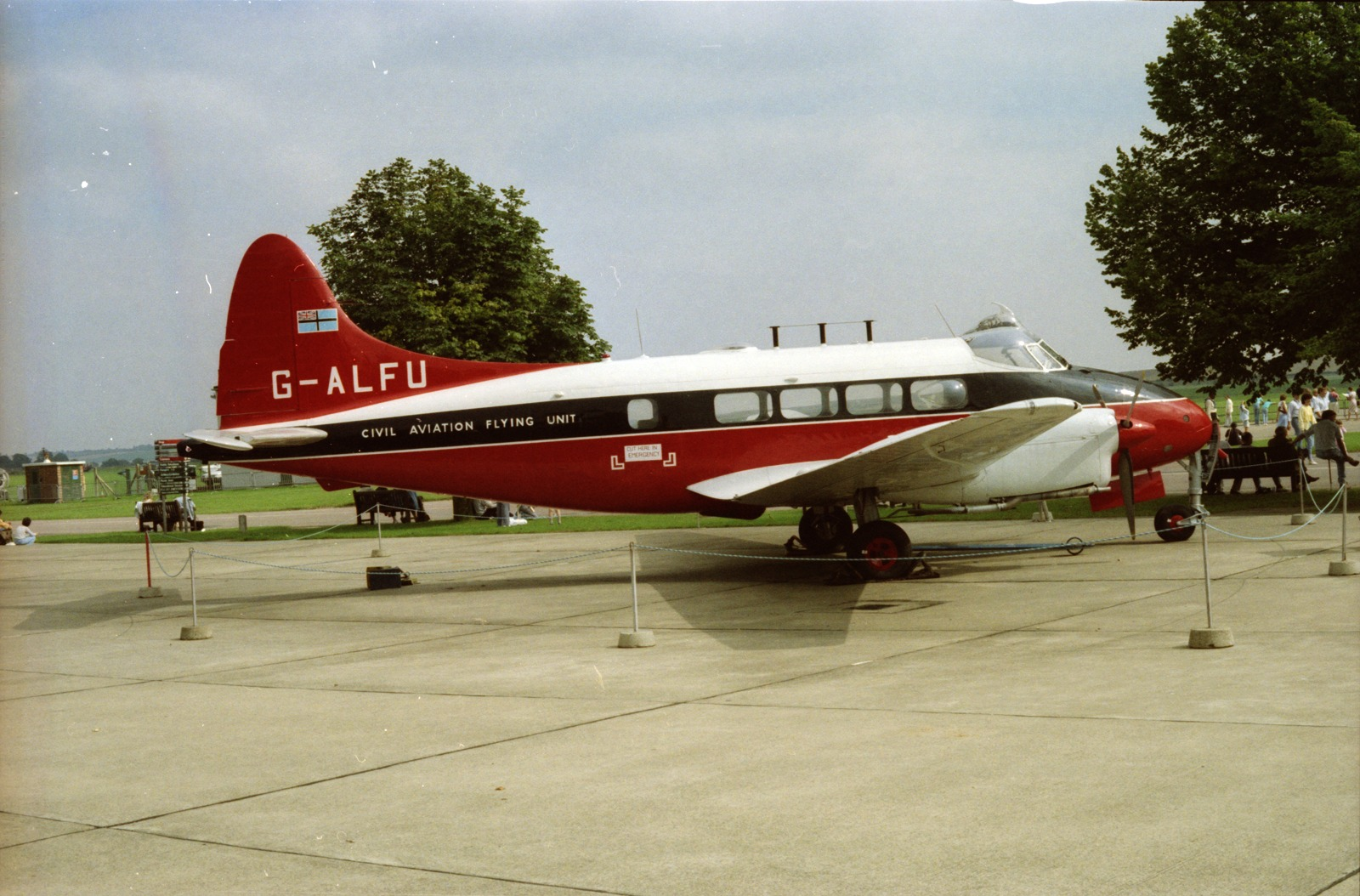
Preserved de Havilland Dove aircraft G-ALFU of CAA at Duxford Airfield, EGSU

The CAA was also responsible for the calibration of navigation and approach aids until the Flight Calibration Services group was privatised and sold to Flight Precision Ltd in 1996.

The history of the Civil Aviation Flying Unit (CAFU) can be traced back to the Air Ministry's Civil Operations Fleet founded in 1944. The CAA and its predecessors have operated 49 aircraft of 13, primarily British, aircraft types including de Havilland Tiger Moths, Avro Ansons, Airspeed Consuls, Percival Princes, de Havilland Doves, Hawker Siddeley HS 748s and Hawker Siddeley HS 125s.

The roles performed by CAFU aircraft included:

- Calibration and testing of radio/radar navigational aids in the UK and overseas
- Flight testing of candidates for the initial issue of commercial pilots' licences, instrument ratings and instructor ratings
- Training and testing of authorised instrument and type-rating examiners
- Carriage of Government Ministers, MEPs and other officials
- Charter flights for Dan-Air Services Ltd
- Radar target flying for the College of Air Traffic Control
- Ordnance Survey photographic flights
- Airport lighting inspections
- Aerodrome categorisation and evaluation flights
- Trials of new equipment and procedures, e.g. Microwave Landing Systems, ground proximity warning systems, Extended Range Twin-engine Operations (ETOPS)
- Refresher flying for Flight Operations Inspectors and other staff
- Educational flights for local schools,

Beyond the privatisation of the calibration service in 1996, the Civil Aviation Authority operated two HS 125-700 aircraft successively up until 2002, providing conversion and continuation flying for professional CAA pilots, conducting radar trials for National Air Traffic Services (NATS) and serving the CAA, NATS and Highlands & Islands Airports Ltd (HIAL) in the communications role.

Previous to the privatisation, Stansted Airport had been the home of Flight Calibration; however, in 1996 the department was moved to Teesside Airport near Darlington, County Durham with the photographic laboratory services contracted out to a local company, HighLight Photographics.

=== CAA Signals Training Establishment (STE) – Bletchley Park ===
In the early 1970s, CAASTE was based in Block D with further Navigation Aid and Radar classrooms on the northwest corner of the park (now occupied by housing). The STE trained technicians to maintain airport and en-route telecommunications and navigational aids for UK airport and en-route services, including telecommunications, navigational aids and radar.

A two- to three-year locally domiciled apprenticeship trained technicians who were then posted to airports or en-route centres for on-going employment. STE also provided training facilities for existing technicians to keep up to date with technological developments or to enhance their skills on a broader range of equipments.

Apprentices had exclusive use of the 'AT Club' (Apprentice Technicians Club) and also to the Bletchley Park 'Radio Shack', based in the old DF hut near the entrance to Block D, with a call-sign of 'G4BWD' – 'Golf Four Building Works Department', able to access the 2-metre band, with a Yagi antenna attached to the remnant of the DF antenna on top of the building, and a "long wire" for HF use.

In 1974, STE developed a newer training course, reducing training to a one-to-two-year period for higher-qualified ('A'-level and beyond) entrants, nicknamed 'Super-ATs' or 'Super-Techs'.

=== CAA College of Telecommunications Engineering (CTE) – Bletchley ===
In 1975/1976, the 'Signals Training Establishment' was renamed the 'College of Telecommunications Engineering', with 'Apprentice Technicians' being re-badged as 'Engineer Cadets', no longer passing out as 'Radio Technicians' but as 'Air Traffic Engineers'.

== See also ==
- Air Accidents Investigation Branch
- Air safety
- Civil Aviation Department (Hong Kong)
- Military Aviation Authority
- Pilot licensing in the United Kingdom
- Strasser Scheme
