= Aviation Security in Airport Development =

Aviation Security in Airport Development (ASIAD) is an anti-terrorism program implemented by the Department for Transport in the United Kingdom to incorporate design elements into airports that will impart resistance to bomb blasts. Components such as heat-strengthened laminated glass are used for windows, security barriers, and terminal facades.

== Designs employed ==
- Bespoke structural bonding of frame to glass.
- Increasing the strength of components for track and door running systems
- Maintaining flexibility and ductility of door frame components
- Restriction of projectile components when high forces of an explosive event occur
- Increasing robustness of drive motors, running gears, and operating systems
- Incorporating combinations of multi-laminated glass at varying thicknesses and with anti-shard glass properties
- Built-in sensors to identify forced opening, etc
- Blast-resistant anti-jump runner systems
- Toughened sensor controls
- Post-blast retained structural barriers to stop physical attacks, unauthorized or forced entrees, or escapes
