= History of law enforcement in the United Kingdom =

The history of law enforcement in the United Kingdom begins with the creation of the united Kingdom of Great Britain in 1707, spans the development of the first modern police force in the world in the nineteenth century, and the subsequent modernisation of policing in the twentieth and twenty-first centuries.

== Background ==
=== England ===
Early concepts of policing were based on the ancient laws which relied heavily on all subjects of the crown having a responsibility to assist in maintaining law and order. The posse comitatus originated in ninth century England along with the creation of the office of sheriff. Henry II of England made an Assize of Arms of 1181 which created an obligation on all freemen of England to possess and bear arms in the service of king and realm. The assize stipulated precisely the military equipment that each man should have according to his rank and wealth.

The Ordinance of 1233 required the appointment of watchmen. The Ordinance of 1252 provided for the enforcement of the Assize of Arms of 1181 and the appointment of constables to summon men to arms, quell breaches of the peace, and to deliver offenders to the sheriff. It expanded the 1181 Assize of Arms by adding the system of watch and ward, and pointing the way forward to subsequent legislation along similar lines by Edward I and Henry IV.

The Statute of Winchester 1285 was the primary piece of legislation that regulated the policing in the period after the Norman Conquest until the nineteenth century. Of particular note was the requirement to raise hue and cry, and that "the whole hundred ... shall be answerable" for any theft or robbery, in effect a form of collective responsibility.

During this period, law enforcement and policing were organised by local communities such as town authorities. Within local areas in England, a constable could be attested by two or more Justices of the Peace, following a procedure that some sources claim had its roots in the Poor Relief Act 1662 (14 Cha. 2. c. 12).

=== Scotland ===
In Scotland, the first statutory police force is believed to be the High Constables of Edinburgh, who were created by an order of the Privy Council of Scotland in 1611 to "guard their streets and to commit to ward all person found on the streets after the said hour".

== History ==
From the 1730s, local improvement acts made by town authorities often included provision for paid watchmen or constables to patrol towns at night, while rural areas had to rely on more informal arrangements. In 1737, an act of Parliament, the Watching (City of London) Act 1736 (10 Geo. 2. c. 22), was passed "for better regulating the Night Watch" of the City of London which specified the number of paid constables that should be on duty each night.

Henry Fielding established the Bow Street Runners in 1749; between 1754 and 1780, Sir John Fielding reorganised Bow Street like a police station, with a team of efficient, paid constables.

In 1800, some town authorities became more involved in improving local policing. The Glasgow City Extension and Improvement Act 1800 (39 & 40 Geo. 3. c. lxxxviii) enabled Glasgow to establish the City of Glasgow Police. As the population in industrial towns grew, more local acts were passed to improve policing arrangements in those towns, such as Rochdale in Lancashire in 1825, and Oldham in 1827. In Ireland, the Belfast Borough Police (1800), Dublin Metropolitan Police (1836) and Londonderry Borough Police (1848) were founded (at this time, all of Ireland was part of the UK.)

=== The City of Edinburgh Police ===
In the early 19th century, social changes in Edinburgh led to a rise in crime. The development of the New Town, and subsequent departure of the middle class from the Old Town led to an influx of rural and immigrant labour and increase in overcrowding. The town council and Lord Provost William Fettes prepared a draft police bill in early 1805 and forwarded it to Parliament. The act (45 Geo. 3. c. 21) received royal assent on 10 April of that year.

The act still used 'police' in a broader sense than the modern meaning, but it implemented a new system of organisation and management with a system of general and residential commissioners overseeing a superintendent and inspectors of police.

In addition to being in command of the new police force, the superintendent was commissioned as a sheriff-substitute by the Sheriff of Edinburgh and a sheriff depute by the Lord Provost of Edinburgh. This gave the superintendent judicial authority which was exercised in a new "Police Court". The first superintendent was John Tait, a Writer to the Signet who had participated in the development of the act. The city was divided into six wards for policing purposes, with an inspector being responsible for each ward. As well as being responsible for administration, the inspector was responsible for prosecuting offenders from his ward before the Police Court. In its first six months of operation, during the latter half of 1805, the Police Court saw 1207 prosecutions. In 1806 the number was 2549. In the majority of cases, Superintendent Tait imposed a fine of ten shillings.

The superintendent's conduct as judge of the Police court faced criticism by the end of 1806. A letter published anonymously that December accused Tait of arbitrarily deciding what was a crime before arbitrarily imposing a punishment. A new act passed in 1812 (52 Geo. 3. c. 172) removed the superintendent's judicial powers, and Tait resigned on 6 July. Instead, the superintendent would now serve as prosecutor before the Police Court, with the bailies serving as judges. On 10 August 1812 a new superintendent, former soldier James Brown, was appointed. Brown would appoint three lieutenants, replacing the inspectors of the old regime as his intermediaries. In 1819 a fourth lieutenant was appointed, with the seniormost being redesignated as a "captain lieutenant". The captain lieutenant carried out the superintendent's administrative and investigative duties while the superintendent was required to wait on the Police Court as prosecutor (for between two and four hours daily). The rank of captain lieutenant was abolished the following year, reducing the number of lieutenants to three.

This system largely remained in force until the passage of a new act in 1822 (3 Geo. 4. c. 128). The duties of the superintendent remained the same, though Superintendent Brown resigned shortly before the new act came into force. He was replaced by James Robinson, also a former army officer. The lieutenants were reduced to two, requiring them to adopt a working pattern of 24 hours on-duty every second day. A third lieutenant was appointed in October 1822 to ease this burden, and the establishment returned to four in 1829. One of the three lieutenants had been restored to the rank of captain lieutenant in 1828. Six "criminal officers" were appointed in 1828, the force's first designated investigators.

The police force lacked a uniform until 1831, when black hats, blue frock coats with a red collar, and grey trousers were issued to the officers on-duty during the day.

=== Robert Peel ===
Sir Robert Peel, appointed Chief Secretary for Ireland in 1812, found local magistrates and the Baronial Police unable to maintain law and order. He set up a Peace Preservation Force in 1814 and a system of county constabularies under the Irish Constabulary Act 1822 (3 Geo. 4. c. 103).

Peel, as Home Secretary, introduced the Metropolitan Police Act 1829 (10 Geo. 4. c. 44), based on the findings of a committee originally set up in 1812, and the Metropolitan Police was founded on 29 September 1829. Whilst the early police force may not have been "openly armed", one William Parker (1790 - 1840), a gunsmith in Holborn, London, is listed as having supplied flintlock and later, percussion pistols for the police organisation. These were marked on the barrel with the police division to which they were issued, e.g. "Police Lambeth Street". The new constables were nicknamed 'peelers' or 'bobbies' after Peel. 'Bobbies' continues to be commonly used in England and Wales.

In November 1830, the Liverpool and Manchester Railway set up their own police establishment. They were to preserve law and order on the construction site and to control movement of railway traffic by hand signals. Signalmen were known as 'bobbies'. This practice spread with the development of railways, and small shelters were erected at these stations, becoming known as police stations.

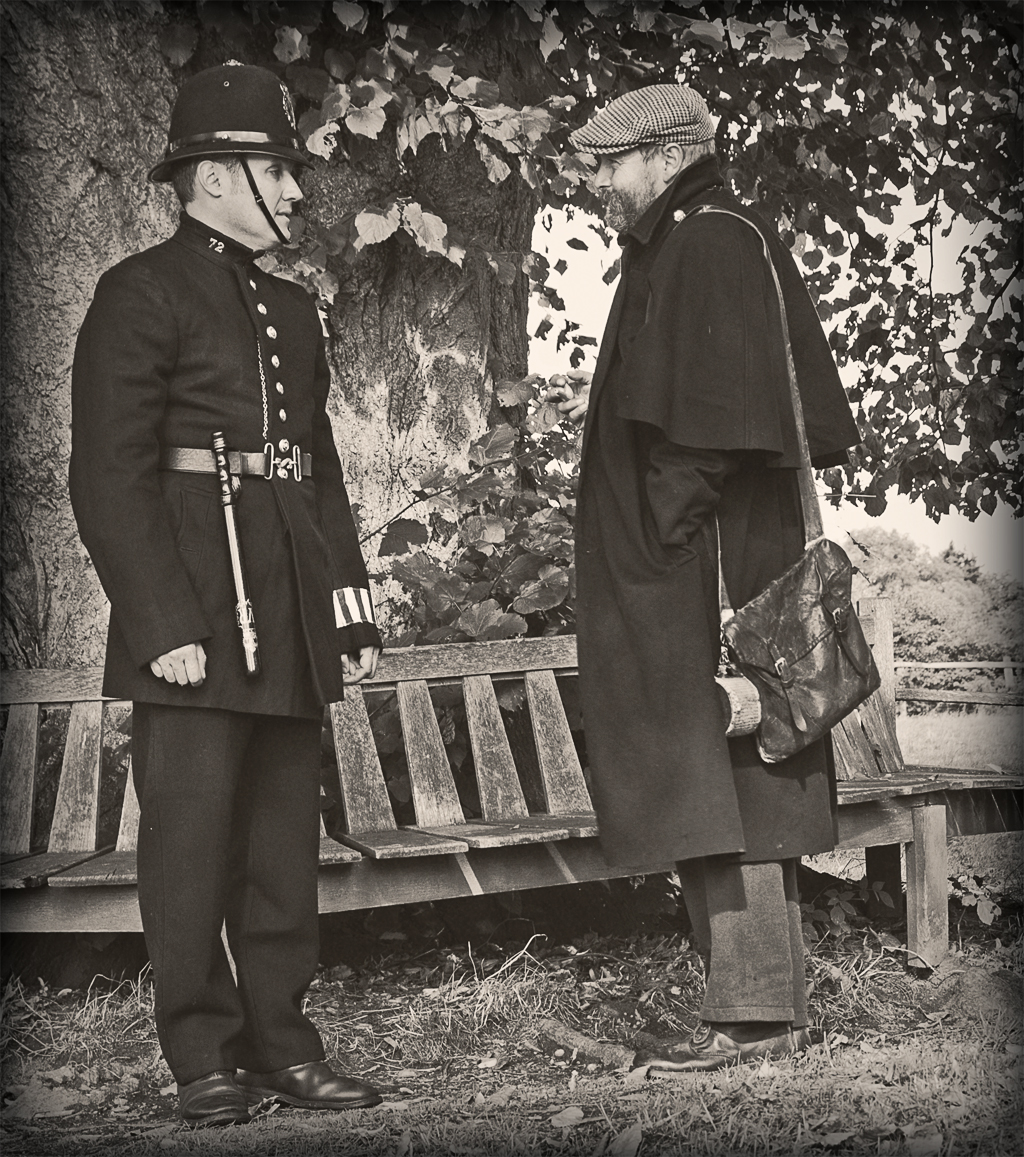
Victorian Police Officer with itinerant circa 1900 - recreation. The officer is pictured wearing a duty armband on his left wrist.

London in the early 1800s had a population of nearly a million and a half people but was policed by only 450 constables and 4,500 night watchmen. The idea of professional policing was taken up by Sir Robert Peel when he became Home Secretary in 1822.

Peel's Metropolitan Police Act 1829 established a full-time, professional and centrally-organised police force for the greater London area known as the Metropolitan Police. The new Metropolitan Police were responsible for an area of 7 miles in radius from the centre of the city (excluding the City of London), which was later extended to 15 miles.

The government intentionally tried to avoid creating any likeness between the police and a military force; in particular the officers of the new police force were not armed, and a blue uniform was chosen that was dissimilar to those used by the army. During this period, the Metropolitan Police was accountable directly to the Home Secretary (whereas today it is accountable to the Mayor of London and the Metropolitan Police Authority).

The City of London was not included within the remit of the Metropolitan Police. The Mayor and Corporation of the City of London refused to be part of a London-wide force because the City of London had certain liberties dating back to Magna Carta. The London City Police was formed in 1832, later renamed by the City of London Police Act 1839 to the City of London Police.

=== Boroughs and counties ===
In the early 1800s, Newcastle had a police force that was accountable to the mayor and council. Liverpool, at the time a city of around 250,000 people, had only watchmen and parish constables for policing; with a small police force for the dock area.

The establishment of more formal policing in cities started to gain more support among the public as cities grew and society became more prosperous and better organised; through better understanding of legal rights, higher standards of education, and better informed through the press.

The Municipal Corporations Act 1835 required 178 boroughs to set up paid police forces. The County Police Act 1839 allowed county areas to establish police forces if they chose to at a local level: Wiltshire was the first county to do this. A further eight county police forces were formed in 1839, twelve in 1840, four in 1841 and another four by 1851.

By 1851 there were around 13,000 policemen in England and Wales, although existing law still did not require local authorities to establish local police forces.

In England the Retford Borough Police are possibly the shortest existing police force, having been formed on 1 January 1836 and then amalgamating with the Nottinghamshire Police on the first day it was allowed to under the County Police Act 1839; its fifth anniversary - 1 January 1841.

=== National policing ===
The UK's first national police force was the Irish Constabulary, established in 1837. It received the appellation Royal Irish Constabulary in 1867 after its success in suppressing the Fenian Rising.

In 1847 two pieces of legislation were enacted – the Town Police Clauses Act 1847 (England and Wales only) and the Harbours, Docks, and Piers Clauses Act 1847. Parliament continued to discuss the idea of national policing and, by the early 1850s, the government was thinking about implementing policing across the nation.

After the County and Borough Police Act 1856, policing became a requirement throughout England and Wales paid for by central government Treasury department funds distributed to local government. In addition, the act formed a "central inspectorate of constabulary" that would assess the effectiveness of each constabulary and report regularly to the Home Secretary. Parliament passed a similar act for Scotland, the Police (Scotland) Act 1857 (20 & 21 Vict. c. 72).

By 1900, England, Wales and Scotland had 46,800 policemen and 243 constabularies.

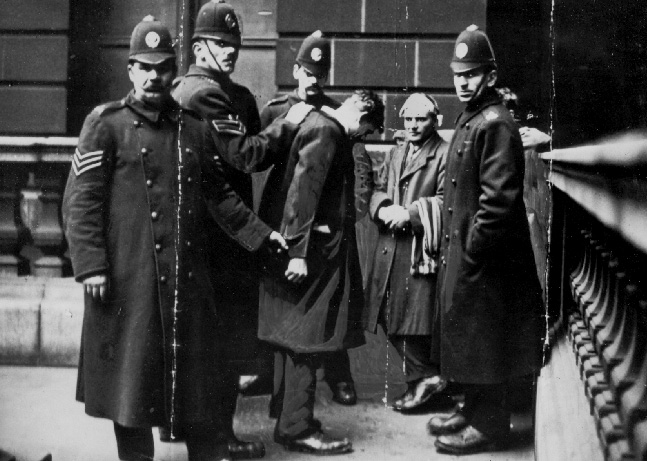
David Kirkwood being detained by police during the 1919 Battle of George Square.

The Police Act 1946 led to the merger of a number of smaller town forces and surrounding county forces, leaving 117 constabularies. Further mergers took place following the Police Act 1964 which cut the number of police forces in England and Wales to 47, and Scotland to 20.

=== Modern policing ===
Chief Constable Captain Athelstan Popkess is credited with being largely responsible for transforming the British Police Service from its Victorian era 'beat policing' model to the modern reactive response model, through his development of the 'Mechanized Division'. Under his stewardship from 1930 to 1959, Nottingham City Police were the first force in the UK to develop the use of two-way radio communication. As early as 1931 they used radios to deploy mobile police patrol cars remotely, and receive updates from them in return.

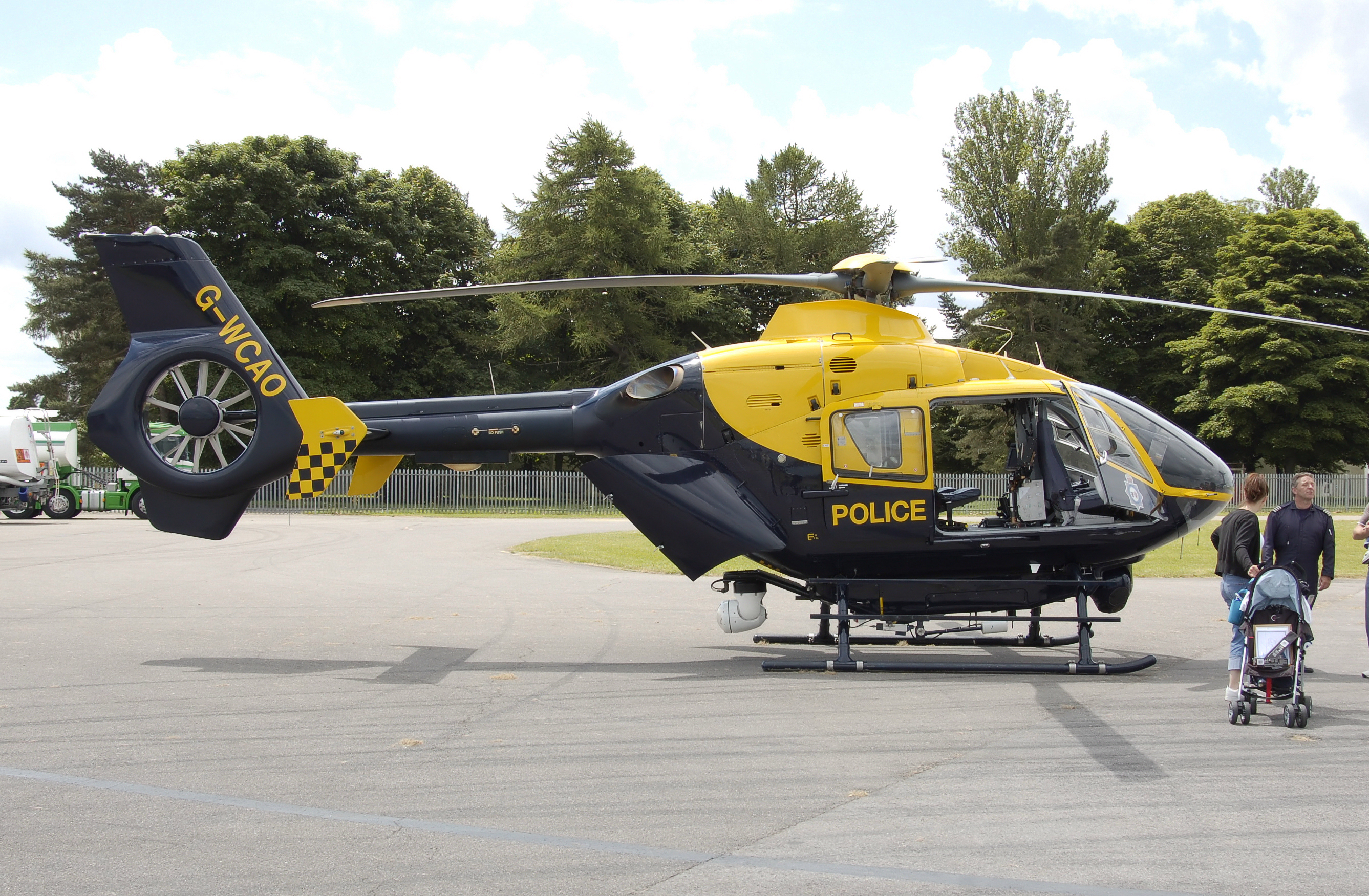
Eurocopter EC 135 T2 providing law enforcement and medical assistance in the Avon and Somerset Police, and Gloucestershire Police areas, based at Bristol Filton Airport.

Popkess and the Nottingham City Police would expand this pioneering method and develop tactics to use it to its full potential, including: overlaying mobile patrol areas on top of several existing foot beats, allowing responding Mechanized Division officers to collect colleagues on foot and take them to incidents; 'snatch plans' to pot up police cars at key road junctions in the event of serious crimes; and 'Q Cars' or 'Q Cruisers', unmarked vehicles disguised as civilian cars or delivery vans for covert patrol.

In 1947 he further linked this to an automated burglar alarm system which reported potential break-ins directly to a police control room where police cars could be deployed instantly to attend.

Since the 1960s, police forces in the United Kingdom have been merged and modernised by several acts of Parliament.

=== Height of officers ===
In the 19th and early 20th centuries most forces required that recruits be at least 5 feet 10 inches (178 cm) in height. Nottingham City Police had a minimum height requirement of 6 feet. By 1960 many forces had reduced this to 5 feet 8 inches (173 cm), and 5 feet 4 inches (163 cm) for women. Many senior officers argued that height was a vital requirement for a uniformed constable. Some forces retained the height standard at 5 feet 10 inches (178 cm) or 5 feet 9 inches (175 cm) until the early 1990s. In May 1990, the minimum height requirement was dropped by the Metropolitan Police, and other police forces had followed suit by September 1990. No British force now requires its recruits to be of any minimum height.

The MacPherson report of 1999 recommended against height restrictions, arguing that they may discriminate against those of ethnic backgrounds who are genetically predisposed to be shorter than average. The shortest officer in the UK, PC Sue Day of Wiltshire Police, is 4 feet 10 inches (147 cm) tall. The tallest is PC Anthony Wallyn of the Metropolitan Police who is 7 feet 2 inches (218 cm) tall. Both officers had to have their uniforms specially made for them due to their size.

== Timeline of selected events ==
Year		England and Wales	Scotland	Ireland (before 1922) Northern Ireland (after 1922)	
1707			At the time of the formation of the Kingdom of Great Britain, only Edinburgh had any sort of police force – the Edinburgh Town Guard that had been formed in 1682 to police the city and enforce an initiated curfew.		
1726			Edinburgh Town Guard gained notoriety when its Captain Porteous became the trigger for the Porteous Riots.		
1749	London's Bow Street Runners established - considered the foundation to all modern police forces.				
1779			Glasgow Magistrates appoint James Buchanan as the first Inspector of the Glasgow Police, with an establishment of eight police officers, though it was disbanded in 1781 due to a lack of money.		
1788			The Glasgow Police re-established, but failure to succeed in getting a bill before Parliament meant that the force again failed, in 1790.		
1798	The Marine Police was established, based in Wapping - a localised force with a limited remit.				
1800			The Glasgow Police Act 1800, the first such act in Britain, was finally passed through the persistence of Glasgow city authorities. This allowed the formation of the City of Glasgow Police, funded by taxation of local citizens, to prevent crime. This was quickly followed by the establishment of similar police forces in other towns.	Belfast Borough Police founded	
1812	A committee examined the policing of London, and made several suggestions on their findings to help evolve the existing state of affairs.				
1814				The Peace Preservation Act 1814 creates the first organised police force in Ireland, becoming the Irish Constabulary in 1822, and was awarded the 'royal' prefix after putting down the Fenian Rising of 1867.	
1817			Edinburgh Town Guard disbanded.		
1818	Further committees examined the policing of London.				
1821	Further committees examined the policing of London.				
1829	Based on the committees' findings, Home Secretary Robert Peel introduced the Metropolitan Police Act 1829, prompting a rigorous and less discretionary approach to law enforcement. The Metropolitan Police was founded on 29 September 1829. The new constables were nicknamed 'peelers' or 'bobbies' after the Home Secretary, Robert Peel.				
1831	Special Constables Act 1831 passed.				
1835	Municipal Corporations Act 1835 passed. The act required each borough in England and Wales to establish a Watch Committee, who had the duty of appointing constables "for the preserving of the peace". The jurisdiction of the borough constables extended to any place within seven miles of the borough.				
1836				Irish Constabulary reorganised under the Constabulary (Ireland) Act 1836; Dublin Metropolitan Police founded.	
1839	County Police Act 1839 passed. First county police force created, in Wiltshire.				
1840	County Police Act 1840 passed.				
1842	Within the Metropolitan Police a detective department is founded.				
1848				Londonderry Borough Police founded.	
1856	County and Borough Police Act 1856 made county and borough police forces compulsory in England and Wales and subject to central inspection by the Inspectorate of Constabulary. By this time around thirty counties had voluntarily created police forces.				
1857			The Police (Scotland) Act 1857 required each Scottish county and burgh to establish a police force, either its own or by uniting with a neighbouring county, the latter was usually the case if the area in question was small and had little means of acquiring such manpower.		
1860	By this year there were over 200 separate forces in England and Wales.				
1867				Irish Constabulary renamed Royal Irish Constabulary after suppressing the Fenian Rising.	
1873				Thomas Hartley Montgomery is hanged for murder, the only policeman in Ireland to receive that punishment.	
1878	As a result of the 1877 Turf Fraud scandal, the Metropolitan Police's Detective Department was reorganised and renamed the Criminal Investigation Department (CID) in 1878.				
1890	Liverpool City Police introduce horse-drawn ambulances.				
1902	Harry Jackson becomes the first person convicted as a result of Fingerprint evidence in London, UK.				
1907	The City of London Police introduce a motorised police ambulance				
1908	North Eastern Railway Police trial the use of police dogs for the first time: PD Jim, with his handler Sgt Allinson.				
1910	For the first time, Police Officers are given one weekly rest day.				
1910	Police dogs used for the first time in a territorial police force Nottingham City Police				
1914–1918	World War I: British police became unionised. During the War, resignations were not permitted except on grounds of ill-health.				
1914–1918	1914	Special Constables Act 1914. Allowed for the appointment of Special Constables during wartime, due to the fall in numbers of regular officers.			
1914–1918	1915	The first warranted female officer Edith Smith takes to the streets in Grantham, Lincolnshire			
1918–1919	Police strike over pay and working conditions.				
1918–1919	1919	Police Act 1919 passed in response to the police striking. The polices' right to strike and form a union was revoked. It criminalised the police union, replacing it with the Police Federation of England and Wales. The act also guaranteed a pension for police where previously it had been discretionary.			
1919–1922	1920			Irish War of Independence. 410 policemen (RIC, DMP and Harbour Police) are killed during the conflict.	Ulster Special Constabulary founded as a quasi-military reserve special constable police force.
1919–1922	1921	An R33 airship is used to support traffic control around Ascot and Epsom Downs racecourses.		Irish War of Independence. 410 policemen (RIC, DMP and Harbour Police) are killed during the conflict.	
1919–1922	1922			Irish War of Independence. 410 policemen (RIC, DMP and Harbour Police) are killed during the conflict.	Following the partition of Ireland; the Royal Irish Constabulary is replaced by the Royal Ulster Constabulary in Northern Ireland, and the Civic Guard (later renamed Garda Síochána) in the Irish Free State.
1923	Special Constables Act 1923 throughout the UK is passed.				
1925	Harry Daley becomes the first openly gay police officer in the UK, joining the Metropolitan Police, despite male homosexual activity being illegal at the time.				
1931	Nottingham City Police trial the first two-way radios and patrolling police vehicles under the direction of the Chief Constable Athelstan Popkess.				
1934	The country's first national forensic science laboratory opens in the Headquarters of Nottingham City Police				
1939-1945	World War II: Women's Auxiliary Police Corps and war reserve constables are introduced.				
1946	Police Act 1946 passed. This abolished nearly all non-county borough police forces in England and Wales. This left 117 police forces.				
1946	Ministry of Civil Aviation Constabulary founded.				
1950-1959	Introduction of personal police radios to individual constables				
1960-1964	The Royal Commission into the Police. The commission results in the Police Act 1964, defining the independence of the police from politics.				
1960-1964	1964	The Police Act 1964 created 49 larger forces in England and Wales, some covering two or more counties or large urban areas. Legal jurisdiction of territorial police officers in England and Wales is expanded to cover England, Wales, and their territorial waters. Jurisdiction was more geographically limited prior to this point.			
1966	Mohammed Yusuf Daar becomes the first non-white police officer in the UK in Coventry City Police				
1968	Sislin Fay Allen becomes the first non-white female police officer, joining the Metropolitan Police.				
1970	Metropolitan Police Helicopter Unit are formed, based at Elstree, Hertfordshire.			Ulster Special Constabulary disbanded.	
1971	Karpal Kaur Sandhu becomes the first female Sikh police officer.				
1974	Local Government Act 1972 amalgamates several constabularies in England and Wales, reducing the number of police forces in England and Wales to 43.				
1974	The Police National Computer is launched				
	The West Midlands Serious Crime Squad is established. They would eventually be disbanded after found tempering with evidence.				
1975			The Local Government (Scotland) Act 1973 amalgamates Scotland's 17 police forces into 8 new forces.		
1975	The Sex Discrimination Act 1975 means that the division between 'women police' and 'men police' ceases to exist				
1977	Corruption at the Flying Squad of the Metropolitan Police leads to the Operation Countryman investigations by Dorset Constabulary and the conviction of Detective Chief Superintendent Kenneth Drury.				
1981	1981 Brixton riot sees large swathes of predominantly the Black community rioting against the police. Officers have no specialist equipment to deal with the riots and hundreds of officers are injured.				
1981	The Brixton riots prompts a review of police riot training, tactics and equipment; eventually leading to shields, flame-proof overalls and NATO helmets for police use.				
1984	Police and Criminal Evidence Act 1984 (PACE). PACE regulated the actions of the police in England and Wales, particularly in relations to arrest and searches/powers of entry. It also instituted the PACE Codes of Practice.		PACE did not extend the regulations of police to Scotland, but dealt with other subjects there.		
1984	The UK miners' strike (1984–85) sees the police face largescale widespread disorder around coal-mining areas, leading to several large clashes between police and miners including the Battle of Orgreave. Margaret Thatcher's Conservative government introduce pay and conditions reforms and recruit thousands more police officers.				
1985	Prosecution of Offences Act 1985 removes the police from prosecuting all but the most minor (mostly road traffic) offences at courts, transferring that duty to the Crown Prosecution Service.				
1988	Colin Pitchfork becomes the first person convicted on DNA evidence of a murder, following an investigation by Leicestershire Police.				
1989	The West Midlands Serious Crime Squad is disbanded. The Serious Crime Squad were shown to have been tampering with statement evidence to secure convictions, and a series of around 100 criminal cases fail or are overturned in the West Midlands, including the Birmingham Six.				
1990	The Metropolitan Police removes its height requirement for constables. Others follow soon afterwards.				
1995	Pauline Clare becomes the UK's first female Chief Constable				
1999			Most police powers and functions in Scotland are devolved to the Scottish Parliament as a result of the Scotland Act 1998.		
1999	The MacPherson report into the murder of Stephen Lawrence describes the Metropolitan Police Service as "institutionally racist".				
2001-2005	Roll-out of Airwave radios undertaken, providing a secure, digital radio network to the police and other emergency services using the O2 mobile phone network.				
2001-2005	2001			Under the Police (Northern Ireland) Act 2000, the Royal Ulster Constabulary continued in force under the new title, the 'Police Service of Northern Ireland (incorporating the Royal Ulster Constabulary)' - to be styled for operational purposes as the Police Service of Northern Ireland.	
2001-2005	2002	Police Reform Act 2002 introduced community support officers, investigating officers, and detention escort officers in England and Wales only. Community support officers are commonly referred to as police community support officers (PCSOs), although the term does not appear in any legislation. None of the new roles are police constables, but they do have certain specific powers of a constable, for example in relation to lawful detention.			
2001-2005	2002	The Soham murders lead to a large-scale review of police intelligence sharing and information processing. This results in the MoPI (Management of Police Information) standards being introduced and leads ultimately to the Police National Database in 2011.			
2001-2005	2003	Michael Fuller becomes the first Black Chief Constable, of Kent Police.			
2006	The Serious Organised Crime and Police Act 2005 comes into effect. The majority of the act applies only to England and Wales, with only a few sections applying to Scotland or Northern Ireland. The Serious Organised Crime Agency is established as part of the act.				
2006	The Serious Organised Crime and Police Act 2005 overhauls powers of arrest and extends powers available to PCSOs in England and Wales.		The Police, Public Order and Criminal Justice (Scotland) Act 2006 comes into force.		
2012	Police and crime commissioners are introduced, replacing police authorities.				
2012	The National Police Air Service is launched, consolidating all police air support in England and Wales.				
2013			All eight remaining Scottish territorial polices forces are amalgamated into a single force: Police Scotland.		
2014	The College of Policing replaces the National Policing Improvement Agency and Centrex to become the professional body for policing.				
2015	Police and crime commissioners are introduced, replacing police authorities.				
2015	Undercover Policing Inquiry				

== Historiography ==
Police History has become an area of study in itself with organisations such as the Police History Society existing since 1985 to further develop this field of knowledge. It is recognised as specialist area of academia; with notable experts including Clive Emsley, Dr Chris Williams, Martin Stallion, and Richard Cowley.

Sub-fields of police history include Ripperologists, a group devoted to looking into cases linked to Jack the Ripper and the state of policing of the time.

An imprint from the publisher Mango Books called 'Blue Lamp Books' specialises in policing history works.

== See also ==
- History of criminal justice § Modern police
- Law enforcement in the United Kingdom
- Crime in the United Kingdom
- Crime statistics in the United Kingdom
- Law of the United Kingdom
