= Police Act 1964 =

Act of the Parliament of the United Kingdom

Police Act 1964 (Note: Section 65(1).)
- Act of Parliament
- Parliament of the United Kingdom
- Long title: An Act to re-enact with modifications certain enactments relating to police forces in England and Wales, to amend the Police (Scotland) Act 1956, and to make further provision with respect to the police.
- Citation: 1964 c. 48
- Introduced by: Henry Brooke
- Territorial extent: England and Wales; Scotland (in part); (Note: Section 65(7).)

Dates
- Royal assent: 10 June 1964
- Commencement: See § Short title, commencement and extent. (Note: Section 65(2).)
Other legislation
Amends	Metropolitan Police Act 1839; City of London Police Act 1839; Town Police Clauses Act 1847; Metropolitan Police Act 1886; Metropolitan Police (Receiver) Act 1895; Police Pensions Act 1921; Thames Conservancy Act 1932; Police (Scotland) Act 1956
Repeals/revokes	Special Constables Act 1831; Special Constables Act 1835; Special Constables Act 1838; County and Borough Police Act 1859; Metropolitan Police Act 1861; Police Act 1890; Special Constables Act 1914; Police Act 1946
Amended by	Police (Scotland) Act 1967; Firearms Act 1968; Statute Law (Repeals) Act 1971; Criminal Justice Act 1972; Statute Law (Repeals) Act 1974; Police Pensions Act 1976; Statute Law (Repeals) Act 1977; Interpretation Act 1978; Acquisition of Land Act 1981; Statute Law (Repeals) Act 1989; Police and Magistrates' Courts Act 1994; Criminal Justice and Public Order Act 1994; Avon (Structural Change) Order 1995; Humberside (Structural Change) Order 1995; North Yorkshire (District of York) (Structural and Boundary Changes) Order 1995; Cleveland (Further Provision) Order 1995; Buckinghamshire (Borough of Milton Keynes) (Structural Change) Order 1995; East Sussex (Boroughs of Brighton and Hove) (Structural Change) Order 1995; Dorset (Boroughs of Poole and Bournemouth) (Structural Change) Order 1995; Durham (Borough of Darlington) (Structural Change) Order 1995; Derbyshire (City of Derby) (Structural Change) Order 1995; Wiltshire (Borough of Thamesdown) (Structural Change) Order 1995; Hampshire (Cities of Portsmouth and Southampton) (Structural Change) Order 1995; Bedfordshire (Borough of Luton) (Structural Change) Order 1995; Staffordshire (City of Stoke-on-Trent) (Structural and Boundary Changes) Order 1995; Police Areas (Wales) Order 1995; Police Act 1996; Leicestershire (City of Leicester and District of Rutland) (Structural Change) Order 1996; Gambling Act 2005; Riot Compensation Act 2016

Status: Partially repealed

Text of statute as originally enacted

Revised text of statute as amended

Text of the Police Act 1964 as in force today (including any amendments) within the United Kingdom, from legislation.gov.uk.

The Police Act 1964 (c. 48) is an act of the Parliament of the United Kingdom that updated the legislation governing police forces in England and Wales, constituted new police authorities, gave the Home Secretary new powers to supervise local constabularies, and allowed for the amalgamation of existing forces into more efficient units.

== Royal commission ==
A Royal Commission on the Police had been appointed in 1960 under the chairmanship of Henry Willink to "review the constitutional position of the police throughout Great Britain".

The appointment of the commission followed two high-profile scandals involving borough police forces. These exposed problems in the relationship between the chief constable and watch committee of each borough, and disputes between central and local government over the control of local forces. In 1958, following a trial into police corruption in Brighton, the presiding judge stated that the judiciary could have no faith in police evidence until the chief constable had been replaced. Brighton Watch Committee complained that they could not properly supervise the force, as they had no access to the annual report of Her Majesty's Inspectorate of Constabulary, which was sent to the Home Secretary. In 1959, the watch committee of Nottingham suspended the city's chief constable, Athelstan Popkess, when he refused to furnish a report on his investigations into alleged corruption of councillors. Details of the investigation were however leaked to the press on the eve of municipal elections. The committee were subsequently forced to reinstate Popkess when the Home Secretary, Rab Butler, threatened to withdraw central government funding.

Among the particular subjects for investigation by the commission were:

- The constitution and functions of police authorities
- The accountability of police officers including chief constables
- The relationship of the police to the public and procedures for dealing with complaints
- The remuneration of police constables

The commission published its final report on 31 May 1962. This recommended an urgent review on the number and size of police areas. Among its recommendations were:

- No single national force was to be formed, but central government should exercise more powers over local forces
- Retention of small police forces of between 200 and 350 officers "justifiable only by special circumstances such as the distribution of the population and the geography of the area"
- The optimum size for a police force was more than 500 members, with the police area having a population of at least 250,000
- There was "a case" for single police forces for major conurbations
- A large reduction in the number of forces in Scotland was needed, to between 20 and 33

The commission noted that of 158 police forces in Great Britain, 97 had an establishment of less than 350.

== Provisions ==
The act received royal assent on 10 June 1964. Among its provisions were:

- England and Wales, outside London, was to consist of "police areas". These were to be administrative counties, county boroughs or "combined police areas", consisting of combinations of counties and county boroughs.
- The Home Secretary had the power to force compulsory amalgamation schemes from 1 July 1964.
- New "police authorities" were to be established: these were to be known as watch committees (in boroughs), police committees (in counties – replacing joint standing committees) or combined police authorities.
- Police authorities were to consist of two-thirds elected members and one-third magistrates. Previously all members of watch committees had been councillors or aldermen, while county joint standing committees were fifty per cent county councillors and aldermen, fifty per cent magistrates.
- The police authorities had fewer powers than their predecessors, especially the boroughs, with the Home Secretary taking on more supervision than before. The authority were required to maintain an efficient police force, but had no operational role.
- Chief constables were given the power to appoint, direct and control special constables.
- The chief constable could appoint police cadets with the permission of the authority.
- The chief constable was required to make an annual report to the police authority.
- A police authority could also request other reports on policing in the police area.
- Police authorities were empowered to choose chief constables, deputy and assistant chief constables from a Home Office shortlist. They could also require the chief constable to retire, subject to the Home Secretary's approval.
- The Home Secretary could order a complaint against a police force to be investigated by officers of another force.

=== Repealed enactments ===
Section 64(3) of the act repealed 81 enactments, listed in parts I and II of the schedule 10 to the act.

Part I - Repeals not extending to Scotland
Citation	Short title	Extent of repeal
41 Geo. 3. (U.K.) c. 78	Constables Expenses Act 1801	The whole act.
10 Geo. 4. c. 44	Metropolitan Police Act 1829	In section 4, the words from "shall be sworn" to "made, and". In section 5, the words from "and the said justices" to the end. In section 12, the words from "and the receiver" to "exertion".
1 & 2 Will. 4. c. 41	Special Constables Act 1831	The whole act.
5 & 6 Will. 4. c. 43	Special Constables Act 1835	The whole act.
1 & 2 Vict. c. 80	Special Constables Act 1838	The whole act.
2 & 3 Vict. c. 47	Metropolitan Police Act 1839	Section 5. Sections 8 and 9. Sections 14 to 18.
2 & 3 Vict. c. xciv	City of London Police Act 1839	In section 9, the words from "shall be sworn" to "made, and". Section 13. In section 14, the words from "and shall from time to time" to the end. Sections 15 to 17. Sections 19 and 24.
2 & 3 Vict. c. 93	County Police Act 1839	The whole act.
3 & 4 Vict. c. 88	County Police Act 1840	The whole act.
5 & 6 Vict. c. 109	Parish Constables Act 1842	The whole act.
10 & 11 Vict. c. 89	Town Police Clauses Act 1847	Sections 6 to 14. Sections 16 and 20.
15 & 16 Vict. c. cx	Tyne Improvement Act 1852	In section 28, the words from "and every such Police Constable" to "respecting the Constables to be appointed in pursuance of that Act" and the words from "shall, upon the said River" to "made, and".
19 & 20 Vict. c. 69	County and Borough Police Act 1856	The whole act.
19 & 20 Vict. c. xvii	Cambridge Award Act 1856	Sections 51 to 55.
20 Vict. c. 2	County Police Act 1857	The whole act.
22 & 23 Vict. c. 32	County and Borough Police Act 1859	The whole act.
23 & 24 Vict. c. 135	Metropolitan Police Act 1860	The whole act, except as applied by the Special Constables Act 1923.
24 & 25 Vict. c. 51	Metropolitan Police Act 1861	The whole act.
24 & 25 Vict. c. 100	Offences against the Person Act 1861	In section 38, the words from "or shall assault, resist" to "such officer,".
34 & 35 Vict. c. 87	Sunday Observation Prosecution Act 1871	Section 2. The Schedule.
34 & 35 Vict. c. 96	Pedlars Act 1871	In section 3, the definitions of "police district" and "chief officer of police". Schedule 1.
34 & 35 Vict. c. 112	Prevention of Crimes Act 1871	Section 12. In section 20, the definitions of "police district" and "chief officer of police".
35 & 36 Vict. c. 92	Parish Constables Act 1872	The whole act.
38 & 39 Vict. c. 17	Explosives Act 1875	Section 107.
38 & 39 Vict. c. 28	Metropolitan Police Staff (Superannuation) Act 1875	In section 2 the words from "Where any superannuation" to the end.
45 & 46 Vict. c. 50	Municipal Corporations Act 1882	Part IX except section 193. In Schedule 5, in Part II, paragraph 5.
46 & 47 Vict. c. 34	Cheap Trains Act 1883	In section 8, the definitions of "police force" and "police authority".
46 & 47 Vict. c. 44	Borough Constables Act 1883	The whole act.
47 & 48 Vict. c. 58	Prosecution of Offences Act 1884	Section 4.
48 & 49 Vict. c. 75	Prevention of Crimes Amendment Act 1885	The whole act.
49 & 50 Vict. c. 38	Riot (Damages) Act 1886	In section 5, in subsection (1), the words from "and the amount" to the end; and subsections (2) and (4). Section 8. Schedule 1.
51 & 52 Vict. c. 41	Local Government Act 1888	In section 3 in paragraph (iv) the words "lock-up houses" and "police stations", and paragraph (xiv). Section 9. Section 30. Section 34(3)(c). Section 66. In section 78(1) the words "either alone or jointly with the quarter sessions". Section 81(7) and (8). Section 93.
53 & 54 Vict. c. 45	Police Act 1890	The whole act.
53 & 54 Vict. c. 59	Public Health Acts Amendment Act 1890	In section 51, in paragraph 13, the definitions of "police district" and "chief officer of police".
55 & 56 Vict. c. 38	Police Returns Act 1892	The whole act.
6 Edw. 7. c. 32	Dogs Act 1906	Section 3(10).
9 Edw. 7. c. 30	Cinematograph Act 1909	Section 2(6).
10 Edw. 7 & 1 Geo. 5. c. 13	Police (Weekly Rest-Day) Act 1910	The whole act.
4 & 5 Geo. 5. c. 34	Police Reservists (Allowances) Act 1914	Section 1(5).
4 & 5 Geo. 5. c. 61	Special Constables Act 1914	The whole act.
6 & 7 Geo. 5. c. 50	Larceny Act 1916	In section 46(1), in the definition of "chief officer of police", paragraphs (a), (b) and (c).
9 & 10 Geo. 5. c. 84	County and Borough Police Act 1919	The whole act.
10 & 11 Geo. 5. c. clxxiii	Port of London (Consolidation) Act 1920	Section 286.
11 & 12 Geo. 5. c. 31	Police Pensions Act 1921	Section 30. Schedule 3.
13 & 14 Geo. 5. c. 11	Special Constables Act 1923	Sections 1 and 2.
21 & 22 Geo. 5. c. 45	Local Government (Clerks) Act 1931	Section 5(4). In section 15 the definition of "Joint committee".
22 & 23 Geo. 5. c. xxxvii	Thames Conservancy Act 1932	Section 98.
23 & 24 Geo. 5. c. 12	Children and Young Persons Act 1933	In section 107(1), the definition of "police authority".
23 & 24 Geo. 5. c. 51	Local Government Act 1933	Section 157(2). In section 159(1) the words from "including" to the end. In section 305 the definition of "Standing joint committee".
1 Edw. 8. & 1 Geo. 6. c. 6	Public Order Act 1936	In section 9(1), the definition of "chief officer of police".
1 Edw. 8. & 1 Geo. 6. c. 12	Firearms Act 1937	In section 32(1), in the definition of "area" the words from "as defined" to the end, and the definition of "chief officer of police".
2 & 3 Geo. 6. c. 44	House to House Collections Act 1939	In section 11(1) the definitions of "police area", "police authority" and "chief officer of police".
2 & 3 Geo. 6. c. 103	Police and Firemen (War Service) Act 1939	In section 10(3), the definition of "chief officer of a police force". In section 14, in the definitions of "appropriate authority" and "constable" the words "within the meaning of the Police Pensions Act 1921".
8 & 9 Geo. 6. c. 11	Police (His Majesty's Inspectors of Constabulary) Act 1945	The whole act.
9 & 10 Geo. 6. c. 46	Police Act 1946	The whole act.
9 & 10 Geo. 6. c. 49	Acquisition of Land (Authorisation Procedure) Act 1946	In Schedule 4, the entry relating to the Police Act 1946.
9 & 10 Geo. 6. c. 62	National Insurance (Industrial Injuries) Act 1946	In section 78, the words "within the meaning of the Police Pensions Act 1921".
10 & 11 Geo. 6. c. 41	Fire Services Act 1947	In section 38(1), the definitions of "chief officer of police", "police area", "police authority" and "police force".
12, 13 & 14 Geo. 6. c. 5	Civil Defence Act 1948	In section 3(3), the words from "that is to say" to the end. In section 9(1), the definition of "police force".
12, 13 & 14 Geo. 6. c. 67	Civil Aviation Act 1949	In Schedule 6, paragraph 8(4).
12, 13 & 14 Geo. 6. c. 68	Representation of the People Act 1949	Section 87(3)(a).
14 Geo. 6. c. 21	Miscellaneous Financial Provisions Act 1950	Section 3.
14 Geo. 6. c. 36	Diseases of Animals Act 1950	In section 84(4) the definition of "police area" and "police force".
14 & 15 Geo. 6. c. 65	Reserve and Auxiliary Forces (Protection of Civil Interests) Act 1951	In section 23(1) the definition of "police force" and, in the definition of "relevant police authority" the words from "maintained" to "other police force" and the words "(within the meaning of the Police Pensions Act 1921)". In Schedule 2, in Part I, in paragraph 4, in column 2, the words from the beginning to "any other police force" and the words "(within the meaning of the Police Pensions Act 1921)".
15 & 16 Geo. 6. & 1 Eliz. 2. c. 55	Magistrates' Courts Act 1952	In section 109(6) the words from "the expression 'police authority'" to "1921; and".
5 & 6 Eliz. 2. c. 1	Police, Fire and Probation Officers Remuneration Act 1956	Section 1(1)(a).
6 & 7 Eliz. 2. c. 55	Local Government Act 1958	In Schedule 8, paragraph 18.
8 & 9 Eliz. 2. c. 16	Road Traffic Act 1960	Section 202(3). In section 257(1) the definition of "chief officer of police".
8 & 9 Eliz. 2. c. 63	Road Traffic and Roads Improvement Act 1960	In section 2, in subsection (8) the words from "and any proceedings" to the end, and in subsection (10) the words from "and" to "to those expenses".
1963 c. 2	Betting, Gaming and Lotteries Act 1963	In Schedule 2, paragraph 1(5), paragraph 3(1) and in paragraph 3(2) the word "other". In Schedule 3, in paragraph 1(b), the words "except in sub-paragraph 5(b) of the said paragraph 1."

Part II - Repeals extending to Scotland
Citation	Short title	Extent of repeal
4 & 5 Geo. 5. c. 44	Metropolitan Police (Employment in Scotland) Act 1914	The whole act, except as applied by the Special Constables Act 1923.
9 & 10 Geo. 5. c. 46	Police Act 1919	The whole act.
11 & 12 Geo. 5. c. 31	Police Pensions Act 1921	The whole act except sections 10 and 30 and Schedule 3.
13 & 14 Geo. 5. c. 11	Special Constables Act 1923	In section 5 the words from "and the" to the end.
17 & 18 Geo. 5. c. 19	Police (Appeals) Act 1927	The whole act except in relation to any punishment imposed before the commencement of this act.
6 & 7 Geo. 6. c. 8	Police (Appeals) Act 1943	The whole act except in relation to any punishment imposed before the commencement of this act.
15 & 16 Geo. 6. & 1 Eliz. 2. c. 61	Prisons (Scotland) Act 1952	Section 13.
4 & 5 Eliz. 2. c. 26	Police (Scotland) Act 1956	In section 1, subsections (2), (3), (4) and (7). Section 10(3).
7 & 8 Eliz. 2. c. 38	Police Federation Act 1959	The whole act.
9 & 10 Eliz. 2. c. 51	Police Federation Act 1961	The whole act.
10 & 11 Eliz. 2. c. 25	Police Federations Act 1962	The whole act.

=== Short title, commencement and extent ===
Section 65(1) of the act provided that the act may be cited as the "Police Act 1964".

Section 65(2) of the act provided that the act would come into force on a day appointed by the home secretary. Section 65(3) of the act provided that this may be different days for different sections of the act. Section 65(4) of the act provided that such an order may make transitionary provisions as deemed necessary.

The Police Act 1964 (Commencement No. 1) Order 1964 (SI 1964/873) and the Police Act 1964 (Commencement No. 2) Order 1964 (SI 1964/874) provided the commencement dates for the act.

Police Act 1964 (Commencement No. 1) Order 1964 (Note: Section 4.)
- Statutory Instrument
- Parliament of the United Kingdom
- Citation: SI 1964/873

Dates
- Made: 16 June 1964

Status: Current legislation

Text of statute as originally enacted

Police Act 1964 (Commencement No. 2) Order 1964 (Note: Section 1.)
- Statutory Instrument
- Parliament of the United Kingdom
- Citation: SI 1964/874

Dates
- Made: 16 June 1964

Status: Current legislation

Text of statute as originally enacted

Section 65(5) of the act provided that the following enactments would extend to Scotland: part III, section 59 and schedule 7, section 63 and schedule 9, so far as they relate to enactments extending to Scotland, section 64 and Part II of schedule 10, and section 65.

Section 65(6) of the act provided that the act would not extend to Northern Ireland.

== Amalgamations ==
On 10 July 1964, the Home Secretary, Henry Brooke, announced he would be using his powers under the act to amalgamate the county borough forces of Luton and Northampton with the county forces of Bedfordshire and Northamptonshire respectively.

Luton's force had only been formed on 1 April, when it became a county borough, but Mr Brooke said he did not regard the continuance of its existence as in the best interests of policing efficiency. The amalgamations were vigorously, but unsuccessfully, opposed by the boroughs: Luton's campaign went as far as serving a High Court writ on the Home Secretary in an attempt to stop the merger.

In the meantime, the first amalgamation under the act took place on 1 April 1965 as the result of local government reorganisation, with the formation of the Mid Anglia Constabulary.

Following a change in government at the general election, Frank Soskice became Home Secretary. In 1965 he announced that Exeter City's force would be merged with that of Devon. In addition to the Bedfordshire/Luton, Devon/Exeter, and Northamptonshire/Northampton mergers, 1966 saw the establishment of a new West Midlands Constabulary covering the county boroughs of Dudley, Walsall, Warley, West Bromwich and Wolverhampton, which had been constituted or enlarged by local government reorganisation.

=== 1966 amalgamation scheme ===
On 16 May 1966, the new Home Secretary, Roy Jenkins announced that the number of police forces in England and Wales was to be reduced from 117 to 49. Where the local authorities concerned did not agree a voluntary scheme he would make a compulsory amalgamation.

==== Proposed amalgamations ====
1. Lancashire County Constabulary, Barrow-in-Furness Borough Police, Blackburn Borough Police, Blackpool Borough Police, Bolton Borough Police, Burnley Borough Police, Oldham Borough Police, Rochdale Borough Police, St Helens Borough Police, Southport Borough Police, Warrington Borough Police and Wigan Borough Police
2. Manchester Borough Police, Salford Borough Police and Stockport Borough Police
3. Bootle Borough Police and Liverpool City Police
4. Cheshire County Constabulary (Note: Existing combined force) and Wallasey Borough Police and Birkenhead Borough Police
5. Cumberland and Westmorland Constabulary to merge with Carlisle City Police
6. Durham County Constabulary and Sunderland Borough Police
7. Yorkshire North Riding Constabulary and Teesside Borough Police
8. Sheffield City Police and Rotherham Borough Police
9. Yorkshire West Riding Constabulary, Barnsley Borough Police, Bradford Borough Police, Dewsbury Borough Police, Doncaster Borough Police, Halifax Borough Police, Huddersfield Borough Police and Wakefield Borough Police
10. Yorkshire East Riding Constabulary and Kingston upon Hull City Police and York City Police
11. Worcestershire County Constabulary, Herefordshire County Constabulary, Shropshire County Constabulary and Worcester City Police
12. Leicestershire and Rutland Constabulary and Leicester City Police
13. Staffordshire County Constabulary and Stoke-on-Trent City Police
14. Derbyshire County Constabulary and Derby Borough Police
15. Warwickshire County Constabulary and Coventry City Police
16. Lincolnshire Constabulary, Lincoln City Police and Grimsby Borough Police
17. Nottinghamshire County Constabulary and Nottingham City Police
18. Norfolk County Constabulary, Norwich City Police and Great Yarmouth Borough Police
19. East Suffolk Constabulary, West Suffolk Constabulary and Ipswich Borough Police
20. East Sussex Constabulary, West Sussex Constabulary, Brighton Borough Police, Eastbourne Borough Police and Hastings Borough Police
21. Essex Constabulary and Southend-on-Sea Borough Police
22. Berkshire Constabulary, Buckinghamshire Constabulary, Oxfordshire Constabulary, Oxford City Police and Reading Borough Police
23. Somerset County Constabulary and Bath City Police (voluntary scheme agreed)
24. Bournemouth Borough Police and Dorset Constabulary
25. Portsmouth City Police, Southampton City Police and Hampshire and Isle of Wight Constabulary
26. Cornwall Constabulary, Devon and Exeter Police and Plymouth City Police
27. Denbighshire Constabulary, Flintshire Constabulary and Gwynedd Constabulary
28. Glamorgan Constabulary, Merthyr Tydfil Borough Police, Cardiff Borough Police and Swansea Borough Police
29. Pembrokeshire Constabulary, Cardiganshire and Carmarthenshire Constabulary and Mid Wales Constabulary
30. Monmouthshire Constabulary and Newport Borough Police
- It was also envisaged that the forces of Gateshead, Newcastle upon Tyne, South Shields and Tynemouth would be combined into a single Tyneside force if the recommendations of the Local Government Commission for England were carried into effect.

=== Amalgamations carried out ===
The amalgamations carried out under the act differed slightly from the original scheme announced in 1966. In Yorkshire, The North and East Riding constabularies were combined with York City Police, while the borough forces of Hull and Teesside were allowed to continue unmerged. Stockport Borough Police were amalgamated with the Cheshire Constabulary instead of with Manchester and Salford, and the scheme for a Tyneside force was dropped when the Local Government Commission's recommendations were not carried out. Instead Northumberland Constabulary was merged with the two county boroughs north of the Tyne, and Durham Constabulary absorbed those on south Tyneside.

Date	New force	Old forces
1 April 1965 (Note: The force's foundation coincided with the creation of the two new administrative counties of Cambridgeshire and Isle of Ely and Huntingdon and Peterborough. In 1974 these merged to form the non-metropolitan county of Cambridgeshire and the force was renamed accordingly.)	Mid Anglia Constabulary	Cambridgeshire Constabulary, Cambridge City Police, Huntingdonshire Constabulary, Isle of Ely Constabulary, Peterborough Combined Police
1 April 1966	Bedfordshire and Luton Constabulary	Bedfordshire, Luton Borough Police
1 April 1966	Northampton and County Constabulary	Northamptonshire, Northampton Borough Police
1 April 1966	West Midlands Constabulary	Dudley Borough Police, Walsall Borough Police, Wolverhampton Borough Police; also areas from Staffordshire Constabulary, Worcestershire Constabulary.
1 October 1966	Devon and Exeter Police	Devon Constabulary, Exeter City Police
1 January 1967	Somerset and Bath Constabulary	Somerset Constabulary, Bath City Police
1 April 1967	Cumbria Constabulary	Cumberland and Westmorland Constabulary, Carlisle City Police
1 April 1967	Derby County and Borough Constabulary	Derbyshire Constabulary, Derby Borough Police
1 April 1967	Devon and Cornwall Constabulary	Devon and Exeter Police, Plymouth City Police, Cornwall Constabulary
1 April 1967	Durham County Constabulary	Durham County, Sunderland Borough Police
1 April 1967	Gwent Constabulary	Newport Borough Police, Monmouthshire Constabulary
1 April 1967	Hampshire Constabulary	Hampshire and Isle of Wight Constabulary, Portsmouth City Police, Southampton City Police
1 April 1967	Leicester and Rutland Constabulary	Leicestershire and Rutland Constabulary, Leicester City Police
1 April 1967	Lincolnshire Constabulary	Lincolnshire, Grimsby Borough Police, Lincoln City Police
1 April 1967	Liverpool and Bootle Constabulary	Liverpool City Police, Bootle Borough Police
1 April 1967	Suffolk Constabulary	East Suffolk Constabulary, West Suffolk Constabulary, Ipswich Borough Police
1 June 1967	South Wales Constabulary	Glamorgan Constabulary, Cardiff City Police, Merthyr Tydfil Borough Police, Swansea Borough Police
1 June 1967	Sheffield and Rotherham Constabulary	Sheffield City Police, Rotherham Borough Police
1 July 1967	Cheshire Constabulary	Cheshire, Birkenhead Borough Police, Stockport Borough Police, Wallasey Borough Police
1 October 1967	Dorset and Bournemouth Constabulary	Dorset Constabulary, Bournemouth Borough Police
1 October 1967	Gwynedd Constabulary	Gwynedd Constabulary, Denbighshire Constabulary, Flintshire Constabulary
1 October 1967	West Mercia Constabulary	Herefordshire Constabulary, Shropshire Constabulary, Worcestershire Constabulary, Worcester City Police
1 January 1968	Norfolk Joint Police	Norfolk Constabulary, Great Yarmouth Borough Police, Norwich City Police
1 January 1968	Staffordshire and Stoke-on-Trent Constabulary	Staffordshire Constabulary, Stoke-on-Trent City Police
1 January 1968	Sussex Constabulary	East Sussex Constabulary, West Sussex Constabulary, Brighton Borough Police, Eastbourne Borough Police, Hastings Borough Police
1 April 1968	Dyfed-Powys Constabulary	Carmarthenshire and Cardiganshire Constabulary, Mid Wales Constabulary, Pembrokeshire Constabulary
1 April 1968	Nottinghamshire Combined Constabulary	Nottinghamshire Constabulary, Nottingham City Police
1 April 1968	Teesside Constabulary‡	Middlesbrough Borough Police, parts of the areas of North Riding Constabulary and Durham County Constabulary
1 April 1968	Thames Valley Constabulary	Berkshire Constabulary, Buckinghamshire Constabulary, Oxfordshire Constabulary, Oxford City Police, Reading Borough Police
1 June 1968	Manchester and Salford Police	Manchester City Police, Salford City Police
1 July 1968	York and North East Yorkshire Police	East Riding of Yorkshire Constabulary, North Riding of Yorkshire Constabulary, York City Police
1 October 1968	Durham County Constabulary	Durham County, Gateshead Borough Police, South Shields Borough Police
1 October 1968	West Yorkshire Constabulary	West Riding Constabulary, Barnsley Borough Police, Dewsbury Borough Police, Doncaster Borough Police, Halifax Borough Police, Huddersfield Borough Police, Wakefield City Police.
1 April 1969	Essex and Southend-on-Sea Joint Constabulary	Essex Constabulary, Southend-on-Sea Borough Police
1 April 1969	Lancashire Constabulary	Lancashire, Barrow-in-Furness Borough Police, Blackburn Borough Police, Blackpool Borough Police, Bolton Borough Police, Burnley Borough Police, Bury Borough Police, Oldham Borough Police, Preston Borough Police, Rochdale Borough Police, St Helens Borough Police, Southport Borough Police, Warrington Borough Police, Wigan Borough Police
1 April 1969	Northumberland Constabulary	Northumberland Constabulary, Newcastle upon Tyne Borough Police, Tynemouth Borough Police
1969	Warwickshire and Coventry Constabulary	Warwickshire Constabulary, Coventry City Police

‡ New county borough

=== Police areas unaffected by amalgamations ===
The following territorial police forces were not subject to amalgamations under the 1964 Act:

- In Greater London: The Metropolitan Police, City of London Police
- County constabularies: Hertfordshire, Surrey, Wiltshire
- Combined constabularies: Gloucestershire, Kent
- Borough/City forces: Birmingham, Bradford, Bristol, Kingston-upon-Hull, Leeds

== Subsequent developments ==
Several of the amalgamated forces formed under the 1964 act had short existences, as a wholesale reorganisation of local government in England and Wales outside London was carried out in 1974 under the Local Government Act 1972. Police areas were realigned to correspond to one or more of the non-metropolitan or metropolitan counties created by the 1972 legislation. The sections on the composition of police authorities were repealed by the Police and Magistrates' Courts Act 1994, and new authorities constituted.

The whole act, except sections 37 and 60 to 65, schedule 5 and the provisions of schedule 9 other than the entry relating to the Children and Young Persons Act 1933), was repealed by section 103(3) of, and part I of schedule 9 to, the Police Act 1996, which came into force on 22 August 1996.

Section 64(3) of, and schedule 10 to, the act, together with parts of schedule 9, were repealed by section 1 of, and part XI of the schedule to, the Statute Law (Repeals) Act 1974, which came into force on 27 June 1974.

Sections 37, 60–62, 64 (except subsection 2), 65(2)–(4) of, and schedule 5 to, the act were repealed by section 103(3) of, and part II of schedule 9 to, the Police Act 1996, which came into force on 22 August 1996.
