= George Harry Wyatt =

George Henry Wyatt
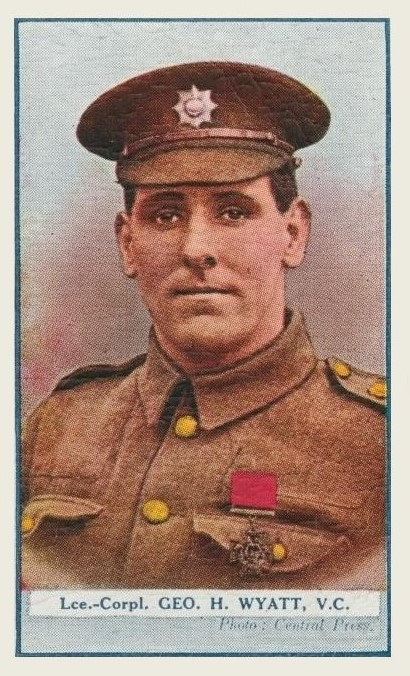
- Wyatt depicted on a cigarette card
- Born: 5 September 1886; Worcester, Worcestershire
- Died: 22 January 1964 (aged 77); Sprotborough, West Riding of Yorkshire
- Burial place: Cadeby Churchyard
- Military career
- Allegiance: United Kingdom
- Branch: British Army
- Service years: 1904–1909, 1914–1919
- Rank: Lance-Sergeant
- Units: Coldstream Guards
- Conflicts: First World War
- Awards: Victoria Cross; Mentioned in dispatches Cross of St. George (Russia)
- Other work: Police officer

George Henry Wyatt (usually known as George Harry Wyatt) VC (5 September 1886 – 22 January 1964) was an English recipient of the Victoria Cross, the highest and most prestigious award for gallantry in the face of the enemy that can be awarded to British and Commonwealth forces.

== Early life ==
George Henry Wyatt was born on 5 September 1886 at Worcester, and enlisted into the Coldstream Guards, British Army on 23 November 1904 at Birmingham. He served with the 2nd Battalion of his regiment at home, and then with the 3rd Battalion, then serving in Egypt.

Transferring to the Reserves on 9 January 1909, he joined the Barnsley Borough Police. Wyatt was recalled to the Army at the outbreak of the First World War on 5 August 1914.

== First World War ==
Wyatt was a 27 years old Lance-Corporal in the 3rd Battalion, the Coldstream Guards, stationed around Landrecies on the night of the 25/26 August, when the following action took place for which he was awarded his VC:

On 25/26 August 1914 at Landrecies, France, part of Lance-Corporal Wyatt's battalion was hotly engaged close to some farm buildings, when the enemy set alight some straw sacks in the farmyard. The lance-corporal twice dashed out under very heavy fire from the enemy, only 25 yards (23 m) away, and extinguished the burning straw, making it possible to hold the position. Later, although wounded in the head, he continued firing until he could no longer see owing to the blood pouring down his face. The medical officer bound up his wound and ordered him to the rear, but he returned to the firing line and went on fighting.

He was wounded again in February 1915 at Cuinchy and evacuated back to England, where he served the rest of the war, transferring to the 5th Battalion in August 1915. He was promoted to Lance-Sergeant on 28 February 1917 and was demobilised on 14 January 1919.

== Later life ==
He returned to the police and served in the Doncaster Borough Police force until his retirement in 1934. He is buried at St John the Evangelist's Church, Cadeby, near Doncaster, South Yorkshire.

== Awards ==
- Victoria Cross
- 1914 Star and bar
- British War Medal
- Victory Medal (with mentioned in dispatches oak leaf spray)
- 1937 Coronation Medal
- 1953 Coronation Medal
- Cross of St. George (3rd class), Russia

== Bibliography ==
- Gliddon, Gerald (2011) [1994]. 1914. VCs of the First World War. The History Press. ISBN 978-0752459080.
