= Denbighshire Constabulary =

Police force in Wales (1840–1967)

Agency overview
- Formed: 1840
- Dissolved: 1 October 1967

Jurisdictional structure
- Operations jurisdiction: Denbighshire, Wales, United Kingdom
- General nature: Civilian police

Operational structure
- Police officers: 320 (1965)

Denbighshire Constabulary was the Home Office police force for the county of Denbighshire, Wales from 1840 until 1967.

== History ==
The Constabulary was formed in 1840, under the County Police Act 1839, to replace the existing parish constables responsible for enforcing the law in local areas. It consisted of divisions or districts including Wrexham “A”, Wrexham “B”, Llanrwst, and Ruthin and Yale. In 1850, the post of Chief Constable was abolished, and the county was divided into two Divisions with a Superintendent for both, with G. M. King at Wrexham and J. Bradshaw at Denbigh. Under the County and Borough Police Act 1856, the position of Chief Constable was reinstated. In 1921, the force gained their first Motor Car.

In 1965, the force had an establishment of 320 and an actual strength of 302. Under the Police Act 1964, it amalgamated with Gwynedd Constabulary and Flintshire Constabulary to form a new Gwynedd Constabulary in 1967, which was renamed North Wales Police in 1974. The Constabulary's archives are held at Denbighshire Archives.

== Chief Constables ==
- 1840–50 John Denman
- 1850–56 G. M. King (Superintendent, Wrexham)
- 1850–56 J. Bradshaw (Superintendent, Denbigh)
- 1856–77 John Denman
- 1877–78 Capt. Augustus W. Price
- 1878–1911 Maj. T.J. Leadbetter
- 1964–67 Walter Stansfield

== See also ==
- North Wales Police
