= Special Constables Act 1914 =

Act of the Parliament of the United Kingdom

Special Constables Act 1914 (Note: Section 2.)
- Act of Parliament
- Parliament of the United Kingdom
- Long title: An Act to enable His Majesty, by Order in Council, to make regulations with respect to Special Constables appointed during the present war.
- Citation: 4 & 5 Geo. 5. c. 61
- Territorial extent: United Kingdom

Dates
- Royal assent: 28 August 1914
- Commencement: 28 August 1914 (Note: The Acts of Parliament (Commencement) Act 1793.)
- Repealed: Scotland: 1 January 1957; England and Wales: 1 April 1965 (Note: The Police Act 1964 (Commencement No. 1) Order 1964 (SI 1964/873).); Northern Ireland:
Other legislation
Amended by	Special Constables Act 1923
Repealed by	Scotland: Police (Scotland) Act 1956; England and Wales: Police Act 1964; Northern Ireland: Police Act (Northern Ireland) 1970

Status: Repealed

Text of statute as originally enacted

The Special Constables Act 1914 (4 & 5 Geo. 5. c. 61) was an act of the Parliament of the United Kingdom, with the long title An Act to enable His Majesty, by Order in Council, to make regulations with respect to Special Constables appointed during the present war. It was given royal assent on 28 August 1914, weeks after the outbreak of the First World War. It enabled the monarch to make regulations by Orders in Council regarding special constables for the duration of that conflict under the Special Constables Act 1831 (1 & 2 Will. 4. c. 41) or a section of the Municipal Corporations Act 1882 (45 & 46 Vict. c. 50) or under similar legislation in Scotland and Ireland.

The act waived the 1831 act's requirement for a "tumult, riot, or felony" to have occurred or be imminent before special constables could be appointed, made any regulation made by those Orders in Council binding on those appointed as special constables and extended to special constables the gratuities and allowances for constables injured in the line of duty or dependents of constables killed in the line of duty from the Police Acts between 1839 and 1910.

== Subsequent developments ==
The act was later made permanent by the Special Constables Act 1923 (13 & 14 Geo. 5. c. 11).

The whole act was repealed for Scotland by section 38(1) of, and the third schedule to, the Police (Scotland) Act 1956 (4 & 5 Eliz. 2. c. 26), which came into force on 1 January 1957.

The whole act was repealed for England and Wales by section 64(3) of, and part I of schedule 10 to, the Police Act 1964, which came into force on 1 August 1964.
