= Walter Stansfield =

British police officer and Chief Constable of Derbyshire (1917–84)

Lieutenant Colonel Sir Walter Stansfield Kt CBE CStJ MC QPM CPM

Chief Constable of Derbyshire Constabulary
- In office 1967–1979
- Preceded by: William Ewart Pitts
- Succeeded by: James Fryer

Chief Constable of Denbighshire Constabulary
- In office 1964–1967
- Succeeded by: Abolished (amalgamation with Gwynedd Constabulary)

Personal details
- Born: 15 February 1917 Brighouse, England
- Died: 14 December 1984 (aged 67)
- Military career
- Allegiance: United Kingdom
- Branch: British Army
- Service years: 1942–1946
- Rank: Lieutenant Colonel
- Units: Royal Artillery; Special Operations Executive

Sir Walter Stansfield (15 February 1917 – 14 December 1984) was a British police officer and soldier who was Chief Constable of Denbighshire Constabulary (1964–67) and Derbyshire Constabulary (1967–79).

== Career ==
Stansfield was born in Brighouse, Yorkshire, on 15 February 1917, the son of F. and A. G. Stansfield. He was educated at Chartres, France, and at the Heath Grammar School, Halifax, Yorkshire, before joining the West Riding Constabulary in 1939. Three years later, he joined the Royal Artillery and a year later joined the Special Operations Executive (SOE).

He parachuted into France (near Severac, Aveyron), in June 1944 in order to organise maquis groups and direct sabotage and attacks on the retreating Germans. He was Lieutenant Colonel during the Control Commission in Germany during 1945–46 and was seconded to the Special Police Corps in Germany from 1946 until 1950.

Stansfield served in the West Riding Constabulary (1950–56) before being seconded to the Cyprus Police Force from 1956 to 1959. He returned to the West Riding Constabulary in 1959 and was Assistant Chief Constable from 1962 to 1964. He was appointed Chief Constable of Denbighshire Constabulary in 1964, and then became Chief Constable of Derbyshire Constabulary in 1967.

In 1981, he was the Joint Editor (with James Fryer) of the 24th edition of Cecil C. H. Moriarty's handbook of police law, Moriarty' s Police Law: An Arrangement of Law and Regulations for the Use of Police Officers. Stansfield died on 14 December 1984.

== Honours ==
Stansfield was awarded the Military Cross (MC) in 1945 and was also the recipient of the French Croix de Guerre (with Palm) in 1947. He received the Colonial Police Medal (CPM) in 1959 and the Queen's Police Medal (QPM) in 1969. He was appointed a Commander of the Order of the British Empire (CBE) in the 1974 New Year Honours. Stansfield became a Knight Bachelor in the 1979 New Year Honours and was appointed a Commander of the Order of St John of Jerusalem (CStJ) later the same year.

== Publications ==
- Fryer, James; Stansfield, Walter, eds. (1981). Moriarty's Police Law: An Arrangement of Law and Regulations for the Use of Police Officers (24th ed.). London: Butterworths.
