= Parish constable =

Medieval English law enforcement officer

A parish constable, also known as a petty constable, was a law enforcement officer, usually unpaid and part-time, serving a parish. The position evolved from the ancient chief pledge of a tithing and takes its name from the office of constable with which it was originally unconnected.

It is distinct from the more senior position of the hundred-constable, also known as the high constable (e.g. the High Constable of Holborn, who was one of the hundred-constables for Ossulstone; Ossulstone's hundred court was located at Red Lion Square, in Holborn).

In London (excluding the City of London), the position was superseded by the introduction of the Metropolitan Police Service in 1829, which created a full-time professional force. Elsewhere, professional county police forces took over, after the County Police Act 1839 was passed.

In 1995 the Home Office reintroduced parish constables in the "Parish Constable Scheme" (NCJ number 157623). The Parish Constable Scheme was announced in 1993 by the Home Secretary to establish foot patrols in rural areas. The job fell to the special constabulary who were asked to provide (if special constables were willing), officers who would be trained in the work and operate solely in their own parishes.

== History of position ==
=== Origin ===
The office of parish constable originated from the tithing, a small unit of local administration. Each tithing was obliged, by frankpledge, to be responsible for the actions of its members. The heads of each household would often select one of their number to take charge of the tithing – an appointment usually known as "chief pledge", except in Kent, Sussex, and parts of Surrey, where the position was called "headborough".

View of frankpledge, a judicial process, obliged each tithing to attend the shire court at regular intervals, and hand over any person in their tithing who the court had summoned; if they did not, and could not swear on oath that they were not involved in helping that person evade justice, the remaining people in the tithing had to pay the damages incurred by the actions of that person. Since this created an incentive for each tithing to enforce standards of behaviour among its own members, the chief pledge of each tithing was effectively obliged to police behaviour in the tithing.

=== The emergence of constables ===
The term constable was originally unconnected with the chief pledge, and referred to officers in charge of the cavalry; it originates from the Latin comes stabuli, meaning count of the stable. By extension, constable referred to the officer in command of the army – one of the Great Officers of State. In times of relative peace, this officer was sometimes given a role in keeping order, on account of his command of military resources. Additional constables were sometimes appointed, if order needed to be kept in multiple places, or the main constable was busy in his main role.

The term constable consequently began to have a more general meaning related to enforcing order; in 1285 King Edward I of England "constituted two constables in every hundred to prevent defaults in towns and highways". In England and Scotland, the officer in command of the army then came to be called the Lord High Constable, to avoid ambiguity over his role. As the chief pledge were also involved in policing people's behaviour, though at a much smaller scale, and with much-lowered resources, they gradually came to be referred to as petty constables.

Tithings were originally connected with the hundred, but the courts baron introduced by the feudal system, attracted more attention, and the significance of the hundreds decreased. To shift the balance of power away from feudal lords again, magistrates were introduced, and the kings gradually transferred various functions to them, including from the shire courts. In 1381, magistrates acquired responsibility for the remains of view of frankpledge, thereby gaining oversight of the activity of petty constables.

The feudal system had gradually been weakened over the Middle Ages, and by the time of the Reformation, the focus of local administration had shifted away from manors and towards civil parishes. Tithings consequently came to be seen as a division of the parish, and so petty constables became seen as parish constables; there are records of parish constables by the 17th century in the county records of Buckinghamshire.

=== Functions ===
Parish Constables Act 1842 (Note: The citation of this act by this short title was authorised by section 1 of, and the first schedule to, the Short Titles Act 1896. Due to the repeal of those provisions it is now authorised by section 19(2) of the Interpretation Act 1978.)
- Act of Parliament
- Parliament of the United Kingdom
- Long title: An Act for the Appointment and Payment of Parish Constables.
- Citation: 5 & 6 Vict. c. 109
- Territorial extent: United Kingdom

Dates
- Royal assent: 12 August 1842
- Commencement: 12 August 1842 (Note: The Acts of Parliament (Commencement) Act 1793.)
- Repealed: 1 April 1965 (Note: The Police Act 1964 (Commencement No. 1) Order 1964.)
Other legislation
Amended by	Local Government Act 1933
Repealed by	Police Act 1964

Status: Repealed

Text of statute as originally enacted

Parish constables derived most of their powers from their local parish. Traditionally, they were elected by the parishioners (just as the tithing had chosen their chief pledge forebears), but from 1622 onwards could appointed by the magistrates if the court leet failed to appoint them. It was, however, only in 1842 that the power to appoint constables was formally stripped from manorial courts, and transferred to justices of the peace on the recommendation of the parish overseers of the poor by the Parish Constables Act 1842 (5 & 6 Vict. c. 109). In 1928, the power was transferred again, from the overseers to parish councils.

Like many official positions at the time, the position was obligatory, and unpaid, although the chosen constable had the right to employ someone to perform the role on their behalf. It was often a resented burden, as it involved a wide variety of extremely time consuming tasks.

In accordance with the ancient obligation for tithings to present indicted individuals to the courts, each civil parish typically had a small location in which the constable could confine criminals. The constable was responsible not only for confining such people, but also for delivering them to the courts. Similarly, constables were also expected to try to prevent crime within their parish; they were among the people with authority to read the Riot Act, and were expected to do so if a riotous assembly arose in their parish.

Vagabonds and beggars could be a drain on parish resources, under the Elizabethan Poor Law. They could also be a potential source of crime. Constables were expected to implement the Vagabonds and Beggars Act 1494 (11 Hen. 7. c. 2), under which vagabonds and beggars were to be set in the stocks for three days, and then whipped until they leave the parish. The constable also had general responsibility for the local stocks, as well as for the pillory, and was expected to punish poachers, drunks, hedge-damagers, prostitutes, church-avoiders, and fathers of bastards.

Just as the tithing was a general administrative unit, and not exclusively limited to policing matters, so the parish constable had functions that would not be recognised as police matters, unlike hundred-constables (which had derived from the military constable).

Parish constables were expected to monitor trading standards and pubs, catch rats, restrain loose animals, light signal beacons, provide local lodging and transport for the military, perform building control, attend inquests, and collect the parish rates. They were also responsible for collecting national taxes, within their area.

Parish constables in 1995 were recruited from the special constabulary. Their primary function was foot patrols in their own neighbourhoods, whilst some were given greater range. Their work on the ground included all manner of police work. The parish constable in the Scotch Corner area of Richmond, North Yorkshire, patrolled seven villages and hamlets by using both private and police vehicles as and when available.

=== Professionalisation ===
The historian Stephen Inwood describes the 4,000 parish constables existing in the early 19th century as "of variable quality and commitment"; some London parishes, such as Kensington, Fulham and Deptford (with over 55,000 inhabitants between them at the time of the 1821 census) had no policing at all, and the quality of policing was generally considered inadequate by this period.

The Metropolitan Police Act 1829 (10 Geo. 4. c. 44) and County Police Act 1839 (2 & 3 Vict. c. 93) gradually led to the end of most unprofessional constabulary. The Metropolitan Police Act 1829 established a professional and trained police force, in place of the parish constables, within the bounds of London; the County Police Act 1839 allowed counties to do likewise. Each new force was to be headed by a chief constable (replacing the hundred-constables) who would be appointed by the county magistrates. The wide administrative functions of parish constables were taken over by various recently established local boards (which eventually were re-organised to become local councils).

The voluntary nature of the County Police Act 1839 meant that the change proceeded in a piecemeal fashion. The first county to establish a professional force was Wiltshire, which appointed its first chief constable on 28 November 1839; Essex followed a few months later, appointing its first chief constable on 11 February 1840.

The City of London had been exempted from the Metropolitan Police Act 1829, and used a local act of Parliament, the City of London Police Act 1839 (2 & 3 Vict. c. xciv), to establish its own professional force as the City of London Police.

Parish Constables Act 1872 (Note: Section 15.)
- Act of Parliament
- Parliament of the United Kingdom
- Long title: An Act to render unnecessary the general Appointment of Parish Constables.
- Citation: 35 & 36 Vict. c. 92

Dates
- Royal assent: 10 August 1872
- Commencement: 24 March 1873 (Note: Section 1.)
- Repealed: 1 August 1965 (Note: The Police Act 1964 (Commencement No. 1) Order 1964 (SI 1964/873).)
Other legislation
Amends	Poor Relief Act 1662; Distress for Rent Act 1689; Payment of Charges of Constables Act 1778
Repealed by	Police Act 1964

Status: Repealed

Text of statute as originally enacted

Following the Parish Constables Act 1872 (35 & 36 Vict. c. 92), parish constables were no longer required to be appointed for every parish, and could only be appointed if the court of quarter sessions determined that it was necessary to do so, and put parish constables under the authority of the chief constable of the area.

The Police Act 1964 abolished the office of parish constable in England and Wales. In Guernsey and Jersey, parish constables still exist as elected parish officers called connétables.
