= Wakefield City Police =

Defunct police force

Wakefield City Police was the police force for the city of Wakefield in the West Riding of Yorkshire, England between the years of 1888 and 1968. Previously, from 1848 to 1888, the force was known as Wakefield Borough Police.

== Origins ==
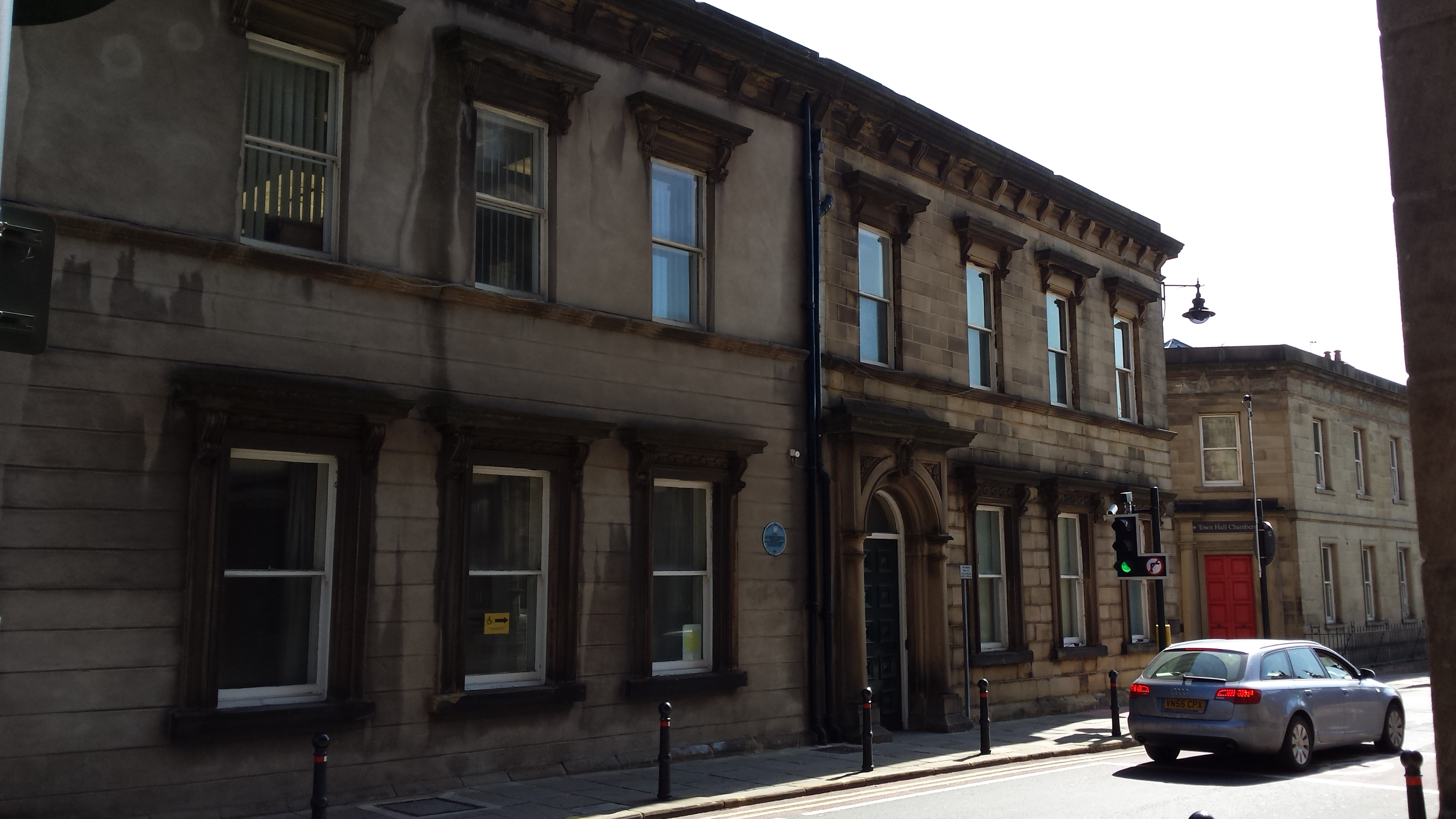
The former Wakefield City Police Station in Cliff Parade, Wakefield – now part of the Wakefield & Pontefract Magistrates' Court.

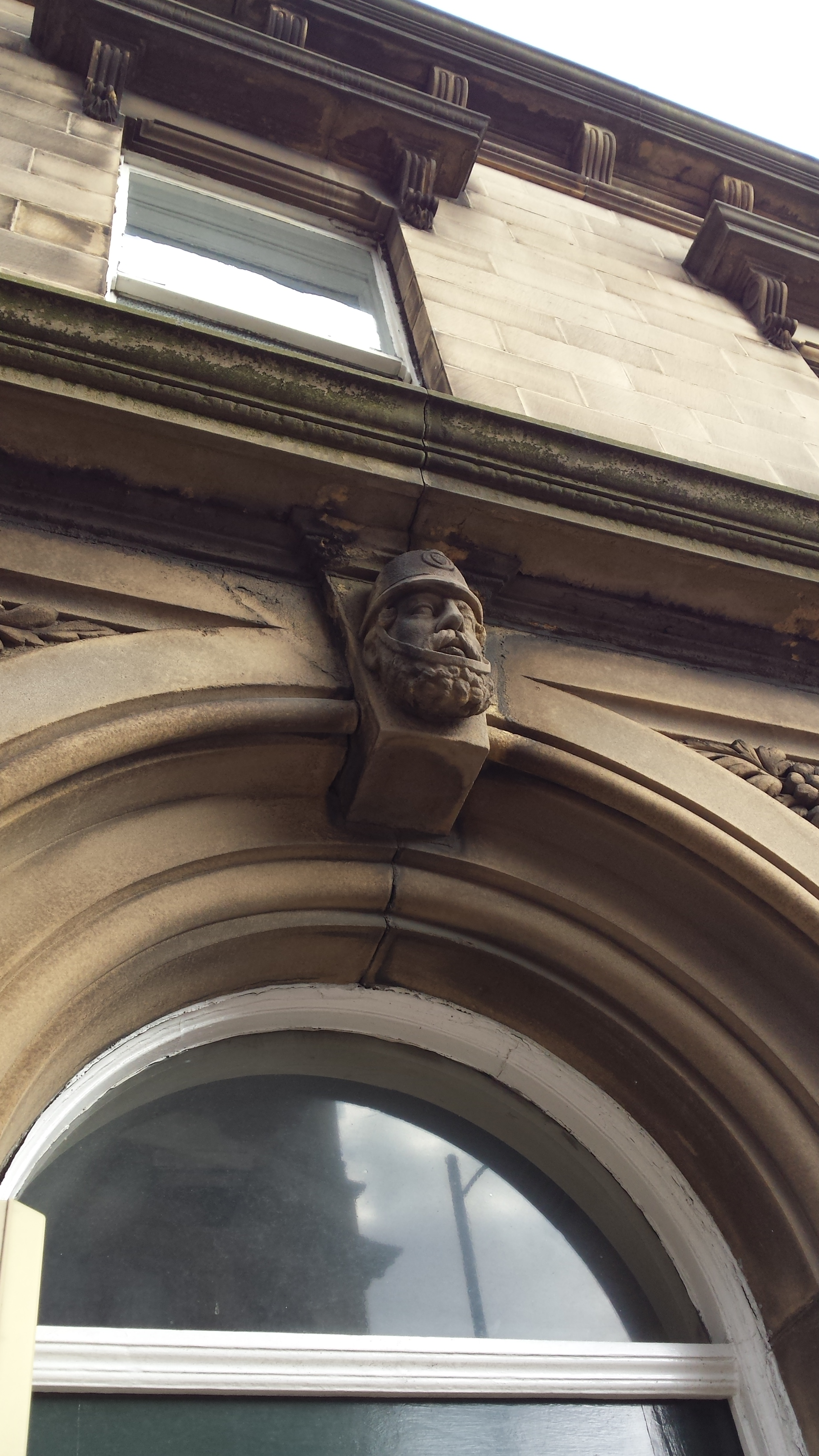
The stone carved policeman's head above the door facing onto Cliff Parade.

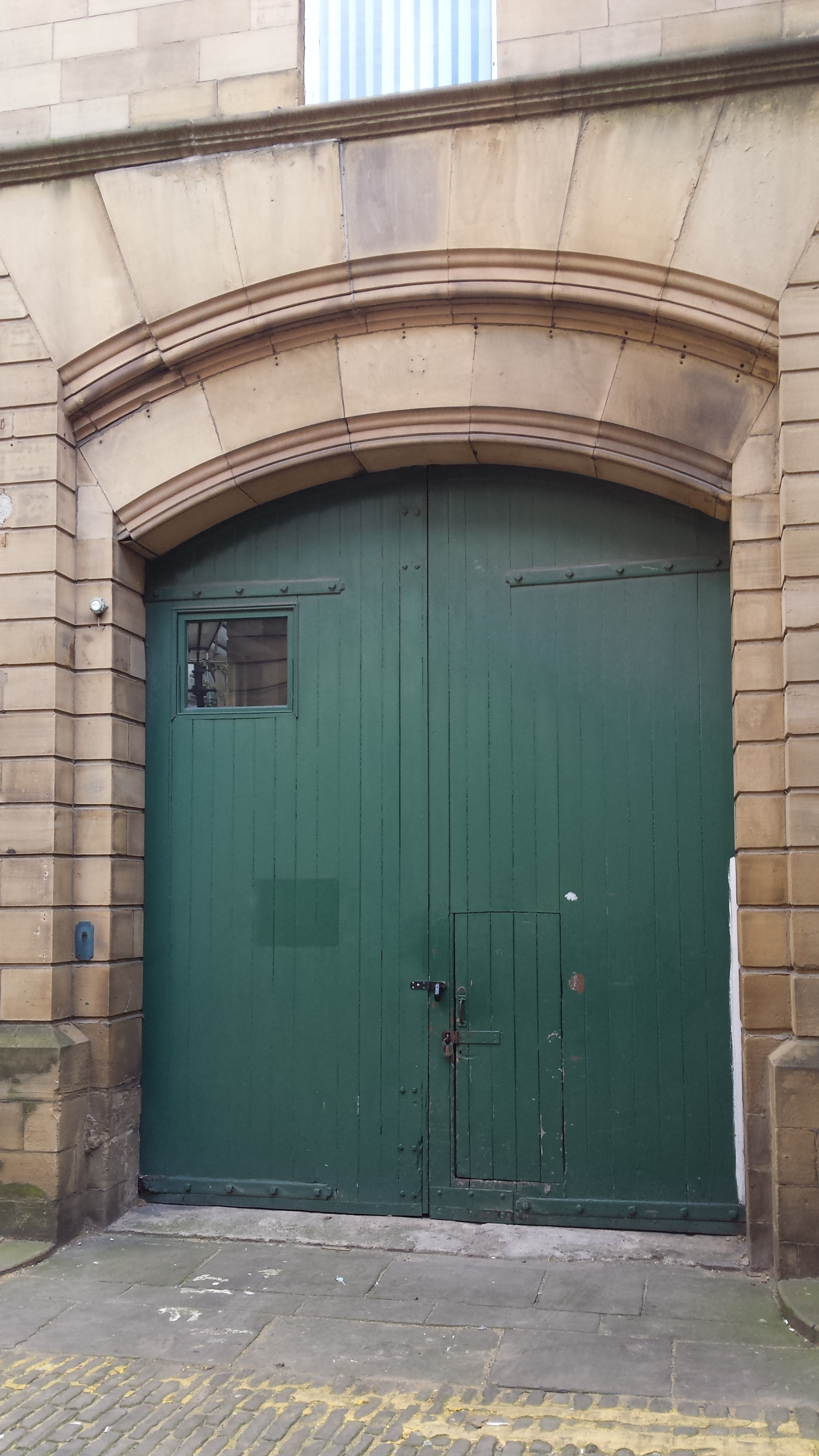
Archway found to the rear of the former Wakefield City Police Station.

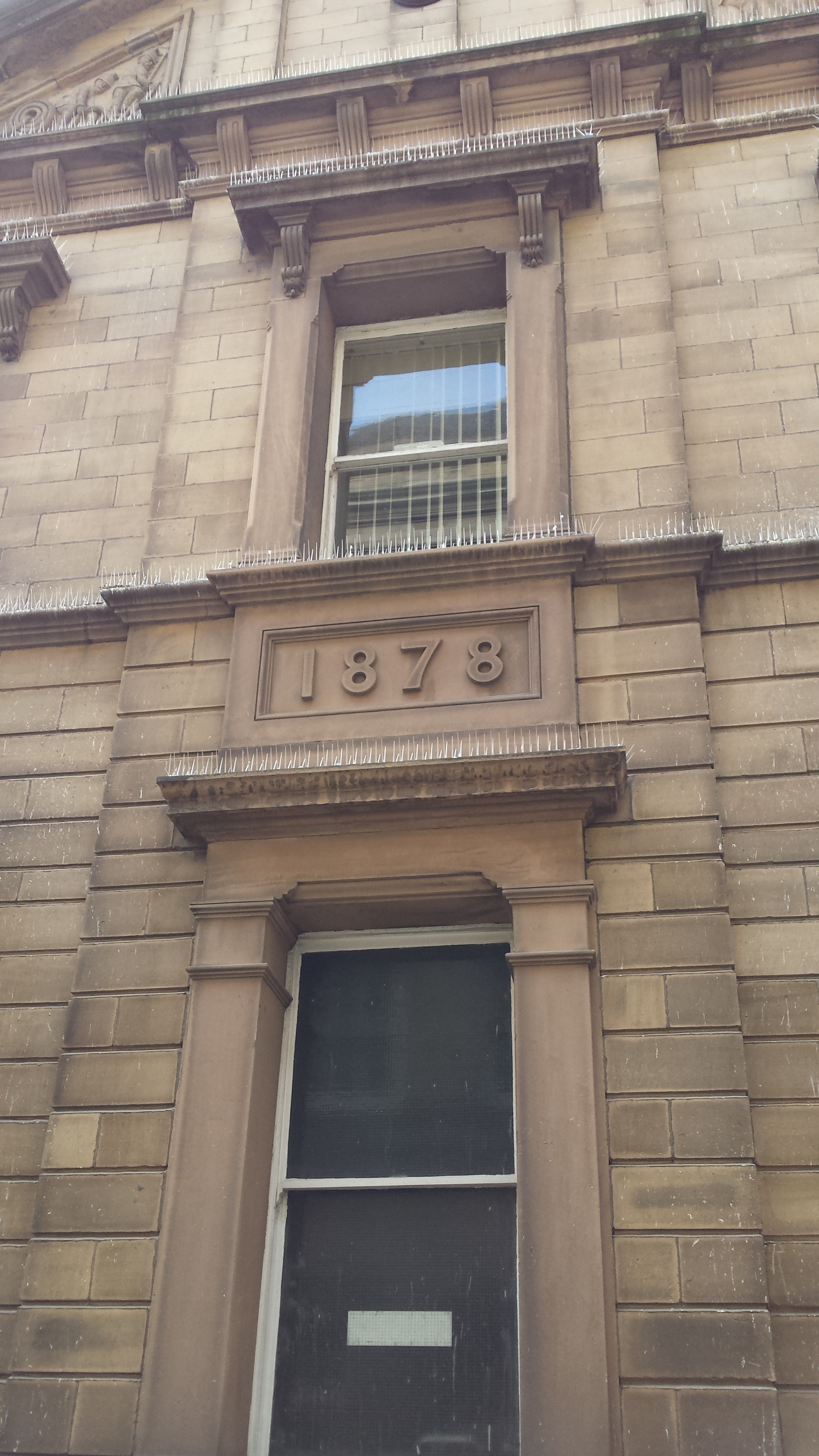
Rear of the former Wakefield City Police Station.

The Wakefield Borough Police came into being in September 1848 after the Borough Council were tasked with forming a 'constabulary force' for the newly formed borough. The first police station was located in King Street and still stands today – the building immediately to the south was a Fire Engine House – the building originally being the 'Police and Vagrant Office' in 1829. The building consisted of two cells and a short time afterwards, a female detention was built on the first floor. In 1876 the police station moved to half of a renovated building known as the 'Tammy Hall', which had been constructed in 1778 and when the southern half had been demolished to make way for the Town Hall, the northernmost part of the building was refurbished to form a new police and fire station. New buildings were added to the refurbished Tammy Hall, to the north (Chief Constable's Office and Charge Office); the west on King Street (Chief Constable's house) and the south (Fire Station). The ground floor housed 20 cells with an underground passage linking the cells in the police station to the cells below the Court Room in the Town Hall. This building is now the Wakefield and Pontefract Magistrates' Court.

In 1888, the City of Wakefield was formed after letters patent were issued and on 25 June the police was officially known as the Wakefield City Police and would keep this name until the force was disbanded in 1968.

The city boundaries increased in size and with this, Wakefield City Police absorbed 279 acres from the West Riding Constabulary when the Wakefield City Extension Act came into force – this included the area of Thornes, the site on which Pinderfields Hospital now stands, and parts of Lupset and Flanshaw. The parish of Alverthorpe was added in 1900 and in 1909 the parish of Sandal was included in the jurisdiction of Wakefield City Police – with officers stationed at Belle Vue, Sandal Common (now known as Agbrigg), Haddingley Hill, Sandal Magna, Milnthorpe and Newmillerdam. Two new houses on Agbrigg Road were occupied by police officers from Wakefield City, these houses being near Sandal Fire Station (no longer standing) in May 1910. The largest and latest addition to the force area came in April 1951 when the parish of Crigglestone and what would become the Kettlethorpe estate was added to the Milnthorpe beat.

== Beat system ==
With the introduction of the police boxes, the City was divided into eight 'Day Beats', operated between 0600hrs and 1800hrs – three foot-based city centre beats known as 'Office', 'Westgate' and 'Kirgate; and five 'outer' beats were patrolled on bicycle. Each 'Day Beat' was further divided into two 'Night Beats', worked between 1800hrs and 0600hrs, with one officer on foot, the other on bicycle (one 'Day Beat' was divided into three 'Night Beats'). The beat system was updated with the 'Unit Beat System' which came into operation on 20 May 1968 – with the City divided into five units, in turn made up of ten beats – with three city centre beats being patrolled on foot as had been under the old 'beat system'. With the introduction of the unit beat system, officers would patrol in vehicles (known as 'panda' cars) who would assist with calls when the resident beat officer was off duty.

=== Police Boxes ===
The Police Telephone Box system, which had been championed by the Newcastle City and Edinburgh City forces was introduced in 1929 and Wakefield City installed 19 boxes with an extra being installed at Sandal Police Station, Agbrigg Road. This system allowed for constables on the beat to attend at a police box and communicate with headquarters and the boxes were also for the use of the public to summon assistance. All calls from the police boxes were routed to the Charge Office at headquarters. A further 5 boxes were added in 1935 and this method of operation was maintained up to the 1960s. Below is a list of the locations of the police boxes in the 1950s:

Number	Location
1	Leeds Road / Andrew Street
2	Police Station (Cliff Parade)
3	Westmorland Street / Springs
4	Stanley Road / Greenwood Road
5	Westgate Top
6	Westgate / Ings Road
7	Batley Road / Flanshaw
8	Horbury Road / Lupset Bar
9	Caldervale Road / Kirkgate
10	Kirkgate / Volunteer Yard
11	Denby Dale Road / Thornes Park
12	Doncaster Road / Elm Tree Street
13	Barnsley Road / Busy Corner
14	Barnsley Road / Woodthorpe Lane
15	Barnsley Road / Slack Lane
16	Barnsley Road / St. Helen's Church
17	Agbrigg Road / Newlands Street
18	Horbury Road / Cross Lane
19	George-a-Green Road / Dewsbury Road
20	Eastmoor Road / Pinderfields Road
21	Baln Lane / Silcoates Street
22	Portobello Road / Pugneys Road
23	Townley Road / Robin Hood Crescent
24	Broadway / Waterton Road
25	Queen Elizabeth Road / Windhill Road
26	Park Lodge Lane / Park Hill Lane

== Vehicles ==
The Traffic Department was set up in 1945 and in 1952 two patrol cars were the first to be installed with VHF radio. Officers were sent to the West Riding Constabulary's Driving School at Crofton from the mid-1950s for driving training – this building was still used for the purpose until 2014 by Wakefield City and West Riding Constabulary's successors; West Yorkshire Constabulary and then West Yorkshire Police. The building is now vacant.

Two Lambretta scooters were purchased in July 1958, each installed with VHF radio and in 1965, the scooters were replaced with motor-cycles.

== Communications ==
West Riding Constabulary operated the VHF system after the Second World War on behalf of its own force, West Riding Fire Brigade and the police forces of Barnsley, Dewsbury, Doncaster and Wakefield. West Riding Constabulary was linked by telephone to the Home Office Regional Wireless Station at Kippax which broadcast medium wave radio transmissions, before being replaced by VHF. Wakefield City Police's force call-sign was M2XU – the Home Office and Scottish Office allocating police forces and fire brigades with four-character call-signs beginning with 'M2xx'. Originally there was going to be two radio channels, 'A' covering West Riding Constabulary patrol vehicles and the 'B' channel covering ancillary vehicles of West Riding, the fire brigade and the other police forces however this took too long to come to fruition, so Wakefield City withdrew from the agreement. A transmitter-receiver was installed in the Charge Office and a teleprinter was installed in the same office in September 1947 which was linked to the West Riding Constabulary headquarters.

== Statistics ==
In the last full statistical year of the force, 1967; Wakefield City Police dealt with the following according to the Chief Constable's Annual Report of that year:

- 1881 reported crimes, of which 778 were detected.
- £58,064 16s 11d worth of property stolen, of which £13,2303 12s 6d was recovered.
- 1480 non-indictable (non-traffic) offences reported, 1440 were met with a conviction.
- 1444 persons reported for 1922 offences which resulted in 96 drivers being disqualified.
- 1733 Fixed Penalty tickets issued.
- 10 fatalities and 425 injuries in 346 reported accidents, further 790 non-injury accidents reported.
- 1059 emergency 999 calls received and investigated.
- 464 deaths reported resulting in 99 inquests being attended.
- 17 lost children reunited with parents.
- 64 insecure premises were discovered.
- 1519 unoccupied houses were reported and taken care of.

== Amalgamation ==
The introduction of the Police Act 1964, the Home Secretary Roy Jenkins proposed nationwide amalgamations of smaller police forces and Wakefield City was included – the plan involved amalgamating Wakefield City with Bradford City Police, Barnsley, Dewsbury, Doncaster, Halifax and Huddersfield and West Riding Constabulary to create a force of 5000 officers – one of the biggest in the country (although Bradford City Police withdrew from the arrangement and remained a separate force such as its neighbour, Leeds City Police) The new force would be known as West Yorkshire Constabulary. The force area became the Wakefield Division of the new force with all officers working from the former West Riding premises in Wood Street (Wood Street Police Station was closed and replaced in 2014 by a PFI new-build divisional headquarters on Havertop Lane, Normanton) The former police station in the city centre closed its doors at 0900hrs on Tuesday 1 October 1968. The West Yorkshire Constabulary would exist for only six years; in 1974 the bulk of the force was split into the modern day West Yorkshire Police and South Yorkshire Police.
