= Flintshire Constabulary =

Police force in Wales (1856–1967)

Agency overview
- Formed: 1856
- Dissolved: 1 October 1967

Jurisdictional structure
- Operations jurisdiction: Flintshire, Wales, United Kingdom
- General nature: Civilian police

Operational structure
- Police officers: 256 (1965)

Flintshire Constabulary was the Home Office police force for the county of Flintshire, Wales, from 1856 until 1967.

== History ==
the Constabulary was formed in 1856, under the County and Borough Police Act 1856, to replace the existing parish constables responsible for enforcing the law in local areas. The Constabulary included divisions or districts, including Holywell, Mold, Overton and Rhyl.

In 1965, the force had an establishment of 256 and an actual strength of 231. The force amalgamated with Denbighshire Constabulary and Gwynedd Constabulary in 1967, under the Police Act 1964, to form a new Gwynedd Constabulary, which was renamed North Wales Police in 1974. The Constabulary's archives are held at North East Wales Archives, Hawarden.

== Chief Constables ==
- 1857–88 Peter Browne
- 1888–1909 Maj. R.T. Webber
- c.1927–37 Robert Yarnell-Davies, MBE
- 1942–47 Albert Edwin Lindsay
- c.1951–66 John Fenlli Roberts, MBE
- c.1966–67 Reginald Atkins

== See also ==
- North Wales Police
