= Manchester and Salford Police =

Agency overview
- Formed: 1 April 1968; 58 years ago
- Dissolved: 31 March 1974; 52 years ago
- Superseding agency: Greater Manchester Police
- Legal personality: Police

Jurisdictional structure
- Legal jurisdiction: Manchester and Salford

Operational structure
- Agency executive: William James Richards, Chief Constable

Manchester and Salford Police was a police force in England from 1 April 1968 to 31 March 1974. It was created as a merger of the Manchester City Police and Salford City Police under the Police Act 1964 and covered the adjacent county boroughs of Manchester and Salford.

The force had a strength of 2,446 officers on formation with Salford becoming 'F' Division and the remaining 'A'-'E' divisions of Manchester being unchanged.

The chief constable was W James Richards, previously Chief Constable of Manchester City Police.

Initially the members of the amalgamated force continued to wear their old uniforms. In May 1969 the Manchester and Salford Police Authority was granted armorial bearings. The escutcheon or shield of the coat of arms was blazoned as Per pale wavy gules and azure, a chief also per pale wavy argent and Or, six bees volant, two, two and two, proper, and this appeared in the centre of the force's helmet plates and badges.

In 1974 the short-lived force was amalgamated with parts of the Lancashire Constabulary, Cheshire Constabulary and West Yorkshire Police under the Local Government Act 1972 to form Greater Manchester Police.

== See also ==
- Law enforcement in the United Kingdom
- List of law enforcement agencies in the United Kingdom, Crown Dependencies and British Overseas Territories
- Greater Manchester Fire and Rescue Service
- Life on Mars, a television drama depicting a Manchester police station in 1973
