= Duty armband =

Former British police item of uniform

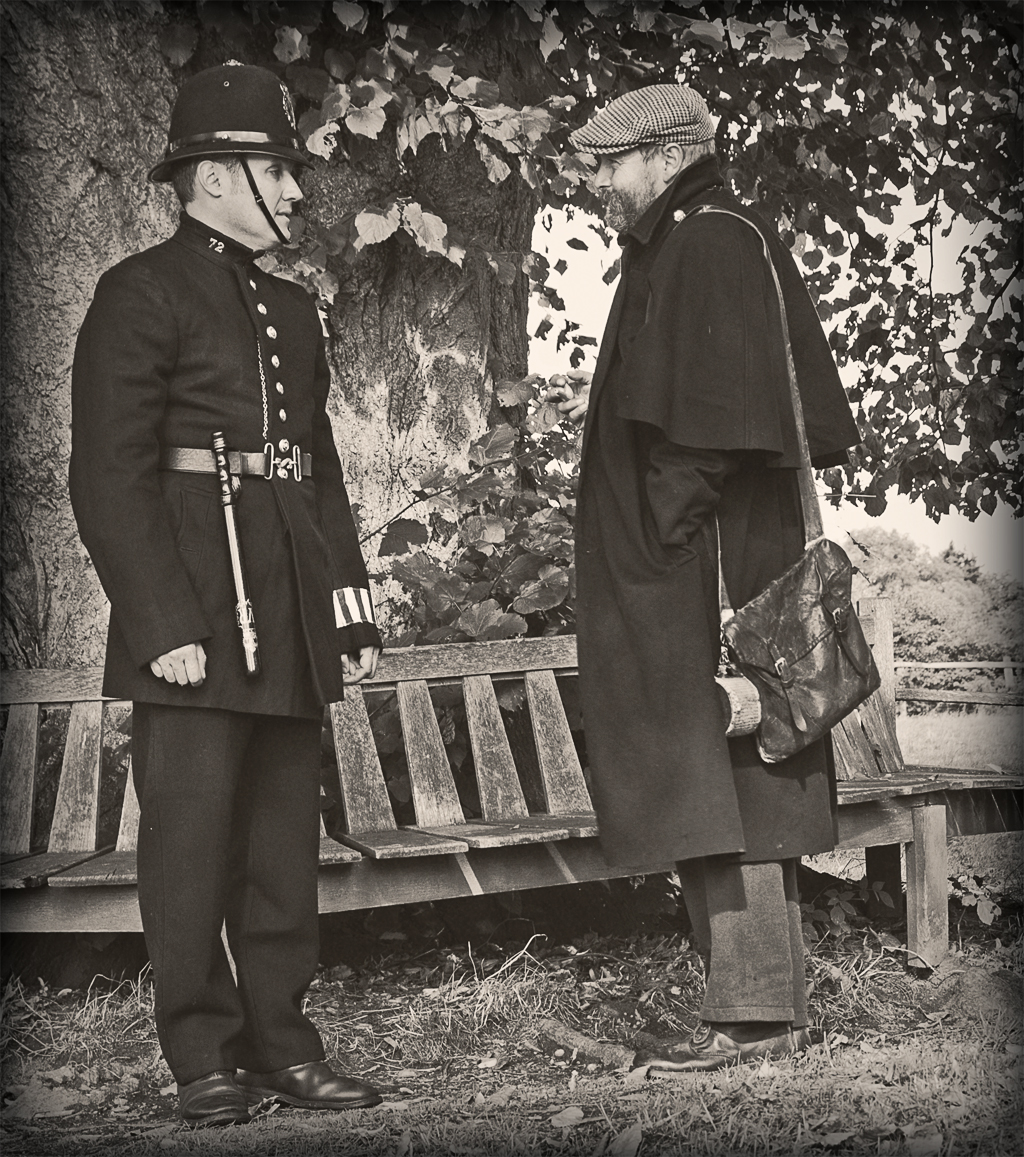
Victorian police officer with itinerant circa 1900 (recreation). The officer is pictured wearing a duty armband on his left wrist.

The duty armband was worn on the uniforms of British police officers from 1830 to 1968.

All uniformed constables and sergeants were required to wear the armband on the left forearm sleeve of the tunic, signifying that the officers were on duty as the practice was introduced when police officers wore their uniforms at all times. The armband consisted of blue and white vertically striped cloth and between 1835 and 1864, Sergeants were required to wear a narrower version on the right forearm as a badge of rank. Constables and sergeants attached to Road Policing Units were exempt from wearing the armlet due to the risk of catching it on an indicator arm.

During the First World War, special constables were widely used by police forces to relieve the regular service. From 1910 to the end of the war, specials were not usually issued with uniforms, but were instead expected to wear an armband just above the elbow of the left arm displaying their identification number and rank. For a short time, special sergeants and inspectors were required to wear a second armband on their right arm to indicate rank.

If an officer was approached whilst off duty by a member of the public attempting to make a complaint about a certain issue, he might tap the vacant wrist to indicate he was not on duty, and therefore not obliged to respond. This gave rise to a term used throughout the remainder of the twentieth century by some officers where if an colleague unfairly declined to take on a given issue, it would be said that he had "cuffed" the matter.

== See also ==
- History of law enforcement in the United Kingdom
- Police uniforms and equipment in the United Kingdom
