= Special Constables Act 1838 =

Act of the Parliament of the United Kingdom

Special Constables Act 1838 (Note: The citation of this act by this short title was authorised by section 1 of, and the first schedule to, the Short Titles Act 1896. Due to the repeal of those provisions it is now authorised by section 19(2) of the Interpretation Act 1978.)
- Act of Parliament
- Parliament of the United Kingdom
- Long title: An Act for the Payment of Constables for Keeping the Peace near Public Works.
- Citation: 1 & 2 Vict. c. 80
- Territorial extent: United Kingdom

Dates
- Royal assent: 10 August 1838
- Commencement: 10 August 1838 (Note: Section 1.)
- Repealed: 1 April 1965
Other legislation
Amended by	Statute Law Revision Act 1874 (No. 2)
Repealed by	Police Act 1964
Relates to	Special Constables Act 1831

Status: Repealed

Text of statute as originally enacted

The Special Constables Act 1838 (1 & 2 Vict. c. 80) was an act of the Parliament of the United Kingdom.

== Preamble ==
Whereas great mischiefs have arisen by the outrageous and unlawful behaviour of labourers and others employed on railroads [sic], canals, and other public works, by reason whereof the appointment of special constables is often necessary for keeping the peace, and for the protection of the inhabitants and security of the property in the neighbourhood of such public works, whereby great expenses have been cast upon the public rates of counties and other districts chargeable with such expenses:-

The act dealt with financial matters connected with the appointment and payment of the aforesaid constables; it provided for the companies employing the labourers and others to bear the cost of the constables and also limited any such claims which were deemed to be unreasonable.

== Subsequent developments ==
Section 4 of the act was repealed by section 1 of, and the schedule to, the Statute Law Revision Act 1874 (No. 2) (37 & 38 Vict. c. 96), which came into force on 9 August 1844.

The whole act was repealed by section 64(3) of, and part I of schedule 10 to, the Police Act 1964, which came into force on 1 April 1965.
