= Salford City Police =

Defunct police force

Salford City Police was the police force responsible for policing the borough (later city) of Salford, near Manchester, England from 1844 through to 1968. Prior to Salford gaining city status in 1926 the force was called Salford Borough Police.

In 1851 the force consisted of 39 police officers at an annual cost of £2,500.

On 1 April 1968, as a result of a compulsory amalgamation scheme under the Police Act 1964, the force was abolished and, along with Manchester City Police, became part of the new Manchester and Salford Police. This new force lasted only 6 years when on 1 April 1974 the Manchester and Salford Police was amalgamated with a number of other police forces and parts of police forces to form the Greater Manchester Police which polices the area to this day.

William James Richards was the only holder of the post of chief constable of Manchester and Salford Police (1968-1974), having previously been the chief constable of Manchester City Police from 1966 to 1968.

== See also ==
- List of defunct law enforcement agencies in the United Kingdom
