= Sheffield and Rotherham Constabulary =

Defunct police force

Sheffield and Rotherham Constabulary was a short-lived police force in England from 1 June 1967 to 31 March 1974. It was created as a merger of the Sheffield City Police and Rotherham Borough Police, and covered the adjacent county boroughs of Sheffield and Rotherham. It was amalgamated under the Local Government Act 1972 with parts of the West Yorkshire Constabulary to form South Yorkshire Police.
