= Burnden Park disaster =

1946 crowd crush in Lancashire, England

Coordinates: 53°34′08″N 2°24′58″W

- Women and children being passed over the heads of others at the Railway End during the crush
- Date: 9 March 1946; 80 years ago
- Location: Bolton, Lancashire, England
- Cause: Overcrowding of banking terraces causing a stampede
- Deaths: 33
- Injuries: ca. 400

The Burnden Park disaster was a crowd crush that occurred on 9 March 1946 at Burnden Park football stadium, then the home of Bolton Wanderers. The crush resulted in the deaths of 33 people and injuries to hundreds of Bolton fans. It was the deadliest stadium-related disaster in British history until the Ibrox Park disaster in 1971.

The match, an FA Cup Sixth Round second-leg tie between Bolton and Stoke City, was allowed to continue, with the game ending goalless. The disaster brought about the Moelwyn Hughes report, which recommended more rigorous control of crowd sizes.

== Disaster ==
It was estimated that the crowd was in excess of 85,000 people. Entrance to the Bolton end of the ground, which had no roof, was from the Manchester Road end only. The disaster happened at the Railway End of the ground where, in common with many other post-war grounds, facilities were rudimentary. The bank was crude, consisting of dirt with flagstones for steps. Although there was room towards the Burnden side of the ground, part of the stand had been requisitioned by the Ministry of Supply following the War and had not yet been returned to civilian use. In addition, the turnstiles at the east end of the Railway Embankment, which adjoined the Burnden Stand, had been closed since 1940.

At the time, fans paid at the turnstiles rather than buying tickets beforehand. The Railway End became over capacity and closely packed so, at 2:40 pm, it was decided to close the turnstiles. However, that did not stop more people entering the ground, with spectators climbing in from the railway, clambering over the closed turnstiles and, when a locked gate was opened, entering through it. Such was the pressure from the Railway End, that many fans were pushed inexorably along the side of the pitch, around the far end and, eventually, right out of the ground, ending up in the car park.

Shortly after the game started, the crowd began spilling onto the pitch, so the game was temporarily stopped to clear the pitch. However, two barriers then collapsed and the crowd behind them fell forward, crushing those underneath. The game was restarted but was quickly halted again when a Bolton Borough Police officer came onto the pitch to speak to the referee, George Dutton, to inform him there had been a fatality. The referee called together the two captains, Bolton's Harry Hubbick and Stoke's Neil Franklin, to inform them of the problem, and the players left the pitch.

The dead and injured were taken from the Railway End terrace, with those who had died laid along the touchline and covered in coats. A little under half an hour after the players had left the pitch, the game was restarted, with a new sawdust-lined touchline separating the players from the corpses. At the end of the first half, the players immediately changed ends and started the second half. Stanley Matthews was on the Stoke team and said later that he was sickened that the game was allowed to continue.

== Aftermath ==
Moelwyn Hughes's official report recommended more rigorous control of crowd sizes. A conference on the licensing and regulation of sports grounds where it was recommended that, as a voluntary code, local authorities should inspect grounds with a capacity of 10,000 spectators and agreed safety limits should be in place for grounds of more than 25,000 capacity. Turnstiles should mechanically record spectator numbers and grounds should have internal telephone systems.

On 24 August 1946 England and Scotland drew 2–2 in an additional fixture in aid of the Disaster Fund. All tickets for the match at Maine Road, Manchester, were sold, raising £12,000. (Note: About £430,000 today) The Burnden Park disaster was the greatest tragedy in British football history until the Ibrox Park disaster at Rangers' home ground in 1971.

In 1992 a memorial plaque was unveiled at the stadium. In 2000, following the move by Bolton Wanderers to a new ground, the plaque was relocated to the wall of the supermarket which now occupies the site of the tragedy.
