= Glamorgan Constabulary =

Police force in Wales (1841–1969)

Glamorgan Constabulary, or Glamorganshire Constabulary, was the Home Office police force for the county of Glamorgan, Wales.

The force was formed in 1841. It absorbed Neath Borough Police in 1947

In 1965, the force had an establishment of 1,153 and an actual strength of 1,055, making it by far the largest police force in Wales.

In 1969, the force amalgamated with Cardiff City Police, Swansea Borough Police and Merthyr Tydfil Borough Police (which had seceded from it in 1908) to form South Wales Constabulary.

Chief Constables

- 1841–1867 : Captain Charles Napier
- 1867–1891 : Henry Gore Lindsay
- 1891–1936 : Lionel Arthur Lindsay
- 1936–1951 : Joseph Jones
- 1951– : Cecil Haydn Watkins
