= Swansea Borough Police =

Police force in Wales (1836–1969)

Swansea Borough Police was a British police force based in Swansea which existed from 1836 to 1969.

== History and Amalgamation ==
The force was formed under Inspector William Rees with six constables. Captain Isaac Colquhoun was the Chief Constable of Swansea from 1877 to 1913. In 1957 there were 272 officers and members of the force.

In 1969 it amalgamated with Cardiff City Police, Glamorgan Constabulary and Merthyr Tydfil Borough Police to form the South Wales Constabulary.

== Head of service ==
Name	Rank	Years served
William Rees	Inspector and Head constable	1836–1851
Henry Tate	Superintendent and Head Constable	1851–1857
James Dunn	Superintendent and Head Constable	1857–1863
Lieutenant colonel John Lambrick Vivian	Head Constable	1863–1865
John Allison	Head Constable	1865–1877
Captain Isaac Colquhoun	Chief constable	1877–1913
Captain Alfred Thomas	Chief Constable	1913–1921
Richard D. Roberts	Chief Constable	1921–1927
Thomas Rawson	Chief Constable	1927–1931
Frank Joseph May	Chief Constable	1931–1941
David Victor Turner	Chief Constable	1941–19
