= Manchester City Police =

Former police force in Manchester, England

The Manchester City Police (also known as the Metropolitan Manchester City Police and from 1842 to 1853 the Manchester Borough Police) was, from the early 19th century until 1968, the territorial police force of the city of Manchester, in northern England.

Charge-books of the Manchester Division of the Lancashire County Constabulary 1842 to 1854, and summons-books 1847 to 1862, are held in the Lancashire Record Office.

Sir Robert Peacock was Chief Constable of Manchester from 1898 to 1926. In 1927, Manchester City Police was the first force in the United Kingdom to employ a female police surgeon when they appointed Nesta Wells. In 1937, Manchester City Police moved into a new headquarters building in Bootle Street, designed by the Manchester City Architect, G. Noel Hill.

Under the provisions of the Police Act 1964, Manchester City Police merged with the Salford City Police to create the Manchester and Salford Police.

== See also ==
- List of defunct law enforcement agencies in the United Kingdom
