= Bolton Borough Police =

Defunct police force

Bolton Borough Police was the police force responsible for policing the borough of Bolton, England for 130 years between 1839 and 1969.

A parliamentary report in June 1852 outlined that the borough force had 25 officers at an annual cost of £1,446, 11 Shillings and 7 pence.

William John Howard was the chief constable of the borough force between 1930 and 1957. At the time of his appointment the force numbered 202 officers which rose to 241 officers by 1957.

In March 1946 the force was in charge of policing Bolton Wanderers F.C. football stadium when the Burnden Park disaster occurred during a FA Cup match against Stoke City F.C. 33 football fans died and more than 400 were injured when barriers collapsed leading to crush and trampling injuries.

On 1 April 1969, under a compulsory amalgamation scheme ordered by the Home Secretary (under the Police Act 1964), Bolton Borough Police was abolished and became part of Lancashire Constabulary. Bolton was policed by Lancashire Constabulary for only around 5 years due to the creation of the metropolitan county of Greater Manchester on 1 April 1974 under the auspices of the Local Government Act 1972. The newly created Greater Manchester Police became responsible for policing Greater Manchester including Bolton. Bolton is currently designated as 'K' division within Greater Manchester Police for policing purposes.

== Officers killed in the line of duty ==
The following officers of Bolton Borough Police are listed by the Police Roll of Honour Trust as having died during the course of their duties:

- PC James Green. Died 25 July 1889. Aged 36. Died from injuries sustained when attempting to stop a runaway dray horse. He was run over and sustained serious injuries to his right knee and bruising to other parts of his body. His lower right leg was amputated, he died from complications.
- Acting Sergeant John Geoffrey Wood Lace. Died 4 February 1962. Aged 38. On foot patrol in Higher Bridge Street, Bolton, a van mounted the footpath and collided with him. He received severe injuries and died the following day.

== See also ==
- List of defunct law enforcement agencies in the United Kingdom
