= Special Constables Act 1831 =

Act of the Parliament of the United Kingdom

Special Constables Act 1831 (Note: The citation of this act by this short title was authorised by section 1 of, and the first schedule to, the Short Titles Act 1896. Due to the repeal of those provisions it is now authorised by section 19(2) of the Interpretation Act 1978.)
- Act of Parliament
- Parliament of the United Kingdom
- Long title: An Act for amending the Laws relative to the Appointment of Special Constables, and for the better Preservation of the Peace.
- Citation: 1 & 2 Will. 4. c. 41
- Territorial extent: England and Wales (Note: Section 21.)

Dates
- Royal assent: 15 October 1831
- Commencement: 15 October 1831 (Note: The Acts of Parliament (Commencement) Act 1793.)
- Repealed: 1 April 1965 (Note: The Police Act 1964 (Commencement No. 1) Order 1964 (SI 1964/873).)
Other legislation
| Repeals/revokes | Appointment of Special Constables Act 1820 |
| Amended by | Special Constables Act 1835; Statute Law Revision Act 1874; Summary Jurisdiction Act 1884; Public Authorities Protection Act 1893; National Assistance Act 1948; Justices of the Peace Act 1949 |
| Repealed by | Police Act 1964 |
| Relates to | Special Constables Act 1838 |

Status: Repealed

Text of statute as originally enacted

The Special Constables Act 1831 (1 & 2 Will. 4. c. 41) was an act of the Parliament of the United Kingdom, given royal assent on 15 October 1831.

It provided a long-term framework for the use, appointment and operation of special constables in England and Wales. It is often seen as the foundation date for the Metropolitan Special Constabulary, the special constabulary attached to the Metropolitan Police, which had itself been founded only two years earlier.

== Subsequent developments ==
Section 19 of the act was repealed by section 2 of, and the schedule to, the Public Authorities Protection Act 1893 (56 & 57 Vict. c. 61), which came into force on 1 January 1894.

The whole act was repealed by section 64(3) of, and part I of schedule 10 to, the Police Act 1964, which came into force on 1 April 1965.

== See also ==
- Special Constabulary#History
