= Barnsley Borough Police =

Defunct police force

Barnsley Borough Police was the police force operating in county borough of Barnsley, England from 1 July 1896 until 1 October 1968.

Until 1896 Barnsley was policed by the West Riding Constabulary. In June of that year the borough appointed its first chief constable and formed a separate police force. The force was merged with other forces in 1968 to form the West Yorkshire Constabulary. The area passed to the South Yorkshire Police in 1974.

== Chief Constables ==
The following individuals held the office of Chief Constable of Barnsley:

- David Henry Turner 1896-98 (previously an inspector in the Dewsbury Borough Police, appointed Chief Constable of Oldham in April 1898.)
- George Henry Butler 1898-1939
- Henry Thomas Williams 1939-44
- George Parfitt 1944-66 (died September 1966)
- William Brown 1966-68 (Acting Chief Constable)
