= Doncaster Borough Police =

Defunct police force

Doncaster Borough Police was the police force operating in the county borough of Doncaster, England from 1836 until 1 October 1968. The force was then merged with others to form a West Yorkshire Constabulary. From 1974 its area passed to the South Yorkshire Police.
