= County Police Act 1839 =

Act of the Parliament of the United Kingdom

County Police Act 1839 (Note: The citation of this act by this short title was authorised by section 1 of, and the first schedule to, the Short Titles Act 1896. Due to the repeal of those provisions it is now authorised by section 19(2) of the Interpretation Act 1978.)
- Act of Parliament
- Parliament of the United Kingdom
- Long title: An Act for the Establishment of County and District Constables by the Authority of the Justices of the Peace.
- Citation: 2 & 3 Vict. c. 93
- Introduced by: Lord John Russell (Lords)
- Territorial extent: England and Wales

Dates
- Royal assent: 27 August 1839
- Commencement: 27 August 1839 (Note: The Acts of Parliament (Commencement) Act 1793.)
- Repealed: 1 April 1965 (Note: The Police Act 1964 (Commencement No. 1) Order 1964 (SI 1964/873).)
Other legislation
Amended by	County Police Act 1840; County and Borough Police Act 1856; Statute Law Revision Act 1874 (No. 2); Territorial Army and Militia Act 1921; Local Government Act 1933; Representation of the People Act 1948; Magistrates' Courts Act 1952; Licensing Act 1953
Repealed by	Police Act 1964

Status: Repealed

Text of statute as originally enacted

The County Police Act 1839 (2 & 3 Vict. c. 93) (also known as the Rural Police Act or the Rural Constabularies Act) was an act of the Parliament of the United Kingdom. It was one of the Police Acts 1839 to 1893. The act enabled Justices of the Peace in England and Wales to establish police forces in their counties. Such establishment was not compulsory, and constabularies had only been established in 25 out of 55 counties by 1856, when the County and Borough Police Act 1856 (19 & 20 Vict. c. 69) made their provision mandatory.

== Royal commission ==
The legislation was based on the recommendations of a royal commission appointed in 1836 to "inquire into the best means of establishing an efficient constabulary force in the counties of England and Wales". The three members of the commission, or "Constabulary Commissioners" as they were informally called, were Colonel Charles Rowan, Commissioner of the Metropolitan Police, Edwin Chadwick and Charles Shaw Lefevre. The commission was appointed against a background of unrest and violence in some areas of the country, with protests against the New Poor Law and agitation by Chartists for social and political reform. Chadwick was strongly in favour of the creation of a single centralised force, but this was opposed not only by the two other commissioners, but also by the Home Secretary, Lord John Russell. Russell wrote to the magistrates of the various counties asking them to support the resolution passed in Shropshire to establish a body of constables paid for out of the county rate and under the control of the magistrates. The commission's report, issued in 1839, followed the lines favoured by Russell. It recommended that "a properly trained and equipped preventative police force" based on the pattern of the existing Metropolitan Police, should be established in all counties where the magistrates were in favour. Each force should be funded mostly by local rates, with 25% of the cost met by central government. The force would be under the supervision of the county magistrates, who would have the power to employ or remove officers, subject to statutory regulations.

== Provisions of the act ==
The act allowed justices of the peace of any county, in general or quarter sessions, to appoint constables "for the preservation of the peace and protection of the inhabitants" where they felt the existing system of parish constables was insufficient.

The constables were to be appointed on a ratio of not more than one officer per one thousand of population. Boroughs operating under the Municipal Corporations Act 1835 had the power to form their own police force and were to be excluded from the jurisdiction of the county police.

In each county where the act was adopted a chief constable was to be appointed. Where a county was divided into two parliamentary divisions by the Reform Act 1832, a chief constable could be appointed to each division. It was also permitted for one chief constable to be appointed to two or more neighbouring counties.

For the purposes of the act all county exclaves were to be part of the county by which they were surrounded, or with which they had the longest common boundary. All franchises or liberties, other than reformed boroughs, were also to come under the county police.

A "county" for the purposes of the act was defined as "any County, Riding or Division having a separate Court of Quarter Sessions of the Peace or in which separate County Rates are made". The act was not to extend to the Metropolitan Police District.

== Establishing a force ==
In order to establish a force in a county, it was necessary for three or more magistrates to make a requisition to the chairman of the quarter sessions to bring the matter to a vote. If the sessions chose to adopt the act, they were obliged to prepare a report on the area and population of the county and the existing method of policing. The report would set out how it was proposed to apply the legislation to the county, detailing the number of constables, the divisions of the county and the salaries to be paid and making any additional rules and regulations deemed necessary. The report was then submitted for approval to the Home Secretary, who could modify parts of the scheme but did not have the power to alter the number of constables or their salaries. The sessions had the power to choose a chief constable, but his appointment was also subject to the approval of the Home Secretary. In some cases magistrates chose to form a force in only part of a county.

The first county to form a constabulary under the 1839 Act was Wiltshire. On 13 November the court of quarter sessions agreed to adopt the act, and on 28 November appointed Commander Samuel Meredith RN as chief constable. The appointment was approved on 5 December, and Wiltshire's example was quickly followed by Gloucestershire, Worcestershire and Durham.

== Amendment: the County Police Act 1840 ==
County Police Act 1840
- Act of Parliament
- Parliament of the United Kingdom
- Long title: An Act to Amend the Act for the Establishment of County and District Constables.
- Citation: 3 & 4 Vict. c. 88
- Introduced by: Fox Maule
- Territorial extent: England and Wales (Note: Long title.)

Dates
- Royal assent: 7 August 1840
- Commencement: 7 August 1840
- Repealed: 1 April 1965
Other legislation
Amends	County Police Act 1839
Amended by	Statute Law Revision Act 1874 (No. 2); Rating and Valuation Act 1925; Local Government Act 1933
Repealed by	Police Act 1964

Status: Repealed

Text of statute as originally enacted

Within a few months of the first county constabularies being formed, a number of problems with the legislation became apparent. Accordingly, the Hon. Fox Maule introduced a bill to the House of Commons in February 1840. Maule outlined the problems:

"...difficulties had arisen from the mode of payment provided for carrying into effect the regulations of the act, by levying it out of the county rates; a difficulty as to that provision had arisen in various counties, in which certain districts only had adopted the act. In counties, also, in which there were isolated portions of other counties, it was difficult to say how those isolated portions were to be dealt with, because they were incorporated in the police districts of another county than that in which they were rated for the payment..."

The bill was enacted as the County Police Act 1840 (3 & 4 Vict. c. 88). It provided inter alia for the voluntary merging of borough police forces with county constabularies and the levying of a new "police rate".

The main provisions of the act were:

- Justices of the peace were permitted to transfer areas from one county to another for police purposes.
- A special police rate was to be levied to finance the county constabulary, instead of the cost being part of the general county rate.
- Where parts of one county were policed by the constabulary of another county, the rate payers were to pay the police rate to the county providing the constables.
- Boroughs were permitted to consolidate their police force with that of the county in which they were situate, and a single chief constable could be appointed for a consolidated force.
- The chief constable of a consolidated force could dismiss borough constables, but new constables for the area were to be appointed by the Watch Committee of the borough corporation.
- Justices were empowered to divide the county into districts, each with a population of not less than 25,000. Separate police rates could be levied on ratepayers of each division. However, constables were liable to serve throughout the county, regardless of which district they were assigned to.
- The act repeated the definition of a county as in the 1839 Act, and noted that the Isle of Ely should be considered a county for constabulary purposes.
- Permission was given to the justices to acquire land and buildings, and borrow money for the construction of police stations and to build strong rooms for the temporary confinement of prisoners.
- If, in the opinion of the justices in quarter sessions, the constables provided under the 1839 Act were no longer needed, they could disband them, having given six months notice to the Home Secretary. No county forces were dis-established, and a resolution in 1843 to dissolve the Worcestershire Constabulary as "the benefit derived from the employment of the rural police in the County of Worcester has not been equal to the expense it has occasioned to the ratepayers" was soundly defeated.

== List of forces established under the County Police Acts ==
By 1856 constabularies had been formed to cover all or part of the following counties: In that year the County and Borough Police Act 1856 made the formation of police forces compulsory in all counties.

County	Notes
Bedfordshire	Force established 25 March 1840
Berkshire	14 January 1856
Breconshire	Acts not adopted
Buckinghamshire	Acts not adopted
Cambridgeshire	Isle of Ely: 15 July 1841
Cambridgeshire	Cambridgeshire: 20 November 1851
Cardiganshire	Adopted in part of the county 5 March 1844. Extended to rest of county in 1846.
Carmarthenshire	Adopted in 1843
Carnarvonshire	Acts not adopted
Cheshire	Force formed under Cheshire Constabulary Act 1852
Cornwall	Acts not adopted
Cumberland	Formed in Derwent Ward 31 December 1839, Leath Ward July 1851, Allerdale Ward above Derwent 17 May 1853, Allerdale Ward below Derwent 9 January 1855, Cumberland Ward 20 October 1855.
Denbighshire	25 May 1840 for whole county. County force abolished 1 January 1851 on grounds of cost. Separate Denbigh and Wrexham District Constabularies 1851-56. Force compulsorily reconsolidated by Police Act 1856.
Derbyshire	Acts not adopted
Devon	Acts not adopted
Dorset	Constables appointed in the consolidated divisions of Sturminster Newton 27 September 1849 and Shaftesbury 29 October 1850 and in the Borough of Shaftesbury 1 May 1851.
Durham	Adopted 19 November 1839
Essex	Act adopted 25 November 1839, chief constable appointed 11 February 1840
Flintshire	Acts not adopted
Glamorgan	11 July 1841
Gloucestershire	1 December 1839, absorbed Tewkesbury Borough Police July 1854.
Hampshire	Act adopted December 1839. Chief constable elected by magistrates on 31 December 1839.
Herefordshire	Police established in Kington District only, 5 April 1841.
Hertfordshire	12 May 1841.
Huntingdonshire	Superintending constables appointed for each of the four divisions of the county under The Parish Constables Act 1850.
Kent	Acts not adopted
Lancashire	6 December 1839
Leicestershire	21 December 1839
Lincolnshire	Parts of Holland - Acts not adopted
Lincolnshire	Parts of Kesteven - Acts not adopted
Lincolnshire	Parts of Lindsey - Acts not adopted
Merionethshire	Acts not adopted
Montgomeryshire	Adopted in 1840
Norfolk	Established 1 January 1840.
Northamptonshire	Northamptonshire 7 April 1840
Northamptonshire	Liberty of Peterborough - Acts not adopted
Northumberland	Acts not adopted
Nottinghamshire	1 November 1840
Oxfordshire	Acts not adopted
Rutland	29 June 1848. The constabulary initially consisted of one constable.
Shropshire	December 1839
Somerset	Acts not adopted
Staffordshire	1839 - originally only in the southern division of Offlow Hundred. Extended to entire county in 1843
Suffolk	Eastern Division Chief Constable elected 11 March 1840.
Suffolk	Western Division Act adopted 1844
Surrey	Constabulary formed in February 1851 in the part of the county not included in the Metropolitan Police District
Sussex	Eastern Division 2 October 1840
Sussex	Western Division Acts not adopted
Warwickshire	In Knightlow Hundred from 1840; a second force created in Barlichway Hundred in 1855.
Westmorland	Lonsdale Ward 1846, East Ward 1849, Kendal Ward (consolidated with Kendal Borough Police) 1852, West Ward (under superintendence of Cumberland Constabulary) 1854.
Wiltshire	Adopted in October 1839.
Worcestershire	Adopted in 1839
Yorkshire	East Riding Appointed 1849 in South Hunsley Beacon Division only.
Yorkshire	North Riding Acts not adopted
Yorkshire	West Riding Acts not adopted
Yorkshire	Liberty of Ripon Acts not adopted

== Subsequent developments ==
The whole act was repealed by section 64(3) of, and part I of the tenth schedule to, the Police Act 1964, which came into force on 1 April 1965.
