= Thomas Hartley Montgomery =

Royal Irish Constabulary officer convicted of murder

- Born: 12 March 1842; Cavan, County Cavan, Ireland
- Died: 26 August 1873 (aged 30–31); Omagh Gaol, County Tyrone, Ireland
- Cause of death: Execution by hanging
- Spouse: Annie Bell (m. 1870)
- Police career
- Country: United Kingdom
- Branch: Royal Irish Constabulary
- Rank: Sub-Inspector
- Criminal information
- Criminal charges: Murder
- Penalty: Death penalty

Sub-Inspector Thomas Hartley Montgomery (c. 1842 – 26 August 1873, Omagh, Ireland) was an officer of the Royal Irish Constabulary. He is the only police officer in Irish history to receive the death penalty for murder.

== Newtownstewart Murder ==
On 29 June 1871, Sub-Inspector Montgomery, who was chronically short of funds, assaulted William Glass, a clerk employed by the Northern Bank, with a hedge knife and stabbed him through the head with a filing spike. Sub-Inspector Montgomery then stole £1,600 from the till. In the aftermath, Inspector Montgomery took charge of the investigation and briefly succeeded in deflecting suspicion from himself. However, Montgomery's subordinates ultimately learned of his financial difficulties and eyewitnesses identified him as having left the bank one hour before the body of William Glass was discovered. As a result, a County Tyrone coroner's inquest brought a verdict of willful murder against Sub-Inspector Montgomery.

After two mistrials, the disgraced policeman was convicted of murder and hanged in the Omagh Gaol on the 26 August 1873. His last words were "May Lord have mercy on my soul"
