= Coventry City Police =

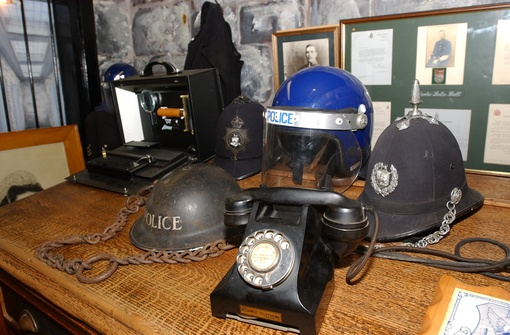
- Exhibits at the Coventry Police Museum including the historic charge desk which was used for over 100 years

Agency overview
- Formed: 1836
- Preceding agency: none
- Dissolved: 1969
- Superseding agency: Warwickshire and Coventry Constabulary

Jurisdictional structure
- Operations jurisdiction: England

Coventry City Police was a police force in the city of Coventry, then in Warwickshire, England, from 1836 to 1969.

== History ==
The force was created under powers conferred to the City by the Municipal Corporations Act 1835, and was overseen by the local watch committee.

In 1965, Coventry's Chief Constable Edward Pendleton predicted:

hidden television cameras, helicopters and high frequency pocket radios — all these will become part of the policeman's normal every-day life in Coventry by the year 2000

Using powers created by the Police Act 1964, the then Home Secretary decided in 1966 to merge the city force with that of the county, the Warwickshire Police as the Warwickshire and Coventry Constabulary. This took effect in 1969. From 1 April 1974, Coventry's police were transferred to the newly formed West Midlands Police.

== Chief Constables ==
- 1836–1857: Thomas Henry Prosser
- 1857–1861: Thomas Skermer
- 1861–1862: Thomas Henry Prosser
- 1862–1890: John Norris
- 1890–1899: Alexander Gray
- 1899–1918: Charles Christopher Charsley
- 1918–1927: William Imber
- 1927–1946: Capt. Stanley Albert Hector
- 1946–1948: George Jackson
- 1948–1969: Edward Pendleton
