= Cardiff City Police =

Police force in Wales (1836–1969)

Cardiff Borough Police was a police force for the Borough of Cardiff, formed in 1836. It was later renamed Cardiff City Police in 1905 when Cardiff attained city status. Notable events in its history included dealing with the 1919 race riots in the city.

It became defunct in 1969 on its merger into the South Wales Constabulary. Its archives are held at Glamorgan Archives and it is also represented in the South Wales Police Museum.
