= West Yorkshire Constabulary =

Former English territorial police force

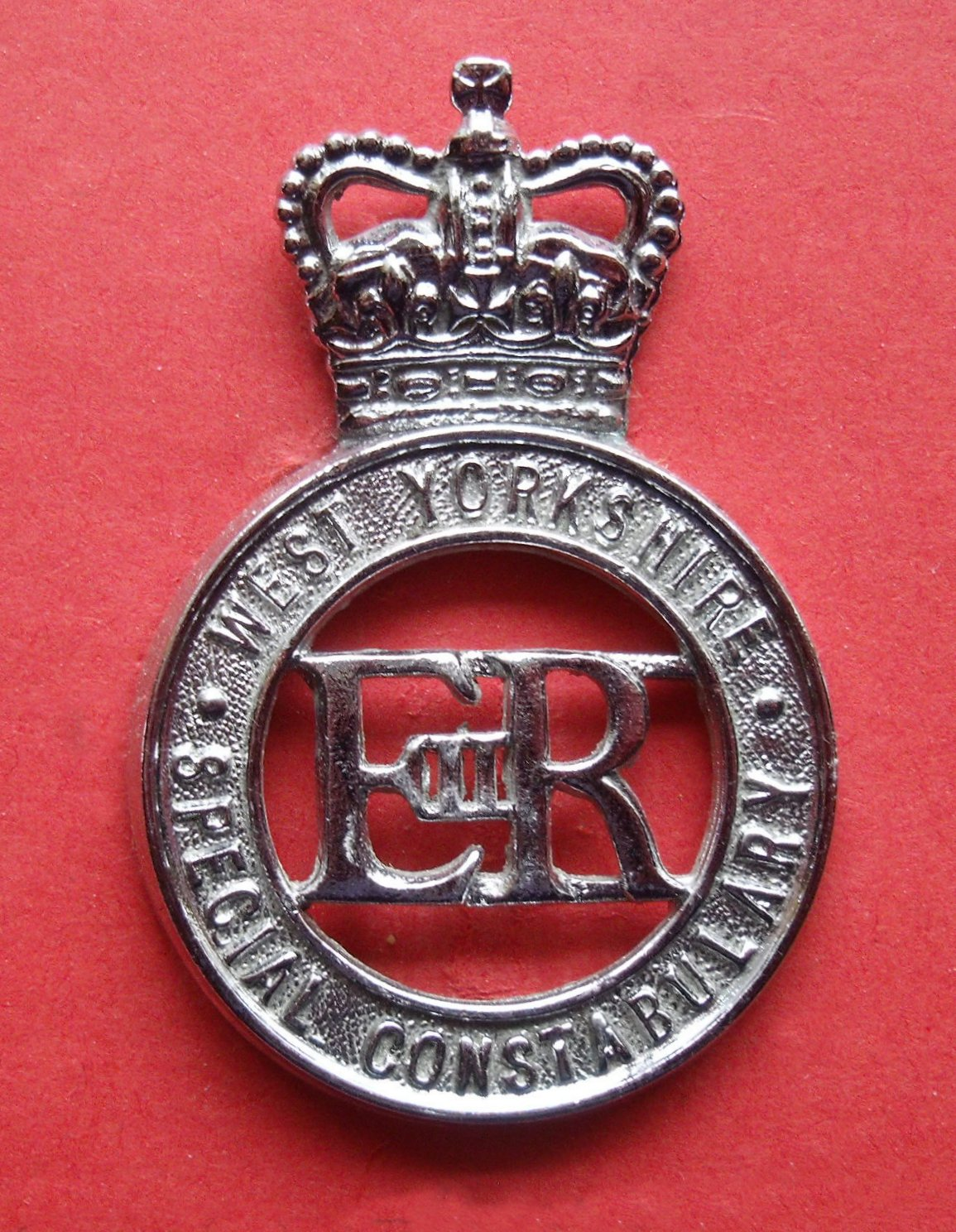
Cap badge of the West Yorkshire Special Constabulary

The West Yorkshire Constabulary (WYC) was, from 1968 to 1974, the statutory police force for the West Riding of Yorkshire, in northern England.

It was formed under the Police Act 1964, and was a merger of the previous West Riding Constabulary along with six borough forces for the county boroughs of Barnsley, Dewsbury, Doncaster, Halifax, Huddersfield, Wakefield. The other four West Riding county boroughs, Bradford, Leeds, Sheffield and Rotherham, retained independent police forces (a merged force for Sheffield/Rotherham).

The West Riding Constabulary had been originally set up in 1856, as required by the County and Borough Police Act 1856. The first Chief Constable was Lt Col C. A. Cobbe. The force's strength was 354 by the end of the year, and its headquarters were at Wakefield.

In 1974 the force was split, under the Local Government Act 1972. The bulk of the force went to form the new West Yorkshire Police (with Bradford and Leeds) and South Yorkshire Police (with Sheffield and Rotherham Constabulary the former Barnsley and Doncaster County Borough forces and the interlinked county areas), with other parts coming under the North Yorkshire Police, Cumbria Constabulary, Humberside Police, and Lancashire Police forces. The sub-division of Saddleworth, part of the Huddersfield division of the West Yorkshire Constabulary, was taken into the new Greater Manchester Police.

== Chief constables ==
West Riding Constabulary (1856–1968)

- 1856–1869 : Lieutenant Colonel Charles Augustus Cobbe
- 1935–1943: George Campbell Vaughan was the first Chief Constable of the West Riding Constabulary who had risen up through the ranks, having joined at Rotherham in 1910 as a Constable. He took over as Chief Constable from Lt-Col Frank Brook who had been appointed one of His Majesty's Inspectors of Constabulary. Awarded the CBE in 1942 for excellence in police work Campbell Vaughan established the Detective Training School & Police College at Wakefield, a flagship institution for many years within UK policing. In 1943, he broke new ground by paying policewomen the same wages as their male counterparts. He was 53 when he retired, and Wilf Blacker (Deputy Chief Constable) held the post from November 1943 to May 1944 when Henry Studdy, a decorated World War One Indian Army Officer and career policeman took over. Sir Henry – as he later became – had previously served as Chief Constable of Northumberland, and then of Durham, after a police career in India, mainly as a detective.
- 1944–1959 : Sir Henry Studdy
- 1959–1969 : George Edward Scott

West Yorkshire Constabulary (1968–1974)

- 1969–1974 : Ronald Gregory
