= County and Borough Police Act 1856 =

Act of the Parliament of the United Kingdom

County and Borough Police Act 1856 (Note: The citation of this act by this short title was authorised by section 1 of, and the first schedule to, the Short Titles Act 1896. Due to the repeal of those provisions it is now authorised by section 19(2) of the Interpretation Act 1978.)
- Act of Parliament
- Parliament of the United Kingdom
- Long title: An Act to render more effectual the Police in Counties and Boroughs in England and Wales.
- Citation: 19 & 20 Vict. c. 69
- Territorial extent: England and Wales (Note: Preamble.)

Dates
- Royal assent: 21 July 1856
- Commencement: 1 December 1856 (Note: Section 1.)
- Repealed: 1 August 1964 (Note: The Police Act 1964 (Commencement No. 1) Order 1964.)
Other legislation
Amends	County Police Act 1840
Amended by	Police Superannuation Act 1865; Statute Law Revision Act 1875; Representation of the People Act 1948
Repealed by	Police Act 1964

Status: Repealed

Text of statute as originally enacted

The County and Borough Police Act 1856 (19 & 20 Vict. c. 69) or the Police Act 1856 or the County Constabulary Act 1856 was an act of the Parliament of the United Kingdom. It was one of the Police Acts 1839 to 1893. The act made it compulsory for a police force to be established in any county which had not previously formed a constabulary.

The act required that in any county where a constabulary had not already been established for all or part of the county, then the justices of the peace for the county should at the next general or quarter sessions held after 1 December 1856 proceed to establish a sufficient police force.

Where the Secretary of State received certified notice that an efficient police force had been established in any county or borough, then one quarter of the costs of pay and clothing for constables would be met by the Treasury.

However, boroughs maintaining a separate police force and having a population of 5,000 or less were to receive no financial support, thereby encouraging smaller forces to consolidate with the county police.

Finally, the act provided that the Cheshire Constabulary, which had been established by a local act of Parliament, the Cheshire Constables Act 1829 (10 Geo. 4. c. xcvii), and amended by the Cheshire Constabulary Act 1852 (15 & 16 Vict. c. xxxi), would be replaced by a force under the terms of the new act.

== Subsequent developments ==
The whole act was repealed by section 64(3) of, and part I schedule 10 to, the Police Act 1964, which came into force on 1 August 1964.
