= List of statutory instruments of the United Kingdom, 1964 =

This is an incomplete list of statutory instruments of the United Kingdom in 1964.

== Statutory instruments ==
=== 1-499 ===
- West Shropshire Water Board Order 1963 (SI 1964/21)
- Prison Rules 1964 (SI 1964/388)
- Road Vehicles (Index Marks) Regulations 1964 (SI 1964/404)

=== 500-999 ===
- Benefit Regulations 1964 (SI 1964/504)
- Sheffield Water Order 1964 (SI 1964/670)
- Offices, Shops and Railway Premises Act 1963 (Exemption No. 1) Order 1964 (SI 1964/964)
- Washing Facilities Regulations 1964 (SI 1964/965)
- Sanitary Conveniences Regulations 1964 (SI 1964/966)

=== 1000-1499 ===
- Examination of Steam Boiler Reports (No 1) Order 1964 (SI 1964/1070)
- Industrial Training (Construction Board) Order 1964 (SI 1964/1079)
- Industrial Training (Engineering Board) Order 1964 (SI 1964/1086)
- Artificial Insemination of Pigs (Scotland) Regulations 1964 (SI 1964/1171)
- Artificial Insemination of Pigs (England and Wales) Regulations 1964 (SI 1964/1172)
- Television Act 1964 (Channel Islands) Order 1964 (SI 1964/1202)
- Act of Adjournal (Rules for Legal Aid in Criminal Proceedings) 1964 (SI 1964/1409)
- Act of Adjournal (Criminal Legal Aid Fees) 1964 (SI 1964/1410)

=== 1500-1999 ===
- Legal Aid (Scotland) (Expenses of Successful Unassisted Parties) Regulations 1964 (SI 1964/1513)
- Plant Varieties and Seeds (Northern Ireland) Order 1964 (SI 1964/1574)
- Fishing Boats (France) Designation Order 1964 (SI 1964/1598)
- Act of Sederunt (Legal Aid Rules) 1964 (SI 1964/1622)
- North West Leicestershire Water Board Order 1964 (SI 1964/1712)
- South Lincolnshire Water Board Order 1964 (SI 1964/1746)
- Traffic Signs Regulations and General Directions 1964 (SI 1964/1857)
- Barnsley Corporation (Reduction of Compensation Water) Order 1964 (SI 1964/1866)

=== 2000-2499 ===
- Transport Act 1962 (Commencement No. 2) Order 1964 (SI 1964/2025)
- Diplomatic Privileges (Citizens of the United Kingdom and Colonies) Order 1964 (SI 1964/2043)
- War Pensions (Mercantile Marine) Scheme 1964 (SI 1964/2058)

== See also ==
- List of statutory instruments of the United Kingdom
