= History of the Belfast Fire Brigade =

The Belfast Fire Brigade came into existence in 1800, and until 1861 was managed jointly with the local police service. It then provided a dedicated firefighting service to the people of the city of Belfast until its amalgamation with the Northern Ireland Fire Authority on 1 October 1973, when it became the Fire Authority for Northern Ireland, today the Northern Ireland Fire and Rescue Service (founded in July 2006).

== Early history ==
The original settlement, which later became Belfast, was situated about a ford which crossed the River Lagan, dating back to the seventh century. In 1306, mention is made of a chapel on a ford, where the current day St George's Church, Belfast is situated. At this time church bells may have been the first mechanical means of mobilising people to extinguish a fire in the area.

Bangor Northern Ireland

In subsequent years, little development took place in firefighting equipment and procedures, other than the use of basic hand tools and ladders plus leather buckets, which were used to transport water from open water supplies to the scene of fire. On Sunday, 25 April 1708, a fire broke out in Belfast Castle, which killed five young women and completely destroyed the castle. The limited capability of firefighting equipment used in the attempt to extinguish the fire was a major contributing factor according to the first account of the Fire Brigade in Belfast circa 1740, as recorded in A history of the town of Belfast (page 609):

"Twelve or more round holes covered with flags be made in Front Street (High Street) at different parts of the arch which covers the river; that six movable barrel pumps be made; that six decent men be taught to work, take asunder, and put them together at a salary of 30 shillings a year each, and a crown every time they attend a real fire.... This was the Fire Brigade of more than 90 years ago."

== 19th century ==
The 1800 Belfast Police Act established the Belfast Police Board, which was responsible for upkeep of the streets, the removal of nuisances, and provision of a night watch. It established a uniformed police force, the Belfast Borough Police, that also undertook firefighting duties. "They immediately set aside £143.8.2 for the purchase of a new fire engine from Tilley and Company of Blackfriars Road in London."

During the early 1800s several approaches were made by the Belfast Corporation to insurance companies for financial assistance in the support of the Belfast Fire Brigade, but very limited investment was made. Such financial support was commonplace throughout larger towns and cities in England and Scotland. In 1840 Belfast purchased its first steam powered fire engine; manufacturer Merryweather & Sons supplied the engine the following year; this greatly reduced the time taken for the brigade to attend fire incidents and also increased the area served by the brigade.

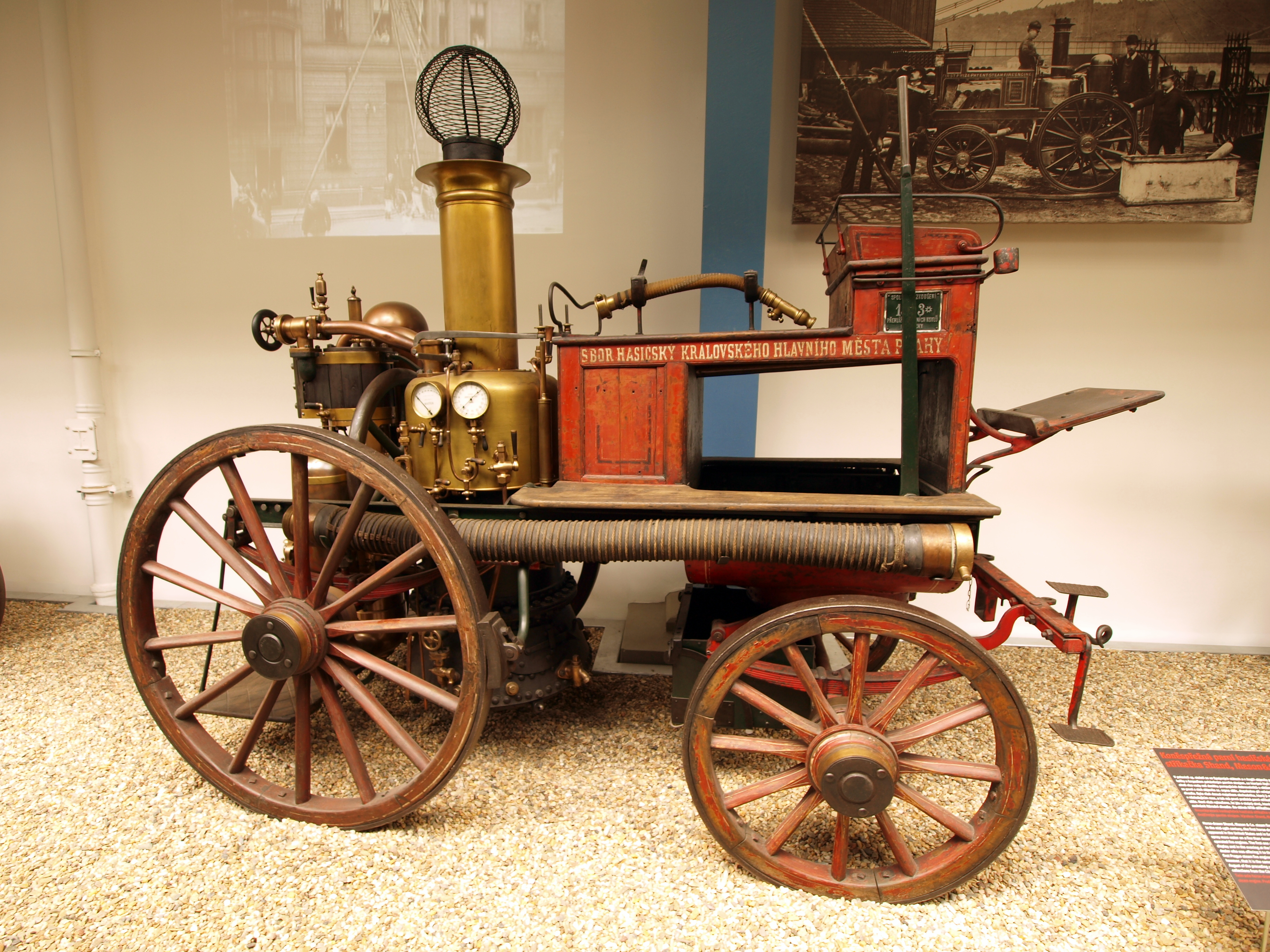
1882 Horse-drawn Shand, Mason & Co. steam fire engine circa 1868

From June 1860 to September 1861 the Belfast Fire Brigade was under the leadership of Eyre Massey Shaw, who, during his short period as superintendent, produced reports in relation to several major fires within Belfast, focusing on the inadequacies of the water mains in the city. In 1861 Massey Shaw took up the role of superintendent of the London Fire Engine Establishment and subsequently became the first chief officer of the London Fire Brigade.

After Massey Shaw's departure, it was decided to separate the Police and Fire Brigade, with George Reilly being appointed the fire brigade's first superintendent, serving in this position until 1891. In 1892, after Reilly's retirement, the Belfast Corporation sought to fulfil a long planned restructuring of the brigade which saw a move from a semi-professional to a fully professional Fire Brigade. Under the leadership of Superintendent George Parker, who formerly held the position of Chief Fire Officer in Bootle, Liverpool, he sought to introduce new items of protective uniform and equipment. Other major changes which occurred at this time included the phasing out of auxiliary firemen, alterations to working rotas and leave entitlements, along with reviewed rates of pay. In May 1894 the new Belfast Fire Brigade headquarters and fire station in Chichester Street opened. The premises incorporated; fire station, headquarters offices, dwelling houses to provide accommodation for firemen and their families, accommodation for single firemen, and a paved drill yard and 130-foot tall drill tower.

== The 20th century ==
With the introduction of the 20th century, along with a rapidly growing population, Belfast required the construction of more fire stations to service the community. Between 1904 and 1905, stations were opened in Ardoyne, Albert Bridge Road, the Shankill Road and Whitla Street. Developments in the motor car industry were quickly incorporated into the design of fire engines. This technology was soon introduced into the Belfast Fire Brigade, and in 1911 they were to become the first Fire Brigade within the United Kingdom to become fully motorised. This advance in mechanisation saw the demise of the horse drawn steam powered fire engine.

== World War II ==
Due to the deteriorating political situation in Europe in the late 1930s, preparation was made in Belfast to protect the city against potential aerial attack from the German Luftwaffe. The Belfast Corporation then introduced the Auxiliary Fire Service (AFS). The equipment and training available to the AFS, though considerably limited, proved to be an essential service to augment the full-time firemen of the Belfast Fire Brigade.

During the spring of 1941, Belfast was attacked from the air by the German Luftwaffe. On the night of Easter Tuesday, 1941, around 180 German planes dropped 200 tonnes of high explosives on Belfast, and fires from 29,000 incendiary bombs ravaged the city.

Almost 1,000 people were killed, including two AFS Firemen working in York street, two of only three or four Firemen, depending on the viewpoint, killed in the line of duty in the history of the BFB. Over 100,000 people were left homeless in the attack.

In addition to the local fire brigades, assistance was sought and received from the Republic of Ireland Fire Brigades.During the period of the Blitzes the border remained open between the North and the South.For many years later this led to an annual soccer match between the BFB and the DFB with an alternating venue a rather feeble excuse for camaraderie and slaking of thirst!

On 3 December 1941 legislation was passed to establish a National Fire Service (NFS) throughout Great Britain, whilst the Fire Services (Emergency Provisions) Act (Northern Ireland) 1942 (6 & 7 Geo. 6. c. 5 (N.I.)) was passed in Northern Ireland. The introduction of the NFS was to overcome difficulties faced by local Fire Brigades during the war effort.

== Post-war ==
Shortly after the end of the war in 1945, central government sought to disband the NFS and return responsibility to the local authority. This came about in 1947 with the introduction of four fire brigades in Northern Ireland; Northern Command, Southern Command, Western Command and Belfast City. In 1950 the four fire brigades were formed into two fire authorities; the 'Belfast Fire Brigade' for Belfast, and the 'Northern Ireland Fire Authority' being responsible for the other three commands. During 1951 a central control room was established at the new headquarters in Lisburn, which was able to monitor fire appliance availability and incidents throughout Northern Ireland, though the BFB retained its own mobilising until amalgamation in 1973 when its Control Room became redundant. With the continued recovery and redevelopment of the city after the destruction during the Blitz, there was a requirement to further increase the provision of fire cover in the city. This requirement was fulfilled on 5 October 1954 with the opening of the Cadogan fire station, situated at the junction of Cadogan Park and Lisburn Road. The major change which occurred with the opening of Cadogan fire station, over those which had been built during the previous 60 years, was the cessation of on-site accommodation for firemen and their families. This development allowed firemen and their families to live elsewhere, other than on the premises of the fire station. The firemen were only required to remain on the grounds of the station during hours of work, which at this time were 84 hours per week.

In the late 1960s civil unrest ensued, due to the deteriorating political situation in Northern Ireland. During the month of April 1969, over a series of nights, three water mains were blown up which supplied water to Belfast. To augment the mains supply of water, which had been damaged, a variety of commercial businesses provided vehicles which could transport water to the city. These included milk, petrol and drinks company tankers. On the night of 20 April 10 premises were attacked, which stretched the firefighting resources available in Belfast. The incidents were attended by 20 pumps and a variety of water tankers to supply water for firefighting, and in the words of the Chief Fire Officer, Captain R. Mitchell M.C.:

"It must have been a source of wonderment and surprise to the citizens of Belfast to see Firemen pull up at a fire to put it out with what would appear to be milk, Guinness or indeed petrol. But then the Fire Service has always been adaptable,"

== Amalgamation ==
At the commencement of the 1970s, pressure was placed upon local government to reduce the number of councils, so, in consultation with the Fire Brigade Union (FBU), the agreed best option was the amalgamation of the two local fire brigades in Northern Ireland. From 1 October 1973, the Northern Ireland Fire Brigade, under the administration of the Northern Ireland Fire Authority, became the one amalgamated fire brigade for the whole of Northern Ireland, thus consigning the Belfast Fire Brigade to the illustrious pages of history.

Unique among UK fire brigades was the BFB's circular cap badge which was not mounted on the traditional eight-pointed star of the Knights Hospitallers of St. John of Jerusalem as it subsequently was under the new NIFB badge. The BFB motto 'Pro Tanto Quid Retribuamus' (For what we give what shall we receive) still stands a reminder to fire authority elected members and the public of the personal price to be paid for such valiant service over centuries to the communities they served.

Mr. George Morrison, who previously held the position of Fire Force Commander of the Northern Ireland Fire Authority, became the first Chief Fire Officer of the Northern Ireland Fire Brigade (NIFB).
