= Eyre Massey Shaw =

British firefighter (1828–1908)

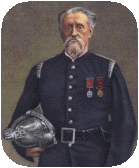
- Colourised photograph of Captain Shaw
- Born: 17 January 1830; Ballymore, County Cork, Ireland
- Died: 25 August 1908 (aged 78); Folkestone, Kent, England
- Resting place: Highgate Cemetery, London
- Education: Trinity College, Dublin
- Title: Superintendent of the Metropolitan Fire Brigade
- Term: 1861–1891
- Predecessor: James Braidwood
- Successor: James Sexton Simmonds
- Awards: Knight Commander of the Order of the Bath
- Military career
- Branch: British Army
- Service years: 1854–1860
- Rank: Captain
- Unit: North Cork Rifles

Captain Sir Eyre Massey Shaw KCB (17 January 1830 – 25 August 1908) was the first Chief Officer of the Metropolitan Fire Brigade (now renamed the London Fire Brigade), and the Superintendent of its predecessor, the London Fire Engine Establishment, from 1861 to 1891. He introduced modern firefighting methods to the Brigade, and increased the number of stations. Prior to entering firefighting, Shaw was in the British Army, followed by a spell as Chief Constable of Belfast Borough Police.

== Early life ==
Shaw was born in Ballymore, County Cork, Ireland and was educated first at a school in the nearby town of Cobh, and then at Trinity College, Dublin where he graduated in 1847.

Shaw was originally set on taking holy orders to become a priest, but following his degree, he decided to travel to the United States. He travelled for four- to five years, and in that time witnessed a number of large fires and the techniques being used at that time to fight them. This started a fascination with firefighting that would last for the rest of his life.

== Career ==
=== Militia ===
Shaw returned to Ireland in 1854, where he gained a commission in the North Cork Rifles, a militia regiment (later the 9th Battalion, King's Royal Rifle Corps). He also married within the year a Portuguese lady from Lisbon. They had two sons; the first named after his father.

During his period of service, he reached the rank of captain.

=== Belfast police ===
In 1860 Belfast Corporation advertised for someone to be the superintendent of both police and fire services for the city, and Shaw submitted his CV for consideration. Despite not being experienced or qualified for the job, he was awarded the position and moved to Belfast to take up the role of Inspector of Belfast Borough Police and Director of the fire Brigade in June 1860, on a salary of £300 a year, resigning his army position.

His appointment was regarded as successful both on policing and firefighting. He was credited with quelling rioting between Catholics and Protestants whilst maintaining the respect of both, as well as transforming a poorly organised fire service, including making extensive recommendations for modernisation of equipment and practices.

=== Move to London ===
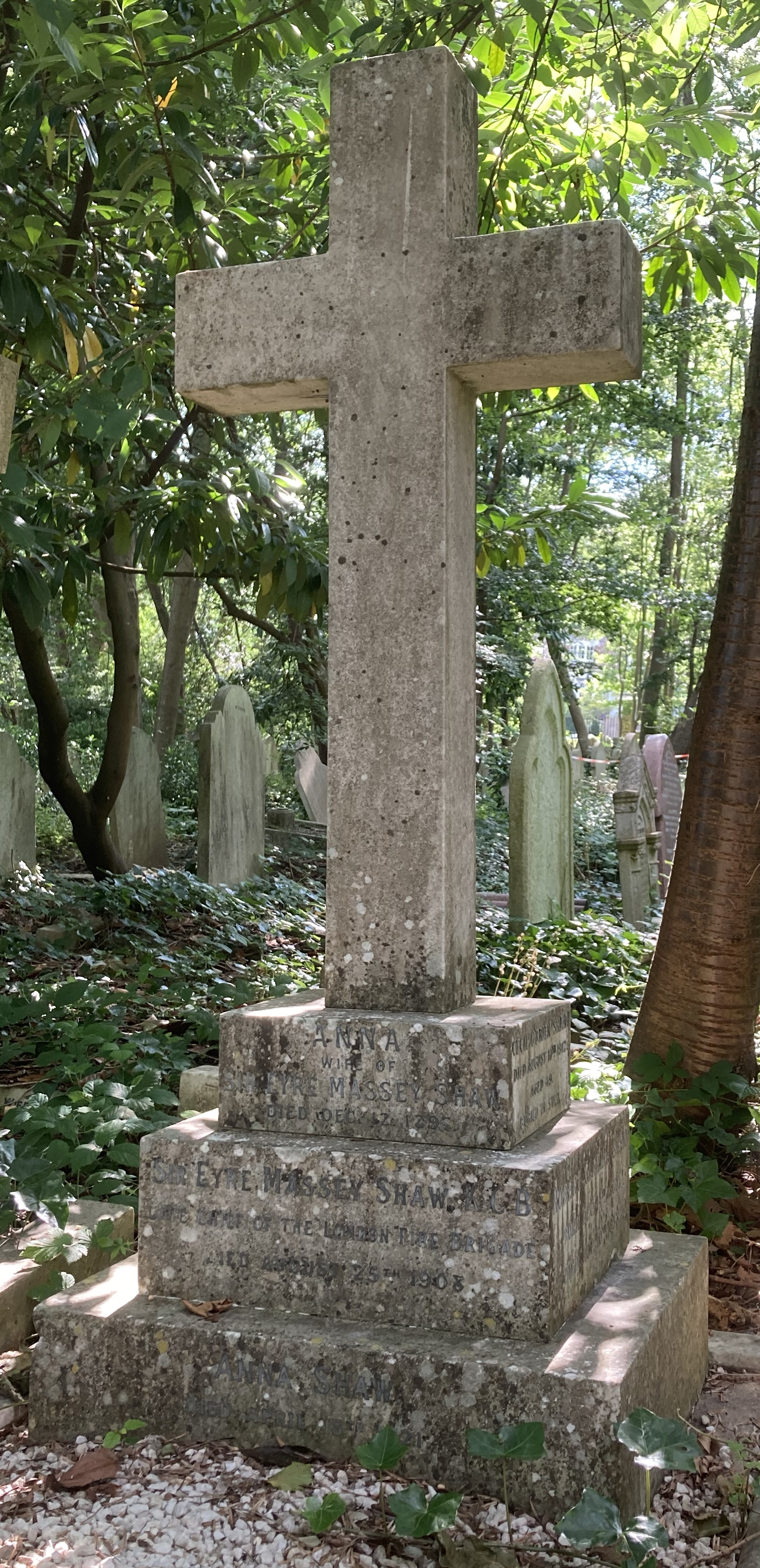
Grave of Eyre Massey Shaw in Highgate Cemetery

In September 1861, the head of London's insurance company fire service, the London Fire Engine Establishment, James Braidwood, was killed in the line of duty while fighting a massive fire in Tooley Street. The position was advertised, and Shaw was engaged, despite having only a little over a year's experience of managing a brigade.

In 1865, Parliament passed the Metropolitan Fire Brigade Act, placing responsibility for fire protection in the Metropolitan Fire Brigade (combining the former London Fire Engine Establishment and the Society for the Protection of Life from Fire), to be supervised by the Metropolitan Board of Works. Shaw headed the new brigade.

Shaw was an influential thinker on firefighting, publishing at least seven books on the subject. He is noted for his introduction of uniforms and the famous brass helmets (c. 1868), and for introducing a ranking system. He also introduced the use of the electrical telegraph for communication between stations (c. 1867), and stand pipes and fire hydrants.

As London grew during the late 19th century, Shaw expanded the number of fire stations. In 1861, the LFEE had comprised 17 land and two river stations and 129 men; when he retired 30 years later, the brigade's estate comprised 55 land and four river stations, 127 street escape and hose-cart stations, 675 personnel and 131 horses. Sloping floors in fire stations allowed engines to move out more easily ('on the run', a term still used today). Under his leadership, he also procured steam fire engines, contacting the main manufacturers, Merryweather & Sons and Shand Mason, and working with them to develop an engine which could be pulled by two horses and produce several jets at high pressure (on average, 300 gallons of water per minute).

When the Fire Brigade was taken over by the London County Council in 1889, he disagreed with the administration and resigned in 1891. He was knighted by Queen Victoria on his last day of service. Shaw died at Folkestone on 25 August 1908 and is buried in the east side of Highgate Cemetery.

=== Following fire service ===
After his resignation from the fire service, Shaw became managing director of the Palatine Insurance Company and chairman of the Metropolitan Electricity Board.

He was later made Deputy Lieutenant of Middlesex.

== Theatre fire safety ==
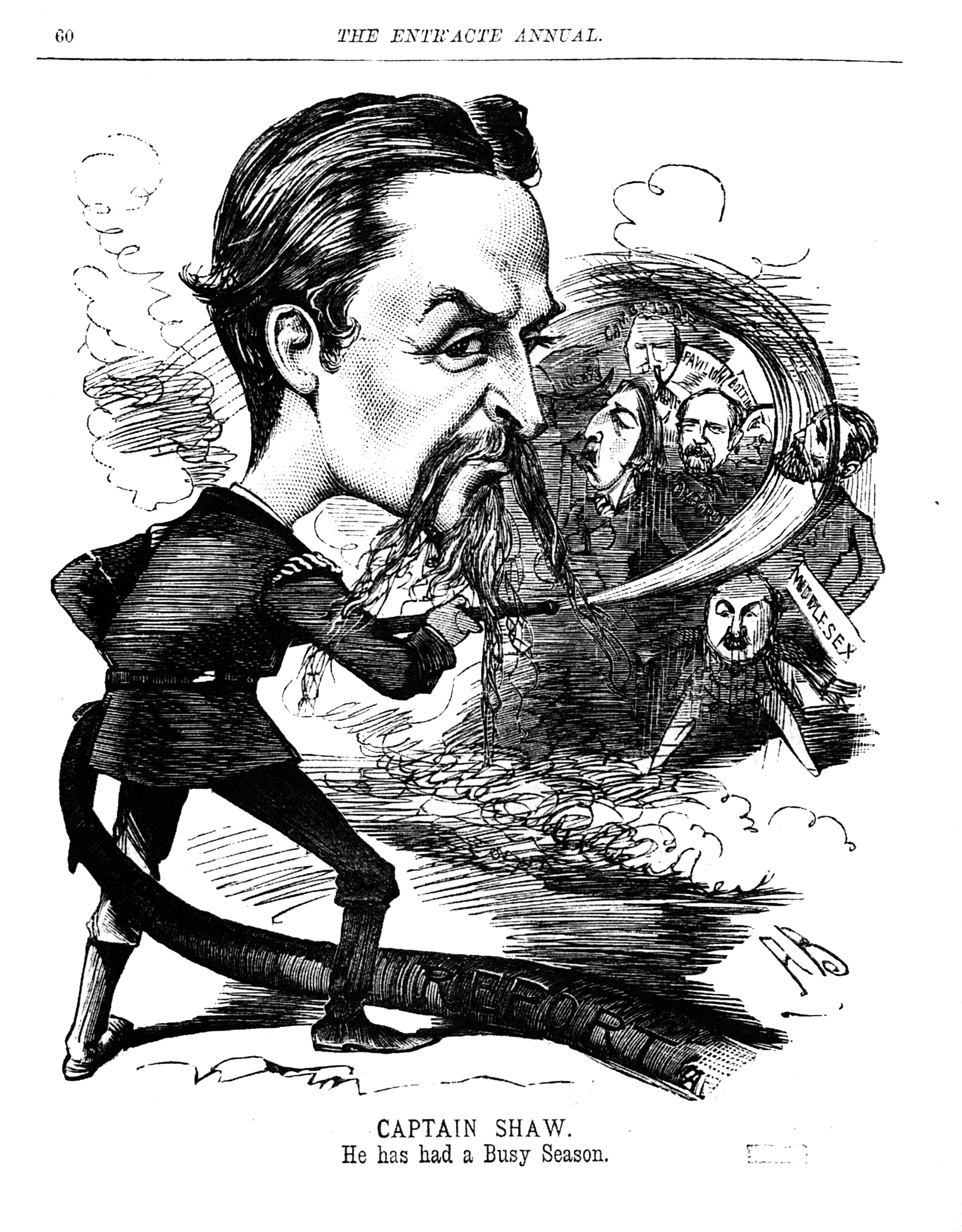
Shaw issues a report into the fire-readiness of the London music halls and theatres

In his work with the Fire Engine Establishment and later the Metropolitan Fire Brigade, Shaw became most concerned with the fire safety of theatres. Theatres were frequent sources of fire, with combustible scenery covered in oil paints near naked flame gas lamps.

Such was his concern, that in 1876, he published the book Fires in Theatres, setting out some of the risks and methods specific to theatres. He was particularly concerned with the lack of regulation and control in the sector.

In 1887, the devastating Exeter Theatre Royal fire claimed the lives of 186 people, and Shaw was appointed to conduct a parliamentary inquiry (with a jury) and to report back. The jury of 21 returned a verdict of accidental death.

Shaw submitted his report to the government on 29 September 1887, and in it he placed the blame firmly with the architect, Phipps. Phipps defended himself from the blame, deflecting to the fact that a number of changes had been made during construction from the designs that he proposed.

This proved to be the catalyst for action, and gradually regulations were tightened.

== Published works ==
Shaw published a number of books:

- Fires and Fire Brigades
- Fire Protection: A complete manual
- Fire Surveys: A summary of the principles to be observed in estimating the risk of buildings
- Instructions for the use and management of Fire escapes and the rescue of life from fire

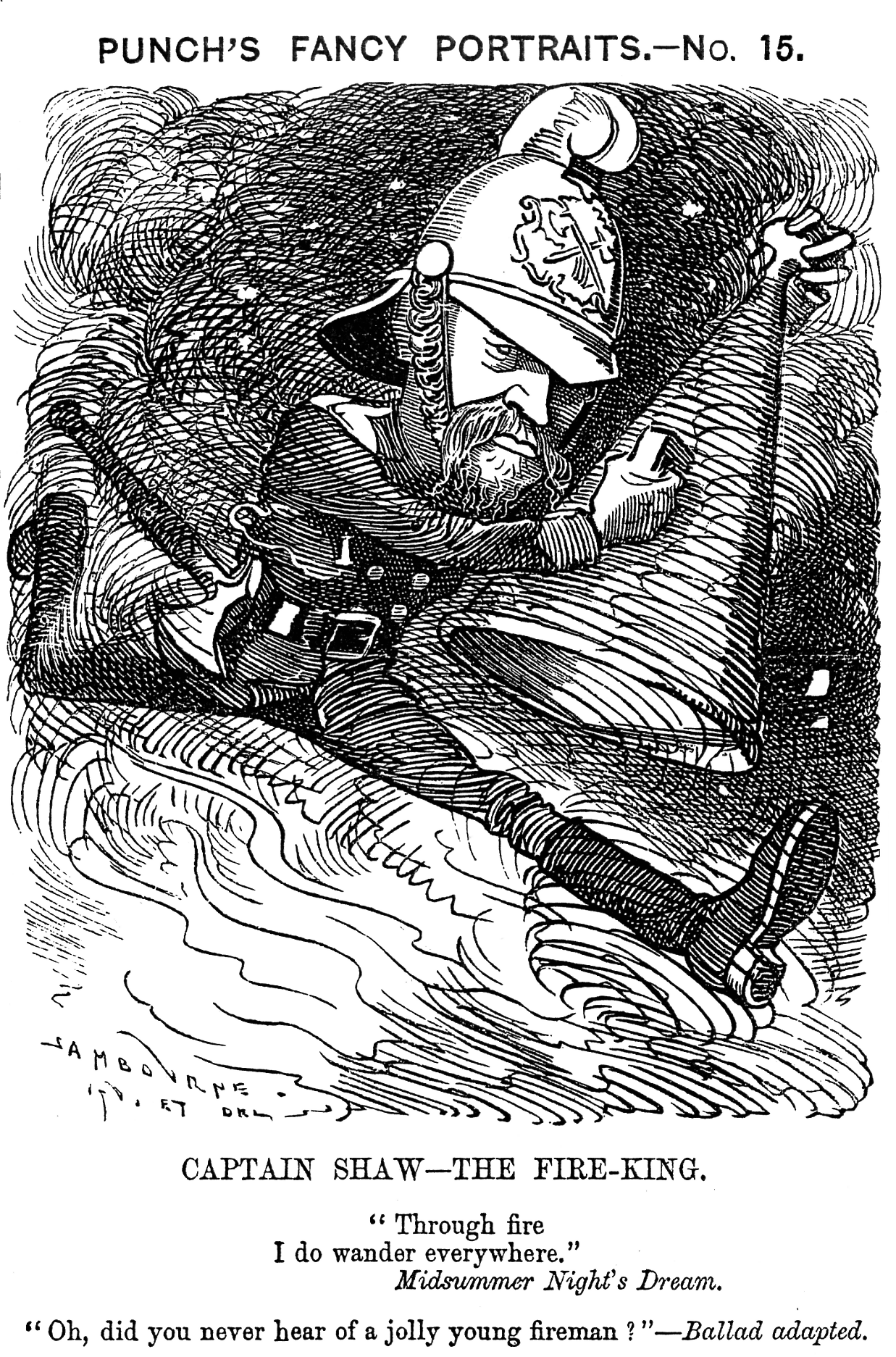
In Punch

- Instructions concerning Branches and Nozzles
- Fire in Theatres
- Instructions concerning air and water

== Cultural influence and legacy ==
Shaw was a well-known socialite and a personal friend of the Prince of Wales (later Edward VII). A firefighting outfit was always kept ready at Charing Cross Fire Station in case the Royal heir chose to firefight.

Shaw is best remembered today as the "Captain Shaw" to whom the Fairy Queen in Gilbert and Sullivan's Iolanthe addresses herself, " … In that we gain/A Captain Shaw!/(Aside.)Oh, Captain Shaw!/Type of true love kept under!/Could thy Brigade/With cold cascade/Quench my great love, I wonder!" a reference to Shaw's popularity with certain aristocratic ladies of the town. Shaw was present in the stalls at the first night of Iolanthe in 1882, and Alice Barnett, playing the Fairy Queen, addressed herself directly to him. Legend has it that he stood up and took a bow. In 1886 Shaw was named in an adultery lawsuit involving Lady Colin Campbell who was sitting next to Shaw at the Iolanthe premiere.

In conjunction with professor John Tyndall of the Royal Society, Shaw designed a fire respirator for the use of his firefighters.

The London brigade's 1935 fireboat was named Massey Shaw in his honour.

Winchester House, the headquarters of the Metropolitan Fire brigade in Southwark, which also included a residence for Shaw, later became the London Fire Brigade Museum (now closed); an English Heritage Blue plaque still adorns the building and states that Shaw lived there.
