= Londonderry Borough Police =

- Common name: Horney Dicks
- Abbreviation: LBP

Agency overview
- Formed: 1848
- Preceding agency: Londonderry Corporation Policing Committee
- Dissolved: 1870
- Superseding agency: Royal Irish Constabulary
- Employees: 38
- Legal personality: Governmental: Government-owned corporation

Jurisdictional structure
- Operations jurisdiction: Londonderry, UK
- Legal jurisdiction: Borough of Londonderry
- Primary governing body: British government
- Secondary governing body: Londonderry Corporation
- Constituting instrument: Londonderry Improvement Act 1848
- General nature: Local civilian police

The Londonderry Borough Police was the police force in the city of Derry, County Londonderry, Ireland, from 1848 to 1870, nicknamed the Horney Dicks after the bones used in their helmets. They replaced the earlier town watch and were in turn replaced by the Royal Irish Constabulary (RIC). The police force was established by the Londonderry Improvement Act 1848 and were governed by the Londonderry Corporation. Its abolition was recommended by a royal commission of inquiry into sectarian riots in the city in 1869. The commission felt the force, having the form of a town watch, was inadequate to policing serious crime; it also noted, but did not endorse, allegations that the police discriminated against Roman Catholics.

== History ==
Historically, policing in Ireland had been carried out by a town watch. By the 1830s in County Londonderry, the watch was posted so irregularly that citizens resorted to manning the watch themselves or hiring their own night watchmen. In 1832, the Londonderry Corporation created a Policing Committee of thirteen constables, but this was later deemed inadequate as the city expanded beyond the committee's capacity. In 1848, the Parliament of the United Kingdom of Great Britain and Ireland passed a private bill, the Londonderry Improvement Act 1848 (11 & 12 Vict. c. cxli), which granted the Londonderry Corporation the power to raise its own police force. This initially consisted of one inspector, one chief constable, one corporal and thirteen constables. Gradually policing in Ireland was centralised under the Royal Irish Constabulary (RIC) except for the Londonderry Borough Police, Belfast Borough Police and the Dublin Metropolitan Police (DMP), which each retained their independence due to their statutory status.

== Disbanding ==
On 28 April 1869, Prince Arthur (later created Duke of Connaught and Strathearn) visited Derry, where a Catholic reportedly waved a flag bearing a harp with no crown and shouted for an "Irish Republic". Members of the Protestant Apprentice Boys of Derry were angered by this, considering it a deliberate insult to the monarchy. In a sectarian riot that evening, three of the Apprentice Boys were shot dead by Londonderry Borough Police constables. A subsequent Commission of Inquiry ordered by the Lord Lieutenant of Ireland found that the Londonderry Borough Police were inadequate to their task: it had only 38 officers and, being majority-Protestant, was distrusted by Catholics. The inquiry made the recommendation to "substitute it for a more efficient force".

The Constabulary (Ireland) Amendment Act 1870 was passed which abolished the Londonderry Borough Police and passed the responsibility of policing in the borough to the Royal Irish Constabulary (RIC). The area previously policed by the Londonderry Borough Police would become a separate police district of the RIC and provided that there would be 45 police constables in addition to the 38 from the Londonderry Borough Police. Following the passage of the act, the Londonderry Corporation lost its power to appoint constables but was still responsible for paying for the former Londonderry Borough Police officers' pensions. The corporation requested that the RIC honour the service of the former Londonderry Borough Police constables who were transferred, but this was refused, with the RIC stating they were going to hire 50% Protestant and 50% Catholic for the district. In response, the Londonderry Corporation refused to help fund a female searcher or hand over the former police force's records, citing the 1870 act stating they were not obliged "to make any payments for Constabulary purposes other than the moiety of the Constables pay to be charged as mentioned in the statute".
