= Shand Mason =

British manufacturer of steam-powered fire engines

Shand Mason & Co.
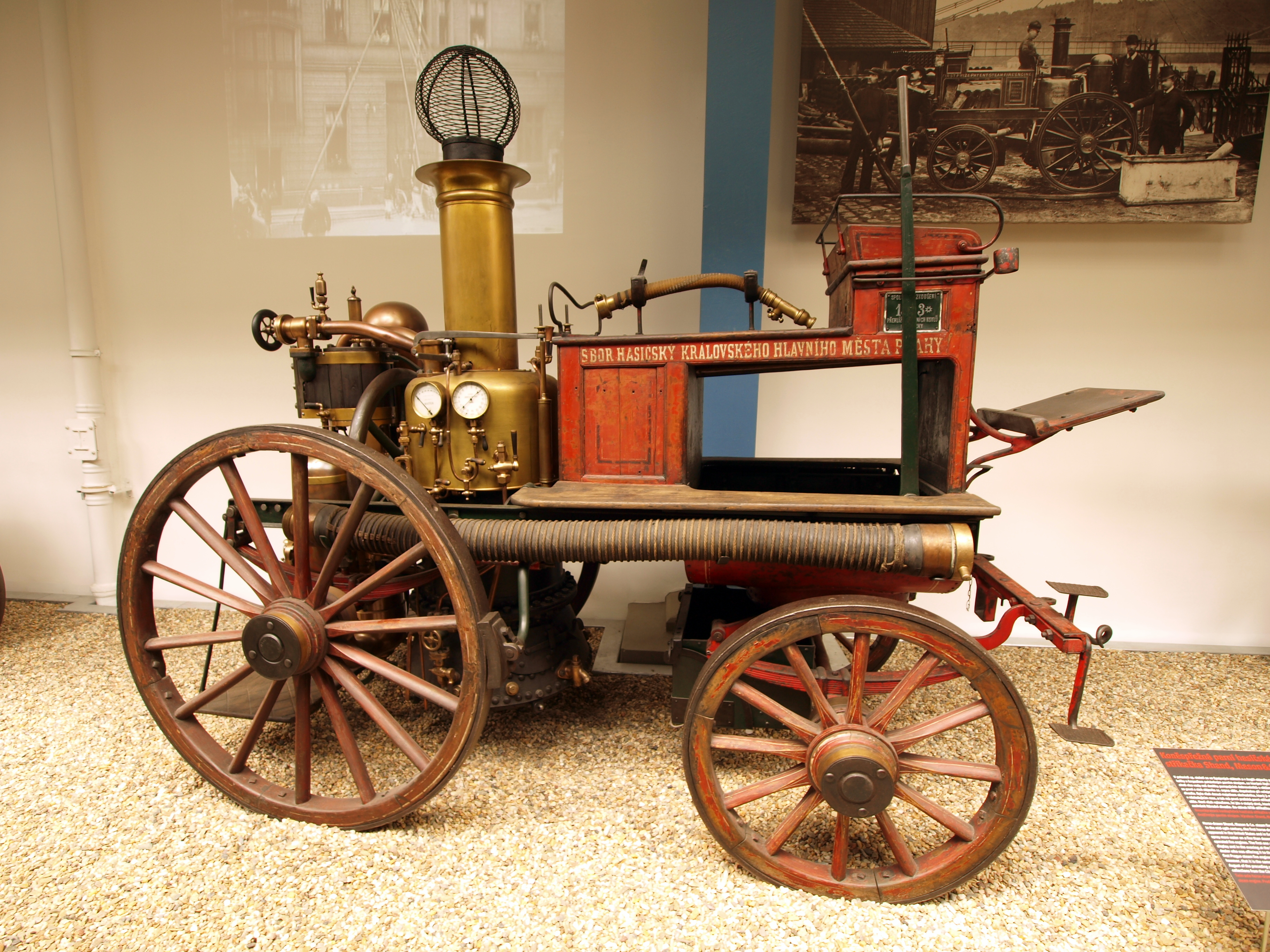
- 1882 Shand Mason fire engine
- Type: Manufacturer
- Industry: Fire engines
- Founded: 1760; 266 years ago in Lambeth, England
- Defunct: 1928
- Fate: Taken over
- Successor: Merryweather & Sons
- Key people: James Shand, Samuel Mason

Shand Mason was a British company which designed and manufactured steam powered fire engines and other fire-fighting equipment during the 19th century and early 20th centuries.

== History ==
The company that eventually became Shand Mason was founded in 1760 by Samuel Phillips, and incorporated as Phillips and Hopwood in 1797. In 1818, after William Joshua Tilley had joined the business, it became Hopwood and Tilley and later Tilley & Co. In 1850, when Tilley retired from the business, his two sons-in-law James Shand and Samuel Mason continued the business as Shand and Mason, later Shand Mason & Co.

The company operated from premises at 75 Upper Ground Street, Lambeth, just south of the River Thames in London, and having initially manufactured manually operated pumps, secured various patents to improve the design and construction of steam fire engines.

While the first steam-powered fire engine had been developed by John Braithwaite and John Ericsson in 1829, the first commercially successful fire-engine was a water-borne version developed by Shand Mason & Co, which went into service in 1855. From this point and particularly from the 1860s, the company worked with the chief of the Metropolitan Fire Brigade, Eyre Massey Shaw, and with competitor Merryweather & Sons, to perfect designs for land-based use by the London brigade and other municipalities. Its first land-based engine used by the brigade was produced in 1860.

Its engines were initially horse-drawn, but later installed on fireboats (Europe's first, the Fire Queen was built by Shand Mason for service in Bristol's docks in the 1880s), and mounted on motor vehicles. The business was eventually taken over by Merryweather & Sons in 1928.

== Gallery ==
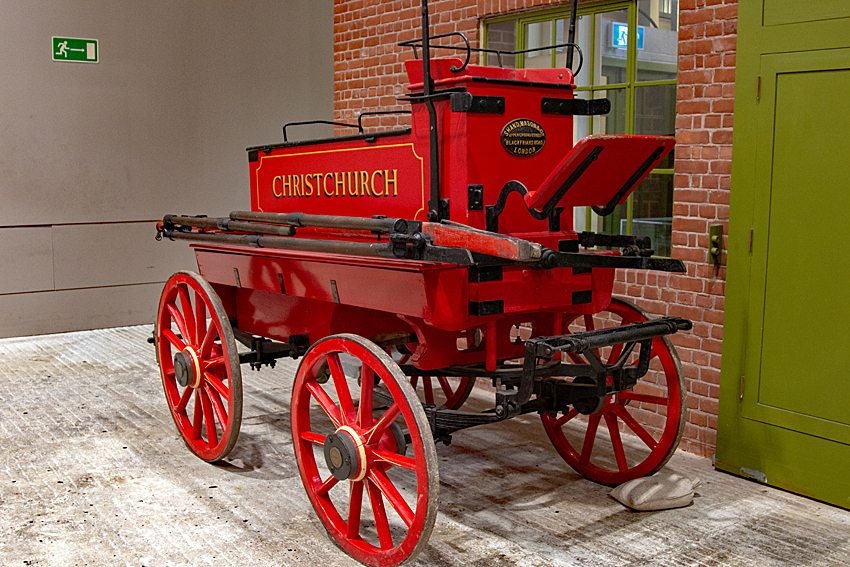
Shand Mason hand pump

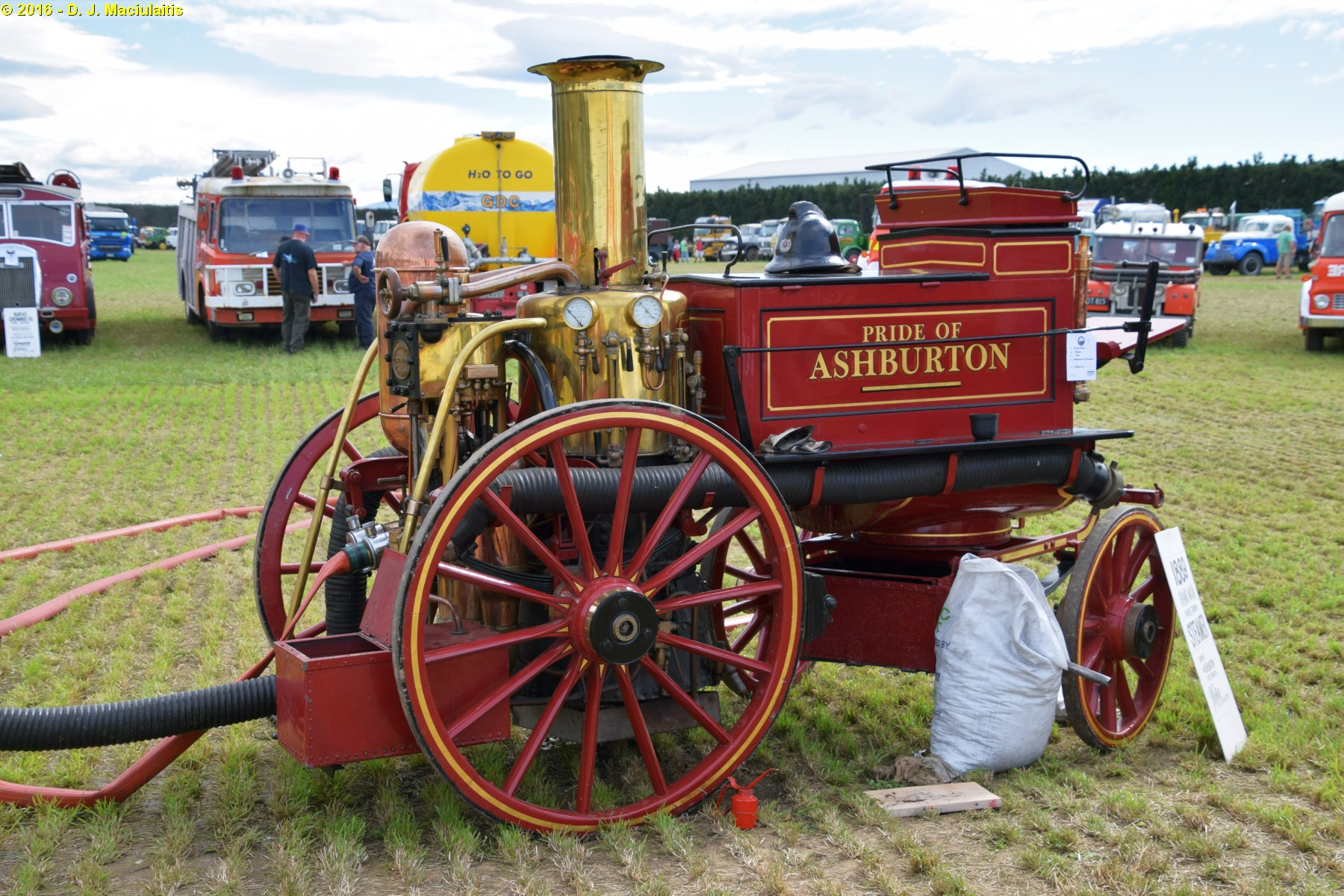
1889 steam pump, Pride of Ashburton
