= Ballymore, County Cork =

Village in Cork Harbour, Ireland

Ballymore An Baile Mór
- Village
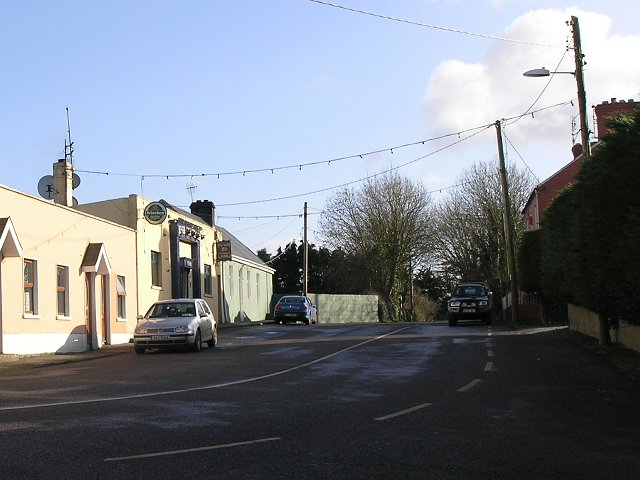
- Ballymore village centre

- Location in Ireland
- Coordinates: 51°51′58″N 8°14′20″W
- Country: Ireland
- Province: Munster
- County: County Cork
- Time zone: UTC+0 (WET)
  - Summer (DST): UTC-1 (IST (WEST))

Ballymore (Irish: An Baile Mór, meaning 'the big town') is a small village on the Great Island in Cork Harbour, approximately 4 km (2.5 mi) from the town of Cobh and 23 km (14 mi) from Cork near the south coast of Ireland.

Ballymore is the closest village to the centre of the island and is situated on the oldest and longest road on the island.

Near Ballymore is the old cemetery of Templerobin where once stood an ancient church, one of three which may have been built on the island as early as the 9th century. According to Great Island Tours, a book published by the local library, Templerobin is mentioned in records dated 1302 and 1652 but by 1774 it was reported as being in ruins.

Ballymore has a small Roman Catholic church and is served by the school of the adjoining twin village of Walterstown, the two being townlands which jointly make up the village of Ballymore. The area is historically associated with the Barry family, a powerful Norman era family which is still represented in the area today.

Sports clubs in the area include Ballymore Athletic, where Sonia O'Sullivan, the 1995 World Championships in Athletics gold medalist in the 5,000m race, trained from an early age. There is also a local cycling club and the area hosts an annual cycle race.

There is a single public house in the village, known as the Hi Chapperal. There was previously a post office in Ballymore but this has now been downgraded to a postal agency.

== See also ==
- List of towns and villages in Ireland
