= Merryweather & Sons =

UK manufacture

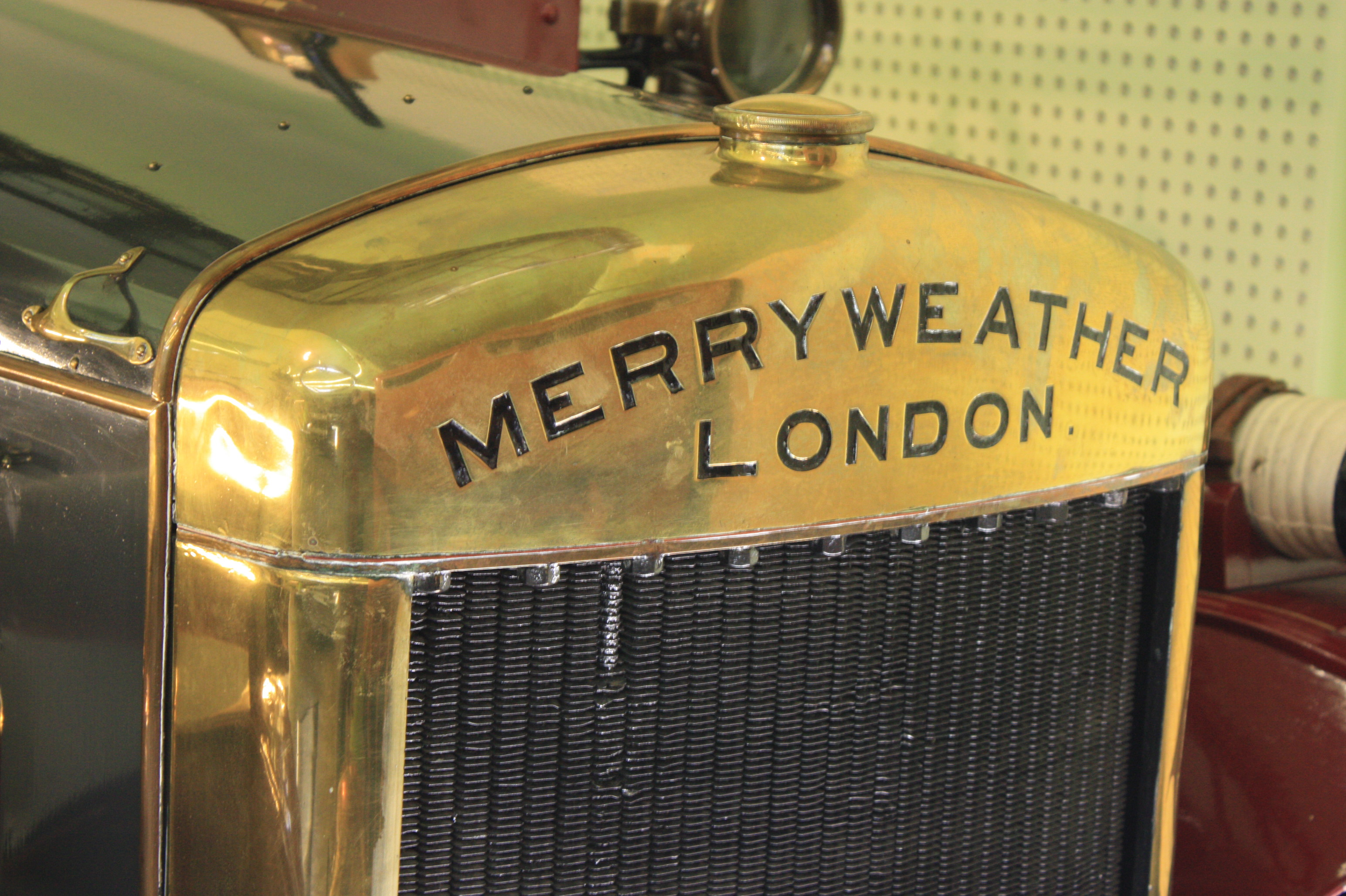
Merryweather radiator.

Merryweather & Sons of Clapham, later Greenwich, London, were builders of steam fire engines and steam tram engines.

The founder was Moses Merryweather (1791–1872) of Clapham, who was joined by his son Richard Moses (1839–1877).

== Fire appliances ==
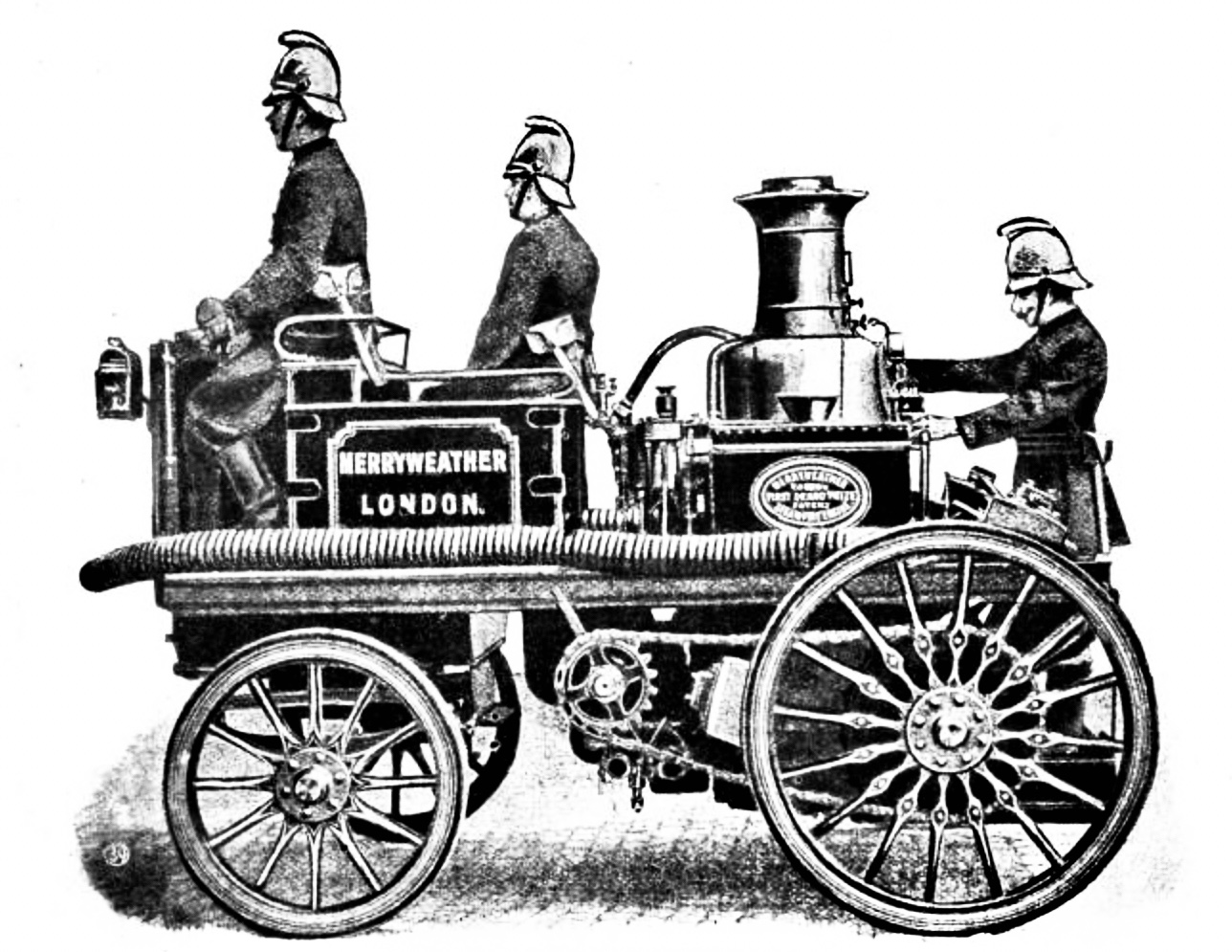
Merryweather & Sons (1900)

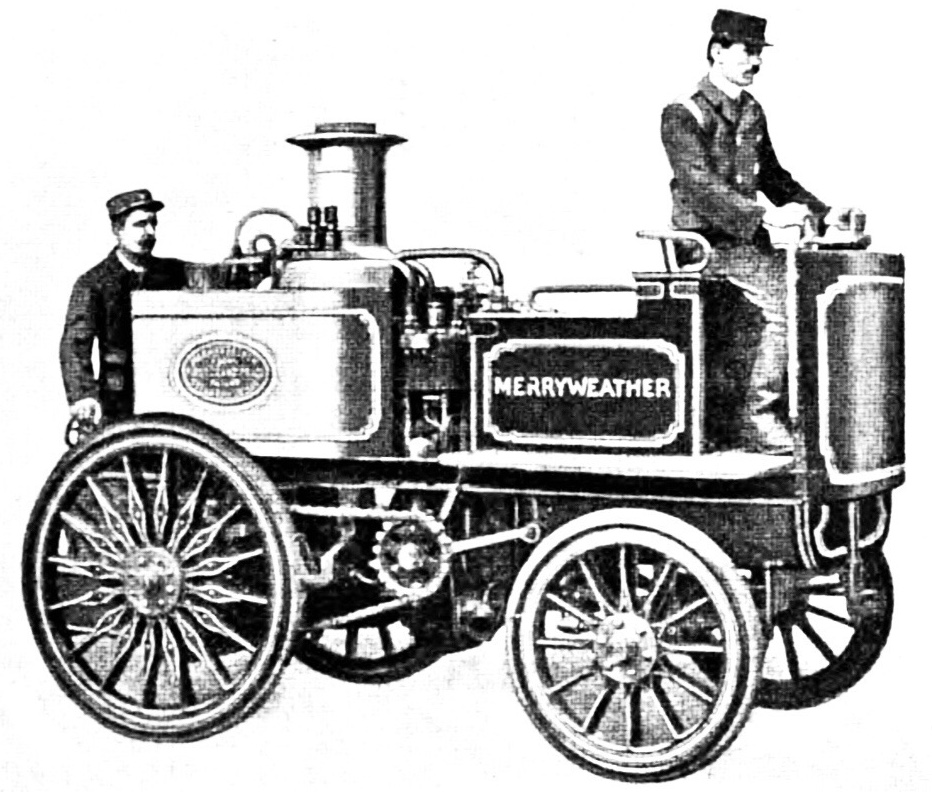
Merryweather & Sons (1902)

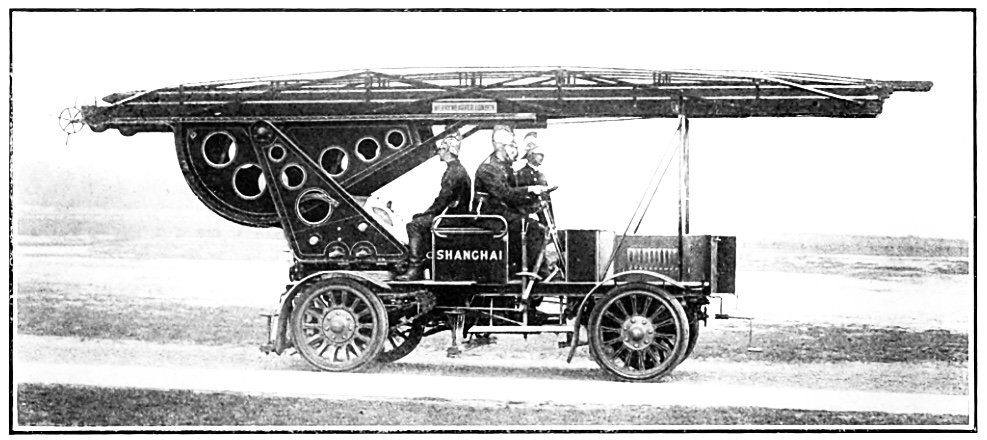
Merryweather & Sons (1909)

Merryweather & Sons (1910)

Merryweather 24-30 hp (1910)

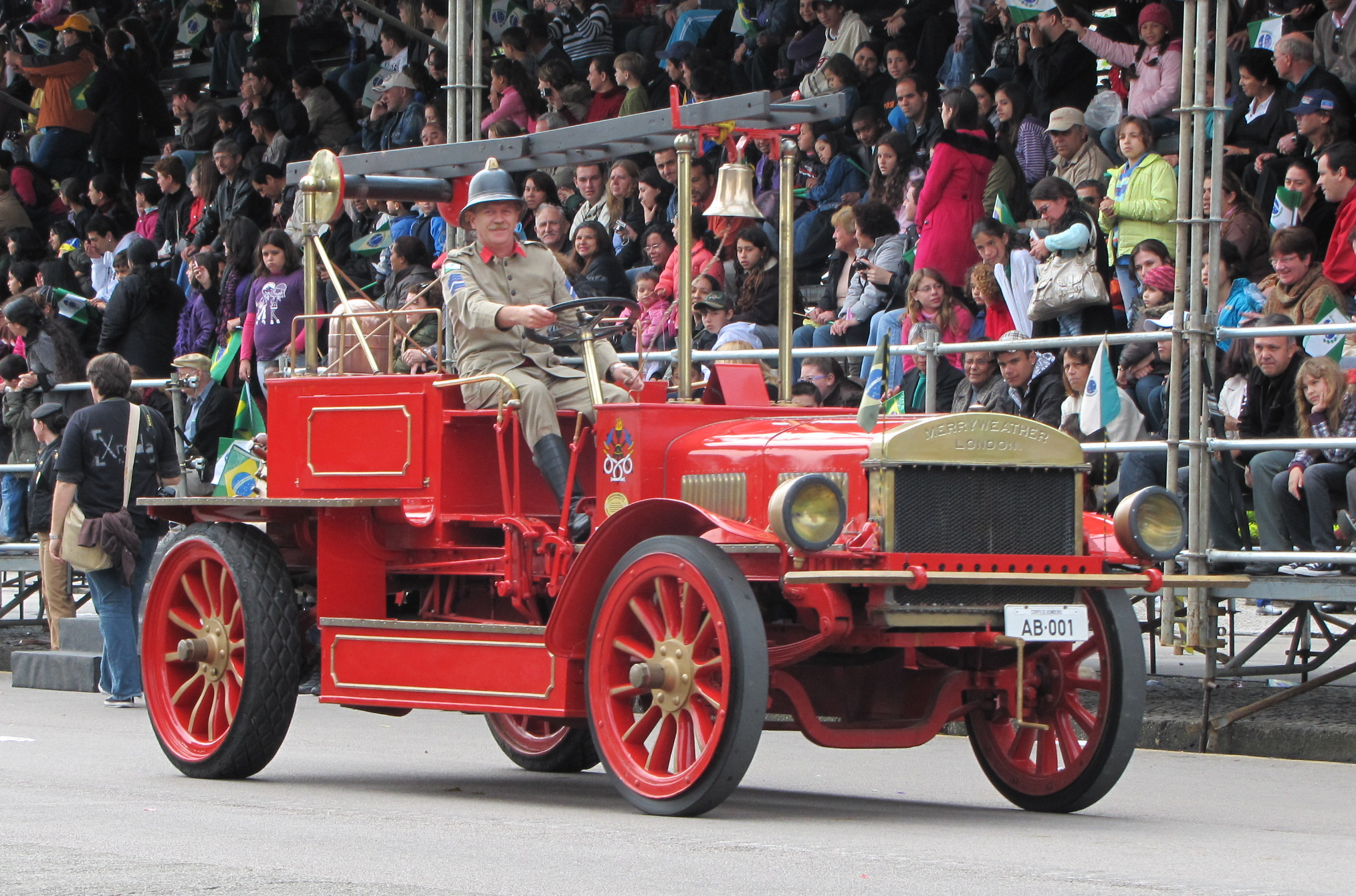
1912 Merryweather of Firefighters Corps of Paraná State, Brazil.

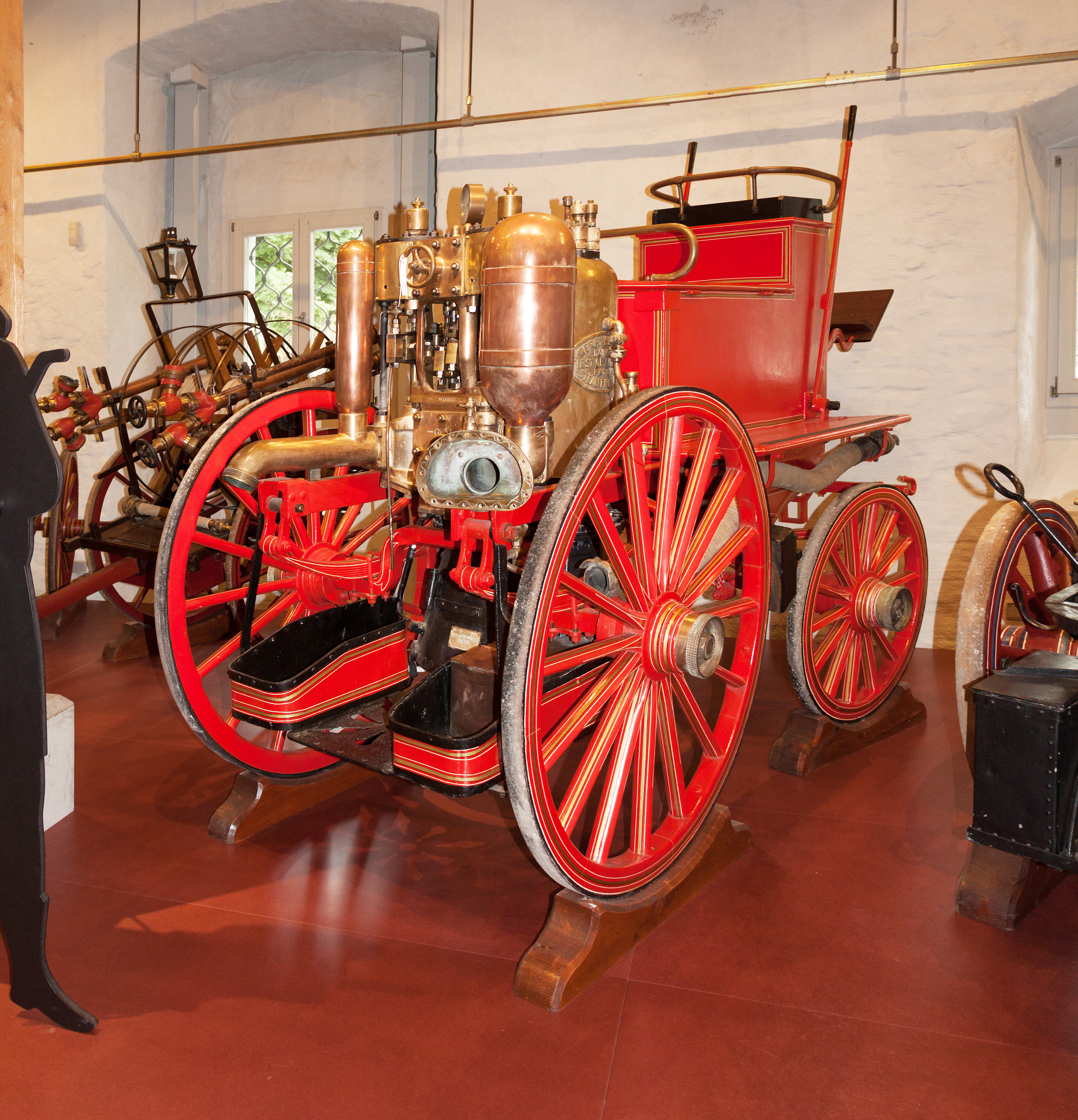
Steam fire engine The Gem Pat. (1896).

The Merryweathers worked with the engineer Edward Field to fit his design of a vertical boiler onto a horse-drawn platform. They successfully applied it for use in their steam fire engine, thus improving water pressure and making easier to use once steam had been got up. It was reckoned that an engine could get up enough pressure to pump within ten minutes of a call out; the fire could be started before leaving the fire station so there would be enough pressure by the time they arrived at the scene of the fire.

Appliances were available in small sizes suitable for a country house, pumping about 100 gallons per minute, through to large dockyard models, rated at 2000 gallons per minute. A common size, popular with Borough fire brigades, was the double vertical boiler, that could pump between 250 and 450 gallons per minute. Merryweather also provided hydrants and mains water supplies for highly vulnerable sites such as theatres, where getting a strong enough supply of water could be a problem.

Dock fires were a particular problem, as the hand-operated appliances of the time had neither the reach nor the power to tackle a blaze on a boat or their large warehouses. After successfully demonstrating the improvement of the steam-powered devices fighting petroleum fires at Antwerp docks, Merryweather's appliances, with their distinctive crews wearing Merryweather helmets, soon became synonymous with firefighting in Britain and abroad, alongside their rivals Shand, Mason. Merryweather also built specialist fireboats, such as a steam-powered fire-fighting barge for the port of Alexandria, designed to pump 1,200 gallons per minute to a height of 200 feet.

In 1899, Merryweather produced the world's first successful self-propelled steam fire engine, the 'Fire King'; the first was dispatched to Port Louis on Mauritius. The first motorised fire engine in London was a Merryweather appliance delivered to the Finchley Fire Brigade in 1904. It was commemorated in April 1974 by the issue of a 3.5 pence Royal Mail postage stamp. The actual vehicle is preserved in the reserve collection of the Science Museum at Wroughton in Wiltshire. Another notable survivor is the UK's oldest known aerodrome fire/crash tender, a 1937 Merryweather with a Commer engine and chassis, now preserved in running order at Brooklands Museum in Surrey.

In the end of 1909 the Brihanmumbai Municipal Corporation the municipality of Bombay acquired a Hatfield Motor Vehicle Company based fire engine from Merryweather & Sons powered by a 50hp engine capable to achieve top speed of 30 miles per hour on solid rubber tires and had a capacity to deliver 450 gallons of water in a minute. With the fire tender, the governing body also acquired an escape tender which was also from Merryweather & Sons which featured a 50ft sliding carriage and was powered by a petrol engine.

== Tram engines ==
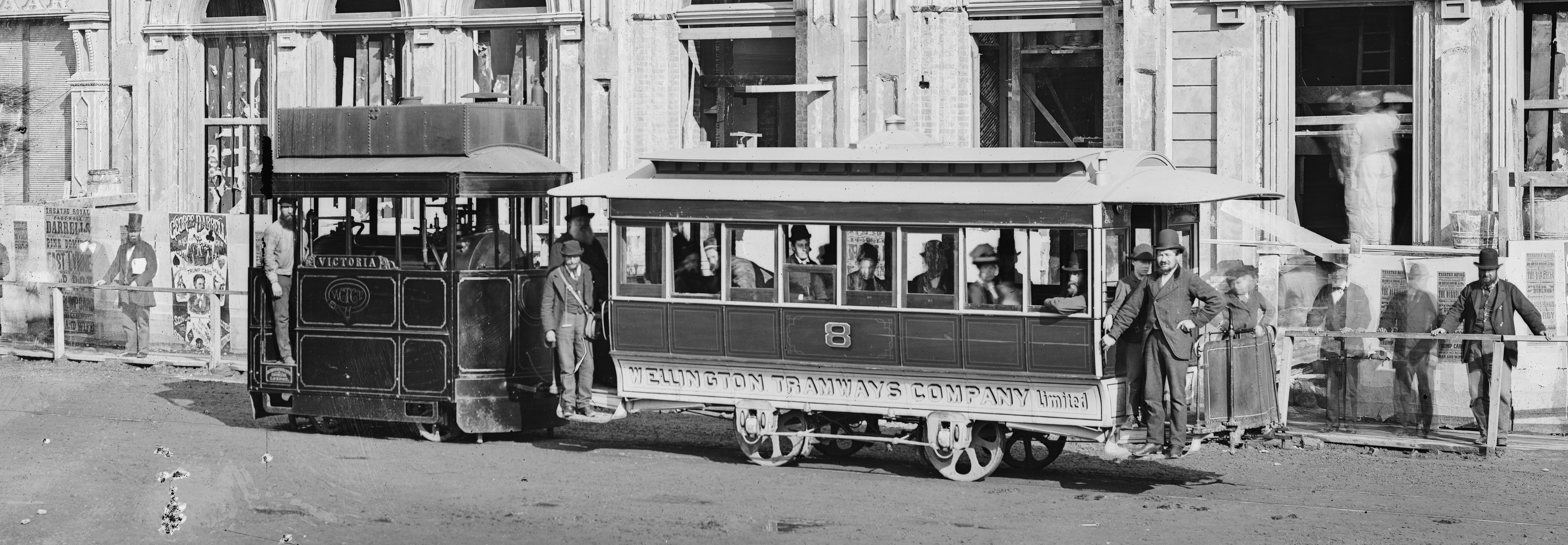
Wellington tramways locomotive Victoria, New Zealand 1879.

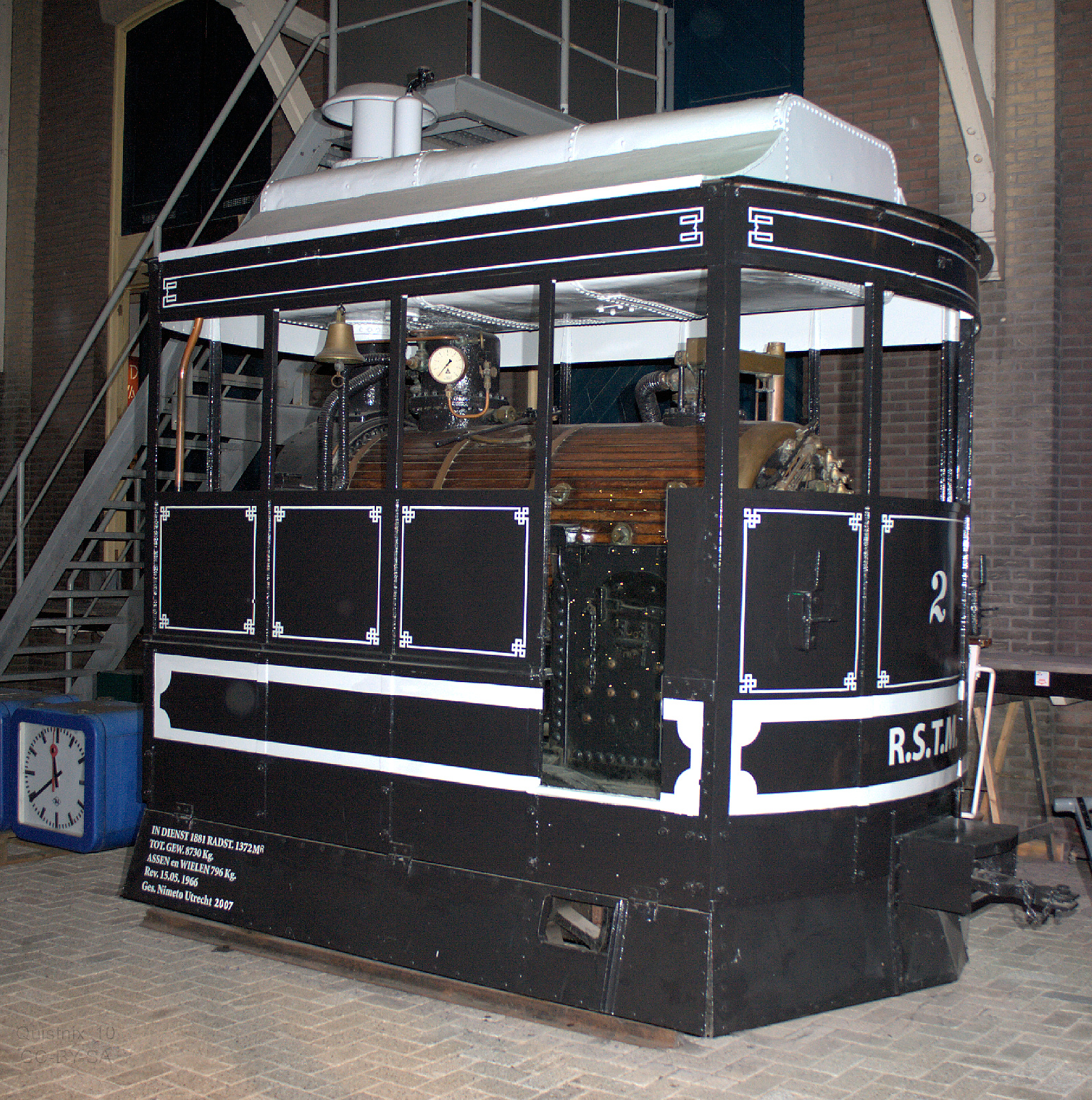
An 1881 Merryweather steam tram in the Dutch Railway Museum.

Merryweather supplied the steam machinery for John Grantham's steam tramcar in 1873. Between 1875 and 1892 the factory produced about 174 steam tram engines, of which 41 were used in Britain, 46 in Paris, 6 in Kassel, Germany, 15 to Barcelona, 15 in the Netherlands, 11 in New Zealand and 15 in Rangoon. 6 engines of 1881 went to the Stockton and Darlington Steam Tramway Company. One was used experimentally on the steam tramway in Sydney (1881).

An example of a Merryweather tram engine is preserved in the Dutch Railway Museum at Utrecht, RSTM 2, built in 1881 (or 5?, built in 1882?).

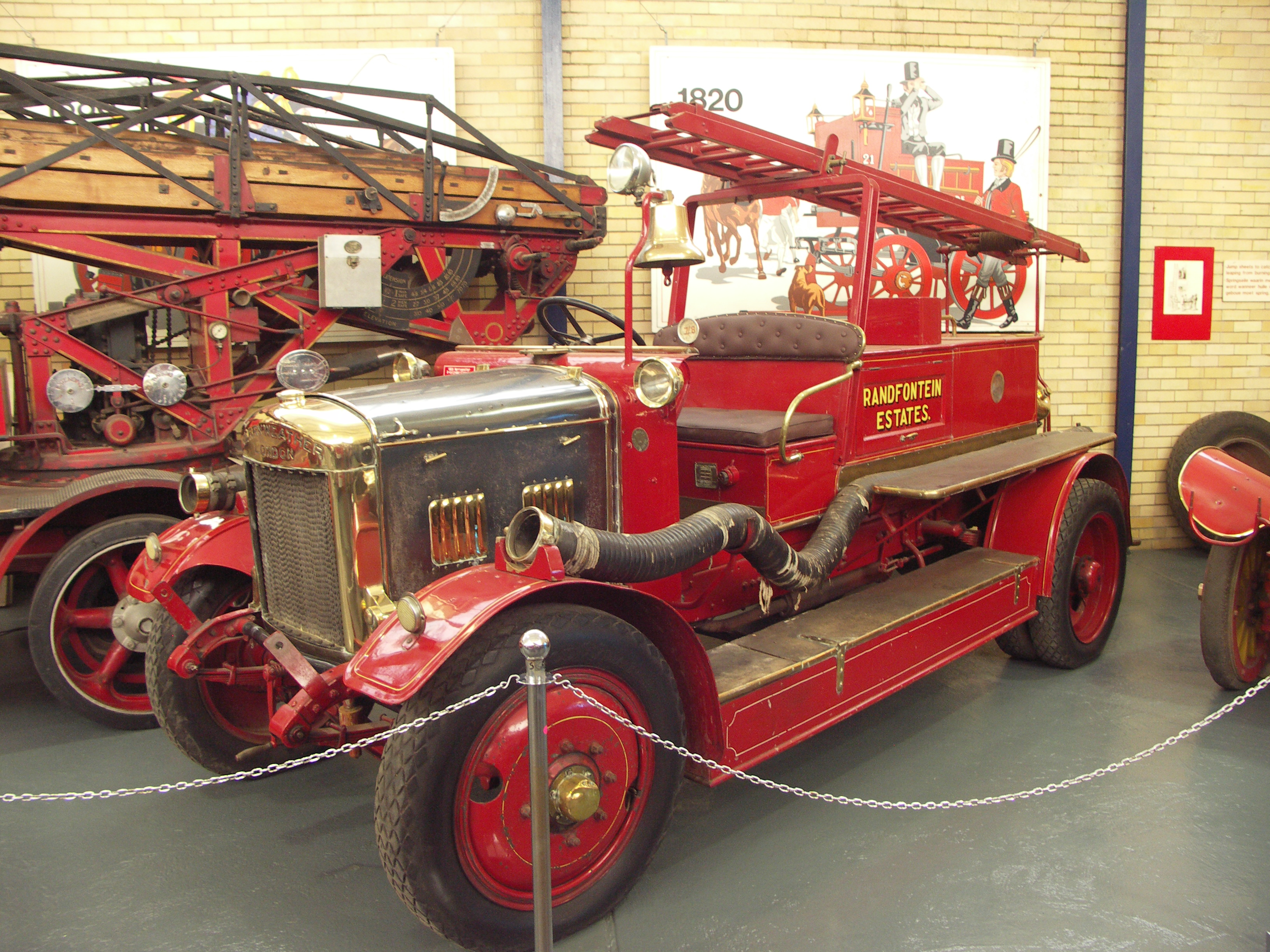
1924 Merryweather 3 cylinder circular pump unit, South Africa.

== Fire helmets ==
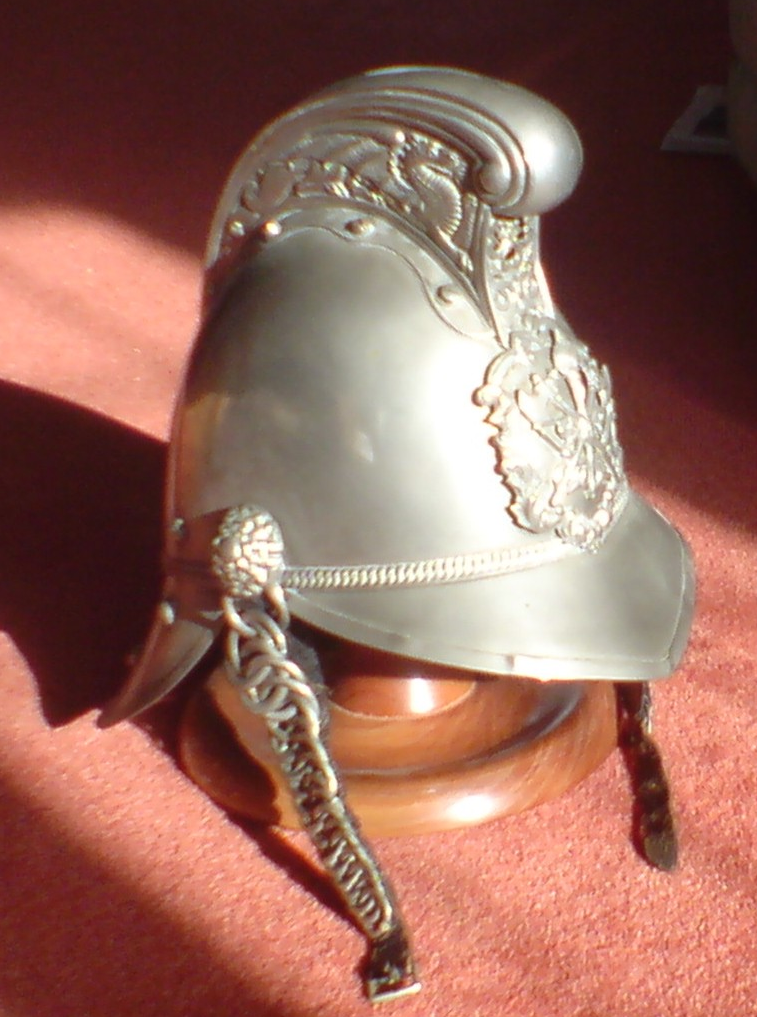
Merryweather helmet

In the 19th century and early 20th century, Merryweather & Sons produced firefighters' helmets based on a type that had been used in Paris.

== Other products ==
At the 1904 Royal Horticultural Society Show in London, Merryweather received a gold medal for a range of petrol motor driven plant including :

- A compact 12 hp motor driven centrifugal pump for irrigation purposes (300 gallons per minute)
- A small hop washing plant driven by a 2 hp 'bicycle' motor
- A general purpose estate pump using an 8 hp motor, and three throw Hatfield pump

An unusual Merryweather product was a five-ton moveable wall for the Royal College of Physicians.

== Sources ==
- History of the Steam Tram by H. A. Whitcombe, published by the Oakwood Press in 1961
- A History of the British Steam Tram, Volume 1, by David Gladwin, published by Adam Gordon in 2004: pages 78–86
- Tramway Lokomotiven by Walter Hefti, published by Birkhauser Verlag in 1980: pages 113–116
- The House of Merryweather: A Record of Two Centuries, Merryweather & Sons Ltd (attributed to James Compton Merryweather), published by Merritt & Hatcher Ltd, 1901

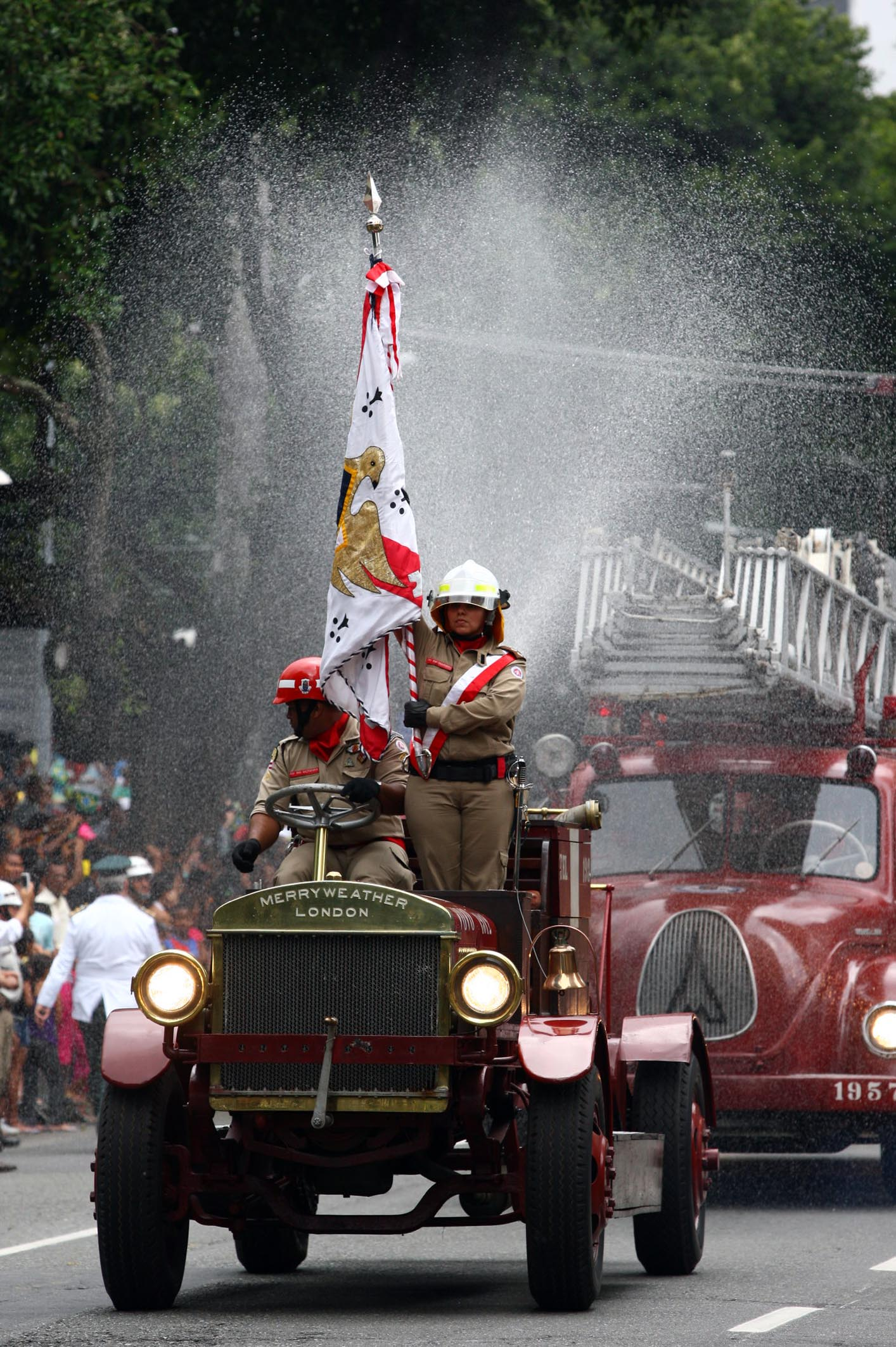
Merryweather of Military Firefighters Corps of Bahia State, Brazil.
