= Belfast Borough Police =

Police force for Belfast from 1800 to 1865

The Belfast Borough Police was the police force for Belfast from 1800 to 1865, when it was abolished and replaced by the Royal Irish Constabulary (RIC). Its members, nicknamed the Bulkies, had authority within the Belfast Police District.

== History ==
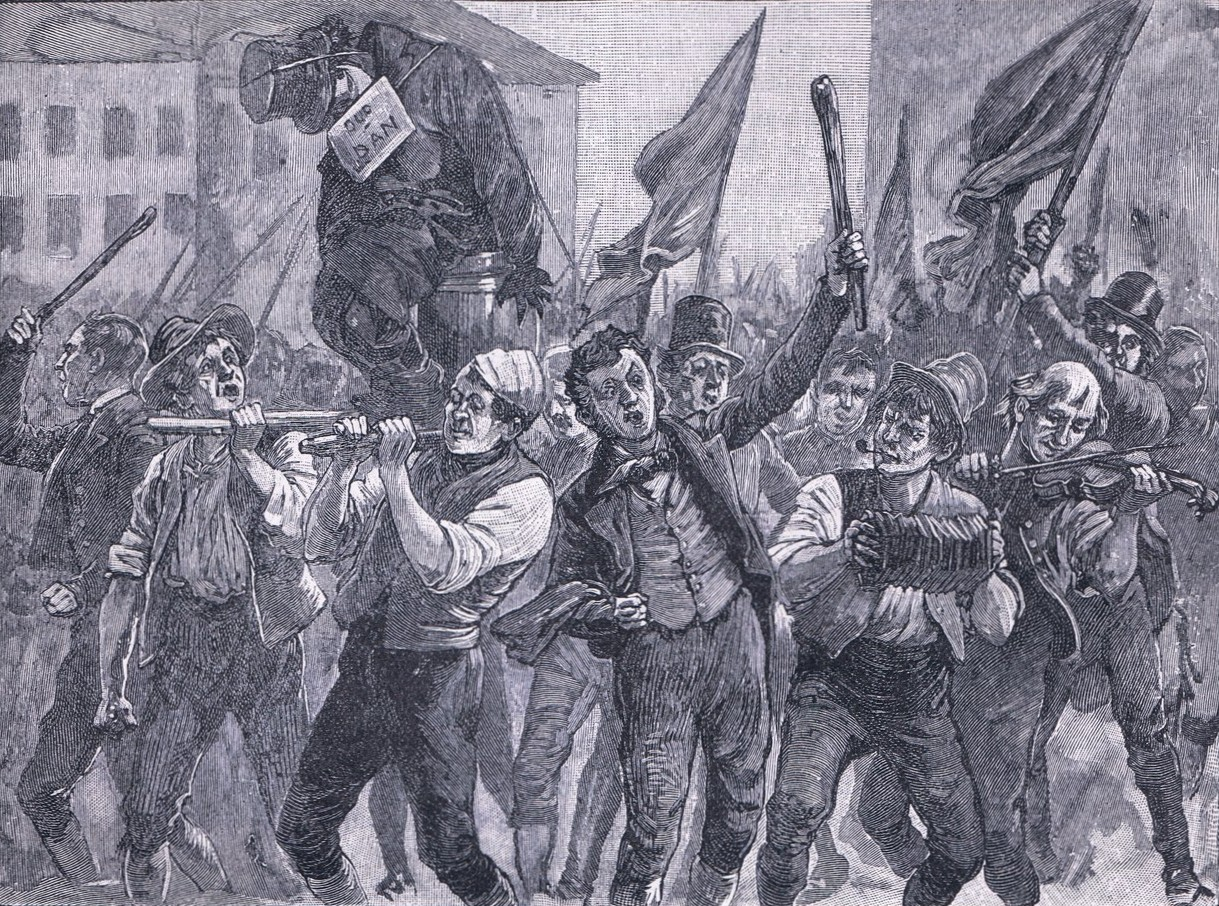
Protestant demonstrators burning an effigy of Daniel O’Connell, an incident that sparked the Belfast riots of 1864

A town watch was authorised under several acts of the Parliament of Ireland, the last, the Belfast Improvement Act 1800 (40 Geo. 3. c. 37 (I)), which also established town commissioners for lighting and paving. (Note: 40 Geo. 3 (I). c. 37 (I)) The police and commissioners gained greater powers in 1816 under a local act of the UK Parliament, the Belfast Improvement Act 1816 (56 Geo. 3. c. lvii). (Note: 56 Geo. 3. c. lvii) The police area of jurisdiction, whose residents were liable for the police tax to fund the force, was not defined in the 1816 act; at first the police area was taken to be the same as the lighting and paving area, but later it was extended. The parliamentary borough and municipal borough had differing limits again. By the time the force was abolished, its jurisdiction remained confined to County Antrim, excluding Ballymacarrett, the County Down portion of the borough of Belfast. It then had 160 men. The RIC had 70 men stationed in Belfast at the beginning of the August 1864 riots, with 800 reinforcements arriving over the next two weeks.

By the 1800 act, the police commissioners were the thirteen members of the municipal corporation together with twelve town commissioners for lighting and paving. Although the borough sovereign was authorised to act as police magistrate, in 1816 he appointed a substitute at a salary of £200 per annum, which the 1835 municipal corporation commission considered one of several abuses concerning the police. After the Municipal Corporations (Ireland) Act 1840 reformed the corporation, the Belfast Improvement Act 1845 (8 & 9 Vict. c. cxlii) replaced the 1800 and 1816 acts.

Most of the Belfast Borough Police force were Protestants, and many local Roman Catholics regarded it as sectarian. An 1864 royal commission of inquiry examined the Belfast magistrate and police district, after serious communal rioting that year. The commission noted that most of the senior members of the force were members of the Orange Order and recommended abolishing the force, which was effected by the Constabulary (Ireland) Amendment Act 1865 (28 & 29 Vict. c. 70).

== See also ==
- Dublin Metropolitan Police (1836–1925)
- Londonderry Borough Police (1848–1869)
