= Sir Ralph Abercromby (pub) =

Pub in Manchester, England

The Sir Ralph Abercromby
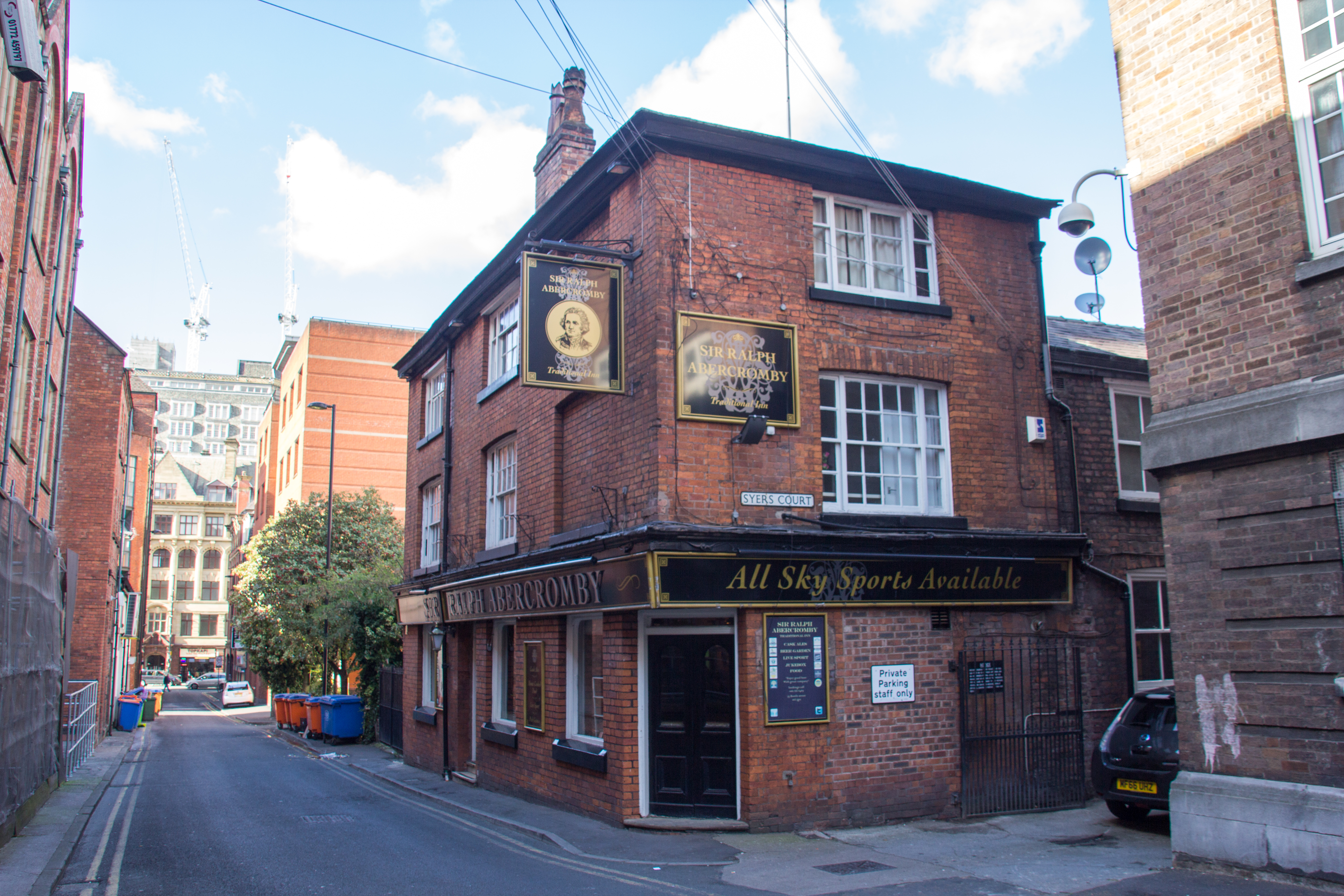
- The pub in 2016

General information
- Type: Public house
- Location: 35 Bootle Street, Manchester, England
- Coordinates: 53.4785°N 2.2478°W
- Year built: 19th century

The Sir Ralph Abercromby, also known as the Abercrombie, is a public house between Jackson's Row and Bootle Street, in Manchester, England, named after Lieutenant-General Sir Ralph Abercromby. Built in the 19th century, it is one of the few structures remaining in the area from the time of the Peterloo Massacre. Wounded people from the massacre were brought to the pub for medical treatment. Many later changes were made to the building, both inside and outside, with no substantial 19th-century features remaining. It is thought to be the inspiration for the pub in Life on Mars.

The pub is owned by Enterprise Inns. It has a central bar, a function room (formerly a games room) and a beer garden. In February 2016, it won a Campaign for Real Ale (CAMRA) award for "Pub of the season".

In 2014, it was threatened with demolition, along with Bootle Street police station and Manchester Reform Synagogue, to make way for the St Michael's redevelopment of the area led by Gary Neville. A Change.org petition to save the pub was signed by over 3,500 people. An application by members of CAMRA to list the building was declined by Historic England as the building was not of "national interest". Several applications to Manchester City Council to protect the pub as an asset of community value were also declined in 2014 and 2016. The possibility of dismantling it and doing a brick-by-brick rebuild in a new location was aired in 2016, but is likely to be costly.

On 12 July 2017, the revised plans for the development included Neville's consortium buying and retaining The Sir Ralph Abercromby. Neville was reported as saying "There’s no doubt we underestimated, not the architectural importance of the pub, but the actual social community importance of the pub".
