= Leicester City Police =

Defunct police force

The city of Leicester in England was policed independently until 1 April 1967 when its police force was merged with the Leicestershire and Rutland Constabulary to form the Leicester and Rutland Constabulary.

From about 1750 until September 1835 the borough corporation appointed night watchmen and day "police".

Under the Municipal Corporations Act the councillors of Leicester were required to appoint a Watch Committee and to make arrangements for the proper policing of the town.

The Leicester Borough Police force was established in January 1836. The first headquarters was in the medieval Leicester Guildhall. In 1875, the headquarters moved to the Leicester Town Hall. In 1933, the city's police force moved into its own new purpose-built Leicester City Police Headquarters, designed by G. Noel Hill and A.T. Gooseman in the Leicester City Architects' Department.

The first Inspector and "Head Constable" was Frederick Goodyer who previously served with the Metropolitan Police in London since 1829. There were initially five sergeants and fifty constables in the force.

The last Chief Constable of the Leicester City Police was Robert Mark who later became the Commissioner of the Metropolitan Police.
