= Manchester City Police Headquarters =

Former police headquarters in Manchester, England

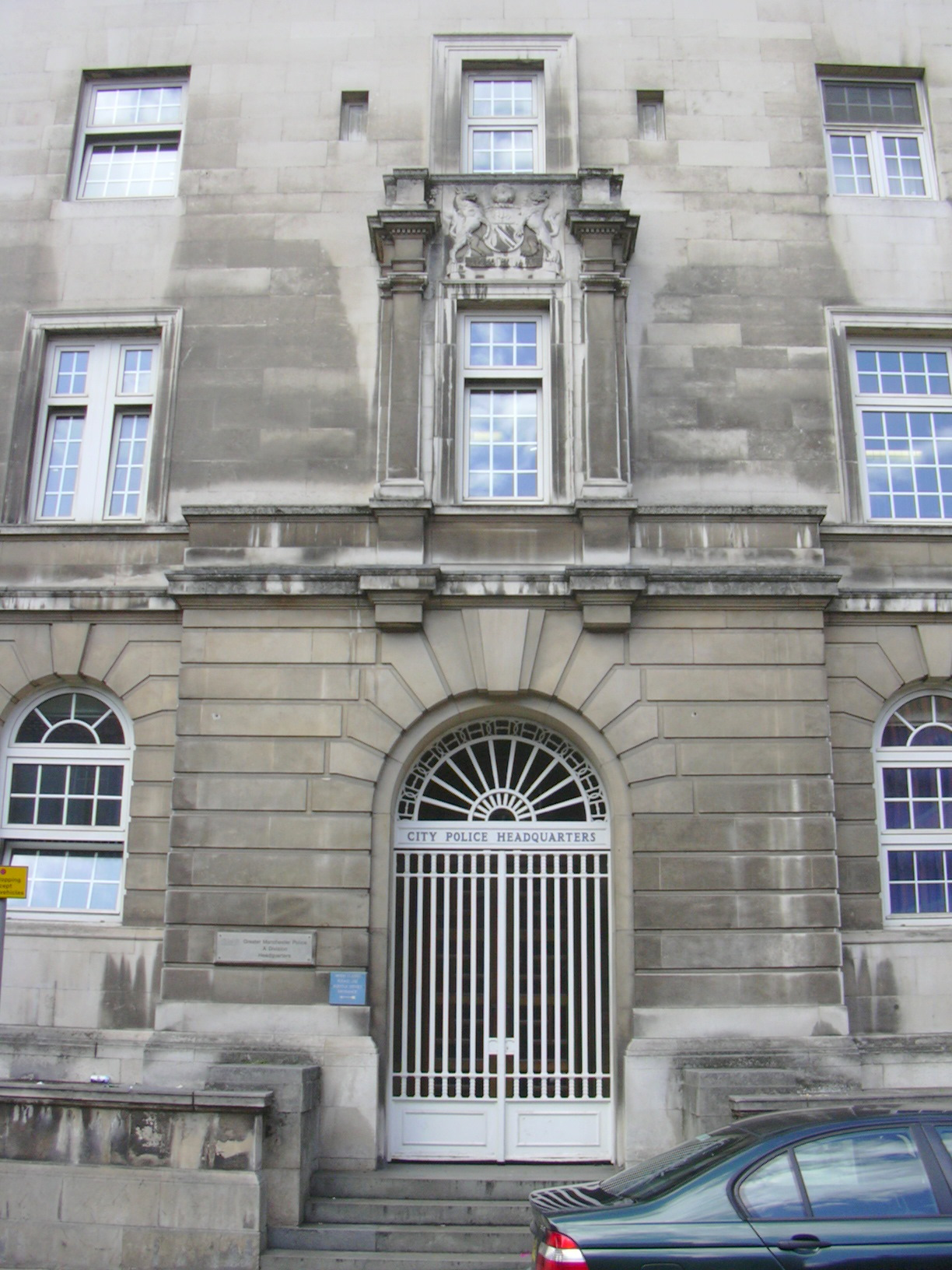
- Entrance on Southmill Street
- Interactive map of the Manchester City Police Headquarters area

General information
- Type: Police station (formerly)
- Architectural style: Palladian
- Location: Southmill Street, Manchester, England
- Coordinates: 53°28′42.85″N 2°14′47.94″W
- Year built: 1933–1937
- Groundbreaking: 6 September 1934 (foundation stone)
- Construction started: July 1933
- Completed: 1937
- Opened: 16 July 1937
- Relocated: 2011
- Renovated: 2022
- Closed: 2014
- Cost: £100,500
- Client: City of Manchester
- Owner: Manchester City Police, Manchester City Council

Technical details
- Material: Portland stone, brick
- Floor count: 6

Design and construction
- Architect: G. Noel Hill
- Architecture firm: Manchester City Architect's Department
- Main contractor: J. Gerrard and Sons, Swinton

The Manchester City Police Headquarters is a former police building on Southmill Street in Manchester, England. Built between 1933 and 1937 to designs by the architect G. Noel Hill, it served as the headquarters of the Manchester City Police and later the Greater Manchester Police until its closure in 2014. Most of the building has since been demolished as part of the St Michael's redevelopment, although the Portland stone façade has been retained.

== Description ==
The building is flanked on three sides by Bootle Street (south), Southmill Street (east), and Jackson's Row (north). The main vehicular entrance was on Bootle Street, with the formal entrance door on Southmill Street. Opposite to the east is the Friend's Meeting House, used as a conference centre.

The building was designed by G. Noel Hill, the Manchester City Architect, and erected during 1933–37 by the contractor J. Gerrard and Sons of Swinton. The main facade on Southmill Street is faced with Portland stone and the other walls are of golden honey brick. There was a partially covered 150×50 feet courtyard in the centre of the building. There were six floors in total, a basement, lower ground floor (including cells and a garage), ground floor (including a museum), first floor, second floor to the front and sides, and to the front only a third floor.

The foundation stone for the building was laid by Councillor Reginald Ashley Larmuth, the chairman of the Watch Committee, on 6 September 1934. The building was opened by The Rt Hon. Alderman Joseph Toole JP, then the Lord Mayor of Manchester, on 16 July 1937.

== Later developments ==
Manchester City Police merged with the Salford City Police to create the Manchester and Salford Police in 1968, which itself was amalgamated into the Greater Manchester Police in 1974. In 2011, Greater Manchester Police moved to a new headquarters in north Manchester. The building closed as a police station in 2014.

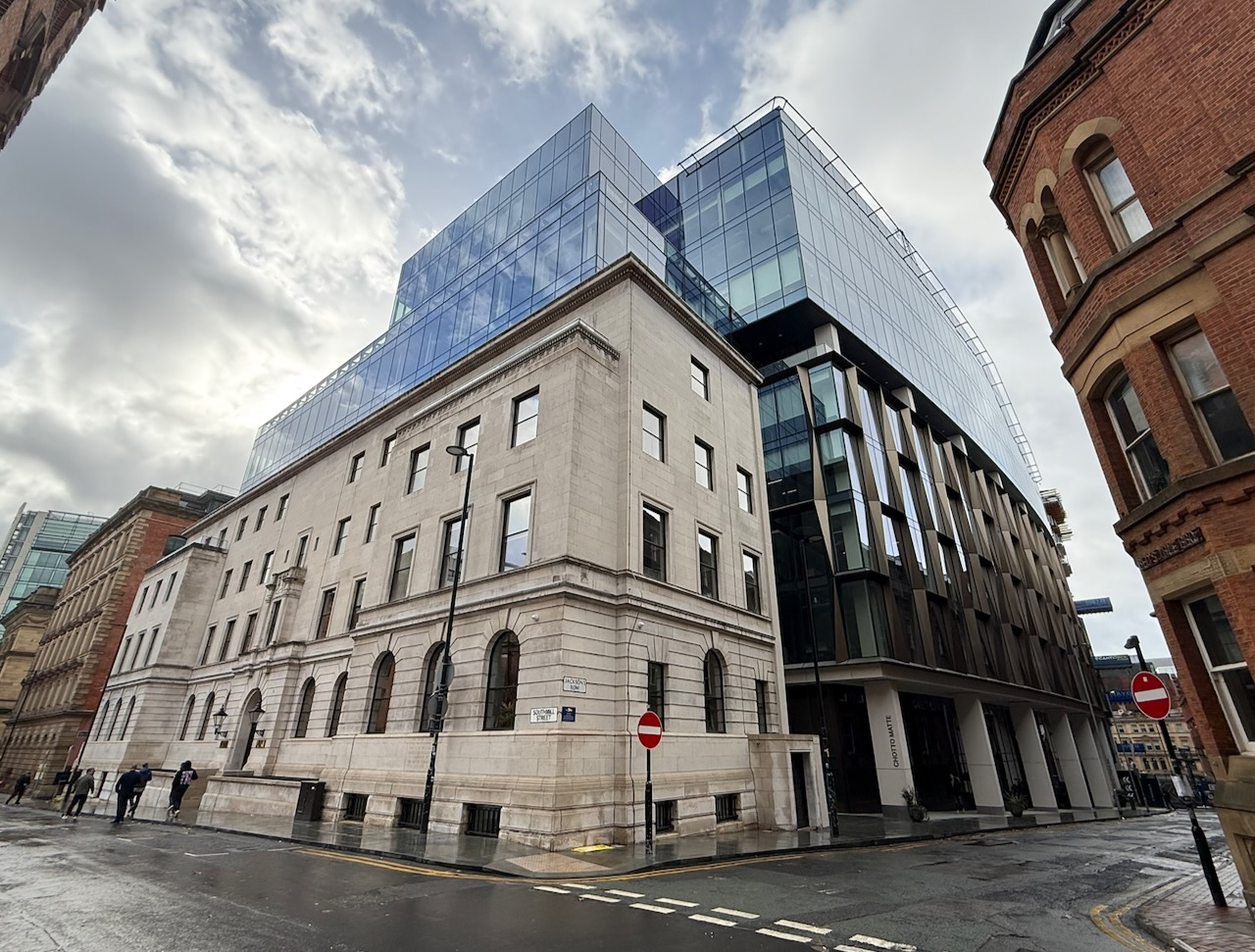
St Michael's, Manchester redevelopment

The site has been redeveloped from 2022, including the construction of a new 41-storey high-rise building, as part of St Michael's, a development project by Gary Neville's company Relentless Developments. The building was largely demolished, but the side with the Portland stone facade has been retained.

== See also ==
- Greater Manchester Police Museum
- Leicester City Police Headquarters
