= St Michael's, Manchester =

Mixed-use redevelopment project in Manchester, England

St Michael's
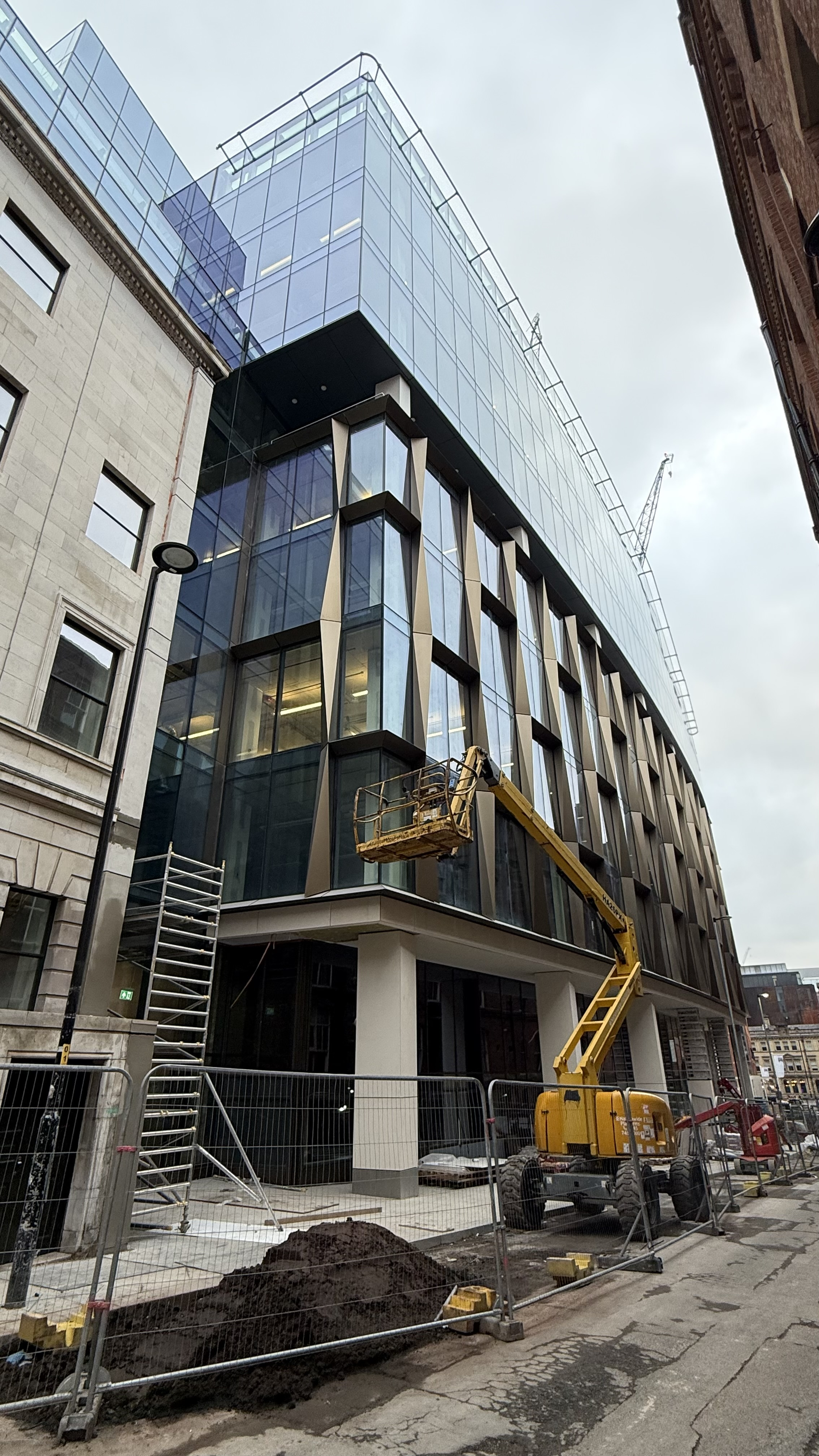
- W Residences on Jackson’s Row in St Michael's under construction, February 2025

- Location within Greater Manchester

General information
- Status: No. 1 St Michael's: Complete; No. 2 St Michael's: Under construction
- Location: Jackson's Row, Manchester, England
- Coordinates: 53.4787°N 2.2465°W
- Construction started: January 2022
- Estimated completion: 2027

Design and construction
- Architect: Hodder + Partners
- Developer: Relentless Developments (Gary Neville)
- Main contractor: Bowmer + Kirkland; Domis Construction

Website
- www.st-michaels.com

St Michael's is a mixed-use redevelopment scheme on Jackson's Row in Manchester city centre, England, led by Relentless Developments, a company associated with Gary Neville. The project is being delivered in two phases and includes offices, hospitality venues, a public square, and a 43‑storey, 144-metre (472 ft) tower planned to house a W Hotel and residential units. Construction began in 2022. The first phase, comprising the No. 1 St Michael's office building and associated leisure uses, opened in 2025. The second phase, known as No. 2 St Michael's, is expected to be completed in 2027.

== Development ==
St Michael's Manchester is a redevelopment project by Gary Neville's company Relentless Developments on the site of the former Manchester City Police Headquarters, Manchester Reform Synagogue and Sir Ralph Abercromby pub on Jackson's Row in Manchester city centre. It is planned to comprise two towers, nine and 41 storeys tall, containing a 191-room hotel, 181 flats, a 900-seat rooftop restaurant, 185,000 sq ft (17,200 m^{2}) of office space, and a new public park, St Michael's Square.

== History ==
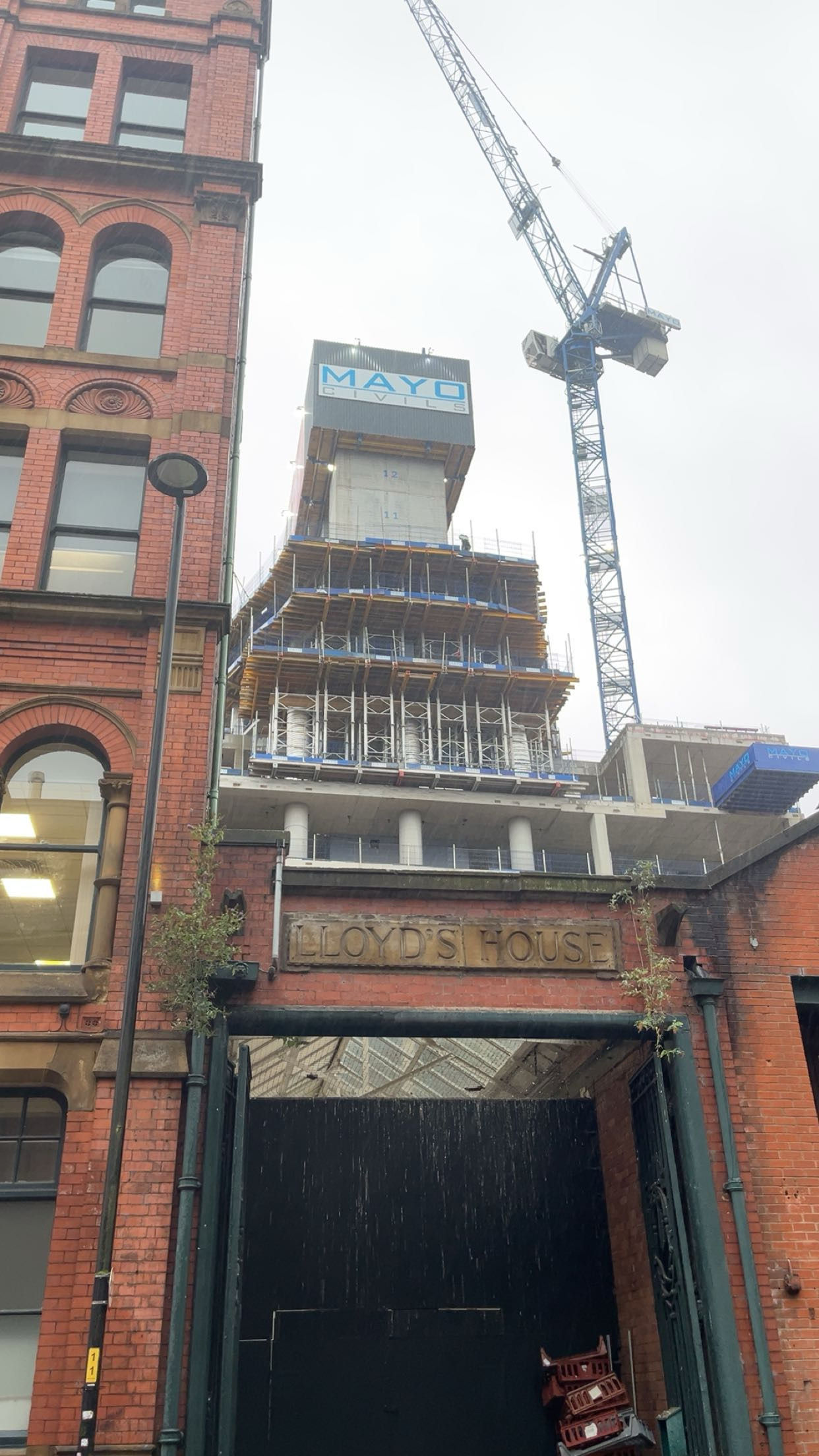
No. 2 St Michael's under construction, September 2025

The development was proposed in 2016, originally by Neville in partnership with Ryan Giggs, after almost ten years of land acquisition and planning, and was to have had 21-storey and 31-storey black-clad towers designed by architecture firm Make. There were objections to the size and design of the towers, the loss of historic buildings, and the lack of affordable housing.

After a redesign, with Make leaving the project and being replaced by Hodder + Partners, retention of the pub and police station façades, and expansion of the planned retail component, it was approved by Manchester City Council in March 2018. Giggs resigned from the venture in 2020, and the conversion of the police station into a second, 29-room hotel was replaced with office conversion in 2021 because of economic contraction in the wake of the COVID pandemic.

=== Phase One ===
Construction of Phase One, the nine-storey office block with rooftop restaurant and St Michael's Square known as No. 1 St Michael's, was begun by Bowmer + Kirkland in January 2022, and completed in spring 2025. Relentless developed this phase in partnership with the American investment company KKR.

=== Phase Two ===
Phase Two, known as No. 2 St Michael's, is to be a 43-storey building containing the hotel and apartments, developed by Relentless with Salboy Group. Domis began construction in January 2023 for scheduled completion in 2026 or 2027. A synagogue will also be featured to replace the building demolished to make way for Phase Two.

== See also ==
- List of tallest buildings and structures in Greater Manchester
- List of tallest buildings in the United Kingdom
