= Appleby Lodge =

1930s blocks of flats in Manchester, England

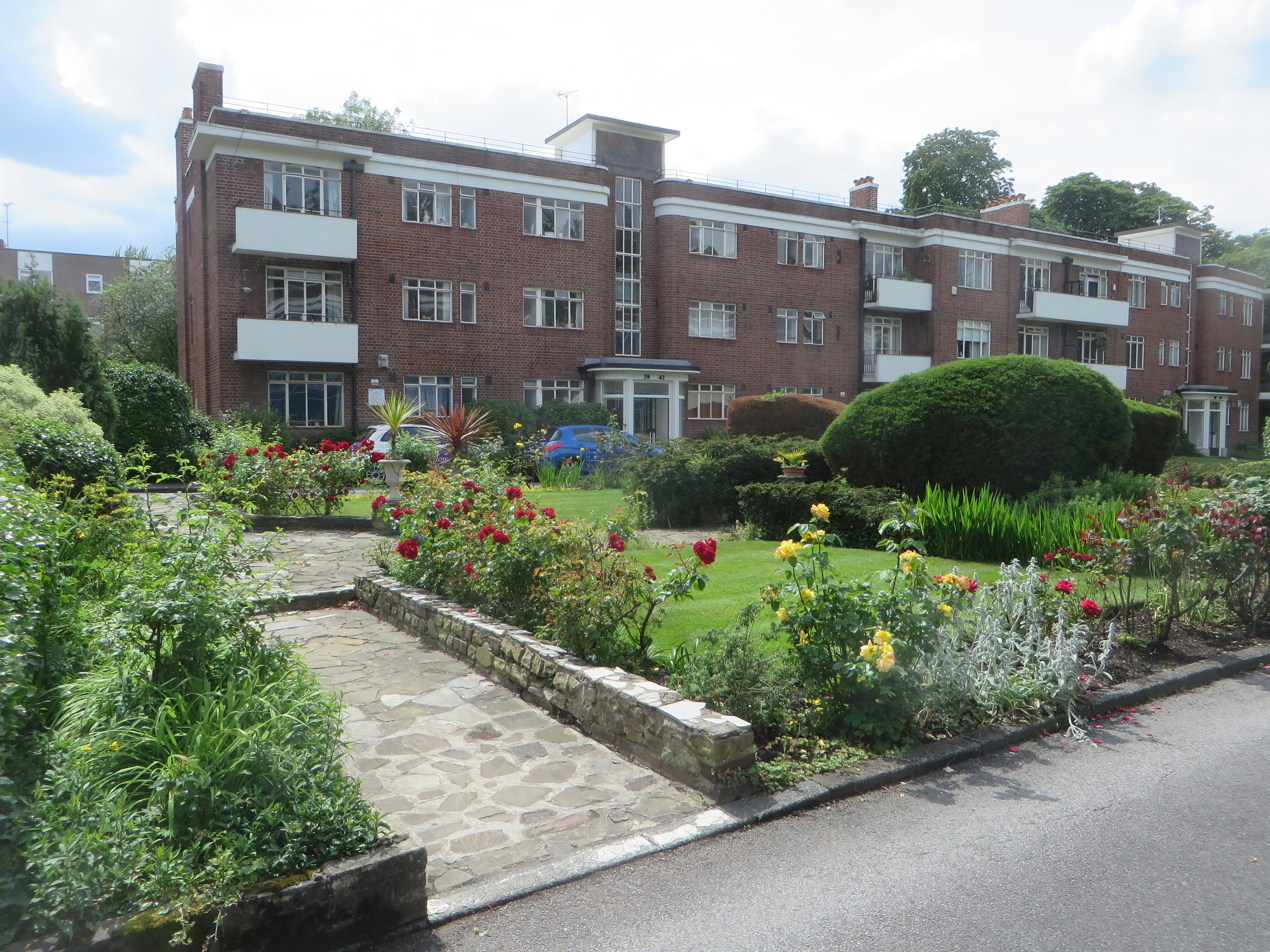
- Interactive map of the Appleby Lodge area

General information
- Type: Blocks of flats
- Architectural style: Streamline Moderne (Art Deco)
- Location: Wilmslow Road, Rusholme, Manchester, England
- Coordinates: 53°26′55″N 2°13′8″W
- Construction started: 1936
- Completed: 1939
- Renovated: 2019 (windows)
- Client: Town and Country Consolidated Properties

Technical details
- Material: Red brick
- Floor count: 3

Design and construction
- Architect: Peter Cummings
- Architecture firm: Gunton & Gunton
- Designations

Listed Building – Grade II
- Official name: Appleby Lodge
- Designated: 4 March 2003
- Reference no.: 1096151

Other information
- Number of rooms: 102 apartments
- Parking: Garages and parking spaces

Website
- applebylodge.co.uk

Appleby Lodge is a set of three-storey 1930s blocks of flats with eight entrance doors, opposite Platt Fields Park on Wilmslow Road in Rusholme, Manchester, England. The blocks are in a U-shape around a central garden.

== Overview ==
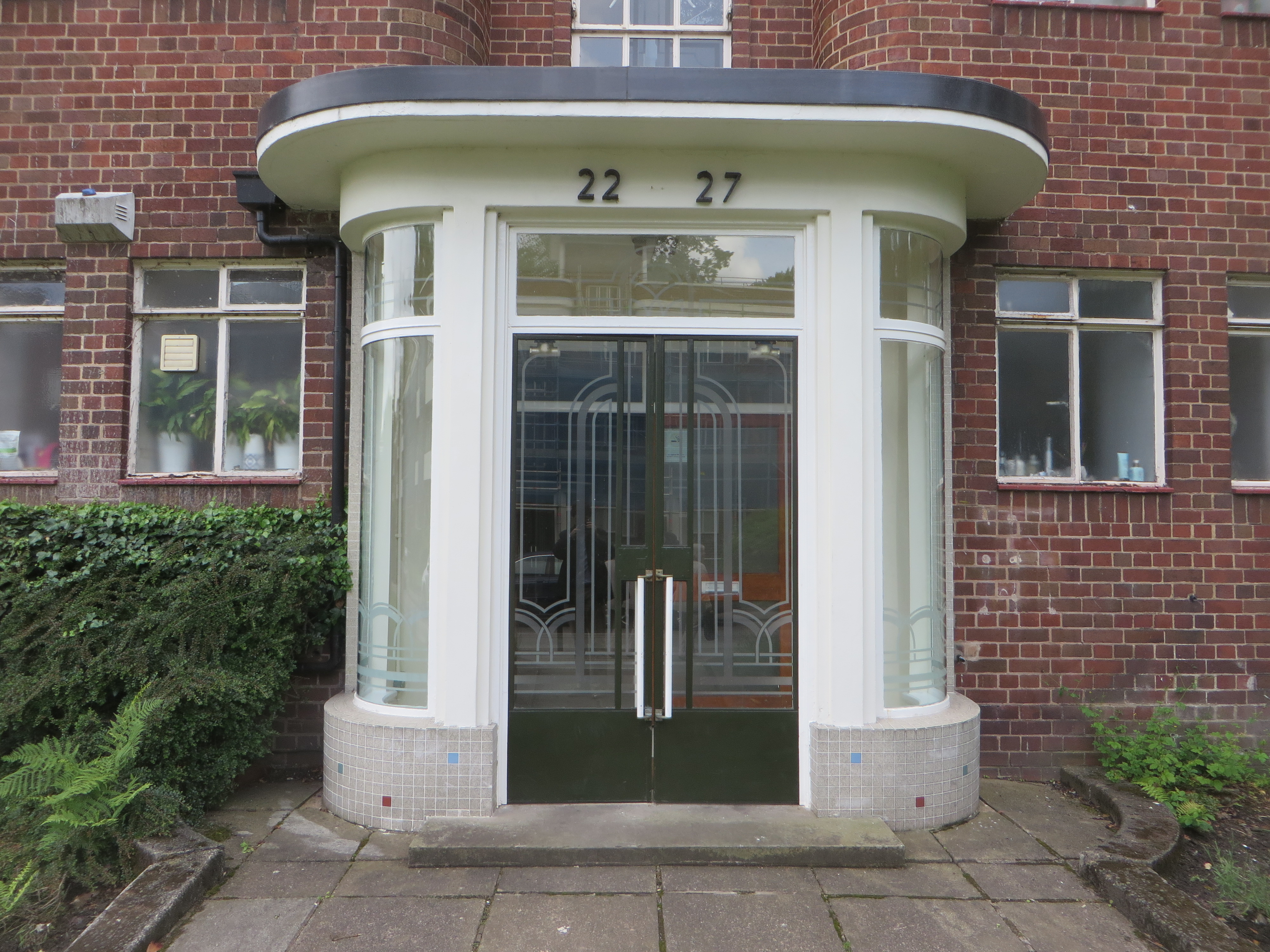
Entrance door

The buildings consist of a group of three main blocks of flats in the Moderne style arranged around a central garden. They are in red brick with parapets and flat roofs, and have three storeys. The windows and door frames are in steel. The blocks at right angles to the road have rounded ends, and the other block at the east end has a U-shaped plan. The flats have cantilevered balconies, those on the ends being curved. At intervals are flat-roofed porches, and above them are recessed stair towers with full-height small-paned windows.

Appleby Lodge is run by Appleby Lodge Management Company Limited.

== History ==
Appleby Lodge was designed by Gunton & Gunton with Peter Cummings (1879–1957), who was also the architect of the Manchester Apollo theatre and the Cornerhouse cinema. It was built between 1936 and 1939 for Town and Country Consolidated Properties, with 100 apartments in total.

Residents have included the architect Peter Cummings and Sir John Barbirolli, conductor of the Hallé Orchestra, from 1943 to 1963, commemorated with a blue plaque.

The buildings were Grade II listed in 2003. The original Crittall steel-framed windows were replaced in 2019. The buildings have been described by the architectural historian Elain Harwood of Historic England as an "urban oasis". In 2020 Appleby Lodge was selected as one of Greater Manchester's best looking streets by the Manchester Evening News newspaper.

== See also ==
- Grade II listed buildings in Manchester
- Listed buildings in Manchester-M14
