= Sharston =

Area of Manchester, England

Coordinates: 53.3935°N 2.2488°W

- Location within Greater Manchester
- Population: 16,754 (2011)
- OS grid reference: SJ835885
- Metropolitan borough: Manchester
- Metropolitan county: Greater Manchester
- Region: North West
- Country: England
- Sovereign state: United Kingdom
- Post town: MANCHESTER
- Postcode district: M22
- Dialling code: 0161
- Police: Greater Manchester
- Fire: Greater Manchester
- Ambulance: North West
- UK Parliament: Wythenshawe and Sale East
- Councillors: David McCullough (Reform); Tim Whiston (Labour Co-op); Sian Astley (Labour)

Sharston is an area of Wythenshawe, south Manchester, England. The population at the 2011 census was 16,754.

== History ==
Built on former farming land (as was most of Wythenshawe when the estate was first being built in the 1920s), the area was initially mostly industrial, with Sharston Industrial Estate containing a post office (with an area sorting office), a dairy, a Bisto factory, and various other businesses.

Wythenshawe Bus Garage was built in Harling Road off Sharston Road in 1942 by Manchester Corporation Transport Department to house and service 100 double deck buses used on routes to and from the expanding housing estates. It still exists in other use and is a listed building. Northenden railway station was just off Sharston Road, but closed in late 1964.

However, more recent boundary changes in the Wythenshawe district now consider Sharston to cover a considerable portion of residential housing along Wythenshawe's east side. The industrial estate consists of sectors named after letters of the Greek alphabet. The Beta sector was once the home of the Ramsees Piso Bush jam factory. This building later became the headquarters of Jam Factory Records who kept most of the original plant machinery to make speciality jams to promote album releases.

A large public swimming baths was opened in the area in March 1961 that was, at the time, Manchester's largest pool (32 metres) and also had multi-level diving facilities. The pool was often used for spectator events with seating for over 800 people. Sharston once had its own shopping parade, built in the 1930s on Altrincham Road (next to the junction of Mullacre Road), but this was demolished in early 1973 when the M56 motorway Sharston bypass was built through the area (where the M56 connects to the nearby southern section of the M60 motorway). A new shopping precinct was built directly behind the swimming baths on Sharston Green to replace the soon-to-be demolished shops on Altrincham Road. The new precinct, which opened in early 1973 just before the demolition of the old shops, contained over twenty shops and a bank, as well as new premises for the Wythenshawe Labour Club public house (relocated from Greenwood Road) which was opened by former Prime Minister Harold Wilson in February 1973. However, the new Sharston Green shopping precinct suffered from poor trading from the outset and was often referred to in the local press as a "white elephant" which had been badly planned in all respects. By the 1980s, most of the premises were being used for small businesses rather than shops and many premises were empty altogether. In November 1990, Manchester City Council closed the swimming baths as part of a series of cost-cutting measures. In May 1991, the vacant and now heavily vandalised building was targeted by arsonists. Businesses continued to leave the Sharston Green precinct, and in April 1994 the once-popular Wythenshawe Labour Club closed with debts totaling £100,000. Less than two weeks later, arsonists set fire to the abandoned building. The entire precinct, including the baths, was eventually demolished and the land has since been used for new housing developments. Several pedestrian subway tunnels that linked the area under the busy main roads have now been closed off and replaced with various pelican crossings.

Two high schools were also situated in the area. Sharston High School (which later became South Manchester High School - upper) was situated between Brownley Road and Altrincham Road. Among its former pupils was actor Harry H Corbett. St. Augustine's Grammar School (which became St. John Plessington RC High School in 1977 and then St. Paul's RC High School in the 1980s) was situated at the far end of Stancliffe Road. Of the latter school's more notable alumni are Johnny Marr and Andy Rourke of the band The Smiths, who were pupils there from 1975 to 1980. Both schools closed in the 1980s and were demolished. The ground where they stood was used for new housing developments, though part of the ground where St. Augustine's stood has also been used to extend Hollyhedge Park, which now stretches for almost half a mile from Hollyhedge Road to Altrincham Road.

=== Sharston Hall ===
Sharston Hall (from which the area gained its name, which in turn got its name from the Shar Stone, which is located at Rose Hill, in nearby Northenden) was a large house on Altrincham Road. Built in 1701, it was the home of the Worthington and Egerton families for generations before being sold to Manchester Local Authority in 1926, as was the smaller adjoining Victorian property, Sharston Manor. The hall was no longer tenanted after 1970 and quickly fell into disrepair. By 1972, it had endured a fire and considerable vandalism after plans to put a youth club in the building proved unsuccessful. Over the course of the next decade, various plans to turn the building into residential flats, offices, a restaurant or even a hotel all failed. By 1983 the building had partially collapsed with some masonry from the roof falling onto Altrincham Road. It was eventually demolished a couple of years later (the equally vandalised Sharston Manor had also been demolished) and a new commercial office building, built in a Georgian style, was completed on the site in 1986 along with a new housing development (Grosvenor Gardens). The office building currently houses a private medical clinic. The grounds behind the hall included a small woodland area which led onto Shenton Fields (informally known as "Shent's Fields"), a large recreational field that ran up to the border of neighbouring Gatley in Stockport. Although some of the woodland area still stands, the playing fields were turned into an industrial area (Sharston Green Business Park) which was completed in 2001 and contains several large warehouses and business premises.

== Governance ==
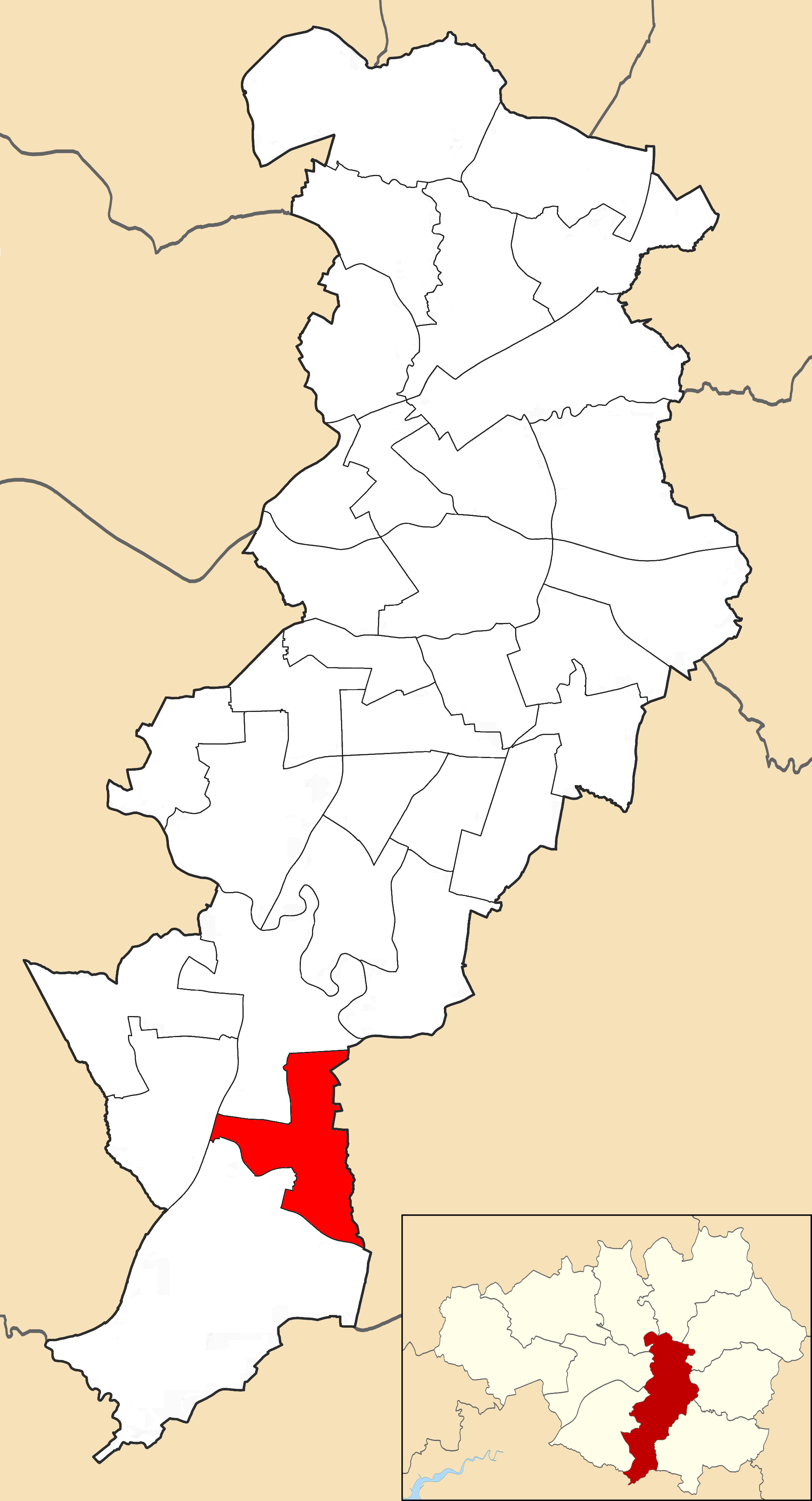
Sharston electoral ward within Manchester City Council

Sharston is part of the Wythenshawe and Sale East constituency, represented by the Labour Party MP Mike Kane.

Councillors

Sharston is a ward within the local authority of Manchester City Council. The ward is represented by three Councillors: Tim Whiston (Lab Co-op), Emma Taylor (Lab), and David McCullough (Ref)

| Election | Councillor | Councillor | Councillor |
|---|---|---|---|
| 2018 | Hugh Barrett (Lab Co-op) | Madeleine Monaghan (Lab) | Tommy Judge (Lab Co-op) |
| 2019 | Tim Whiston (Labour Co-op) | Madeleine Monaghan (Lab) | Tommy Judge (Labour Co-op) |
| 2021 | Tim Whiston (Labour Co-op) | Emma Taylor (Lab) | Tommy Judge (Labour Co-op) |
| 2022 | Tim Whiston (Labour Co-op) | Emma Taylor (Lab) | Tommy Judge (Labour Co-op) |
| 2023 | Tim Whiston (Labour Co-op) | Emma Taylor (Lab) | Tommy Judge (Labour Co-op) |
| 2024 | Tim Whiston (Labour Co-op) | Emma Taylor (Lab) | Tommy Judge (Labour Co-op) |
| 2026 | Tim Whiston (Labour Co-op) | Emma Taylor (Lab) | David McCullough (Ref) |

indicates seat up for re-election.

== Public services ==
Sharston is policed by the Wythenshawe Neighbourhood Policing Team, part of the South Manchester Division of Greater Manchester Police.

== Bibliography ==
- Butt, R.V.J. (1995). The Directory of Railway Stations. Patrick Stephens. ISBN 1-85260-508-1.
