= Colton Square Business Park =

Business park in Leicester, England

Coordinates: 52.6338062°N 1.1269066°W

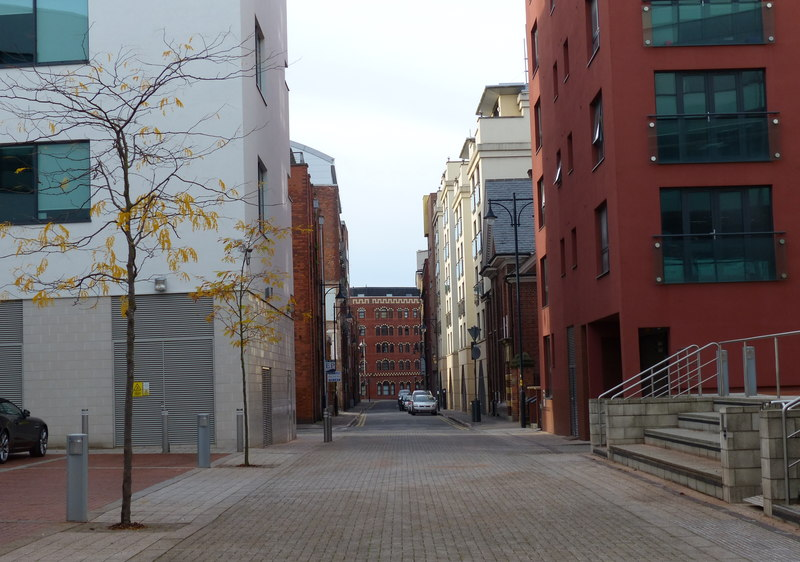
Colton Square, Leicester

Colton Square Business Park is a business park in central Leicester, England. The park is a combination of the former Charles Street Police Station (a.k.a. Leicester City Police Headquarters), a listed building, and new modern office buildings. It was established in 2006.

Learndirect, Freeth Cartwright, and Brewin Dolphin are among the park's occupiers.

In 2019, the building complex was sold for £21 million.

== See also ==
- Leicester City Police Headquarters
