= Peter Cummings (architect) =

Peter Cummings FRIBA FMSA
- Born: 1879; Minsk. Russia
- Died: 8 June 1957 (aged 77–78)
- Occupation: Architect
- Projects: Cornerhouse, formerly Tatler cinema (1934) Ardwick Apollo theatre (1938) Appleby Lodge apartment blocks (1939) Manchester Reform Synagogue (1952, with Eric Levy)

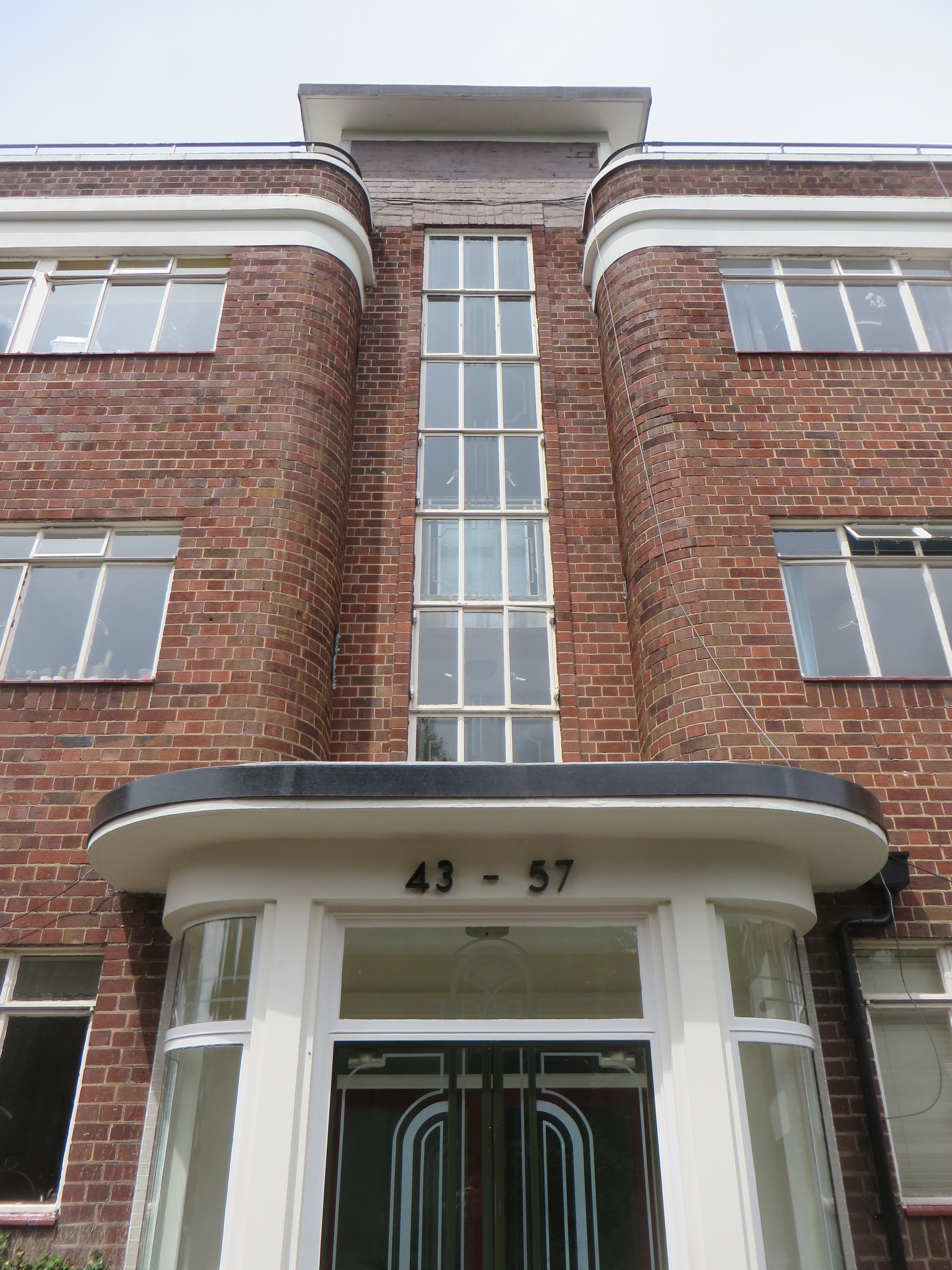
Appleby Lodge, Manchester, UK

Peter Cummings FRIBA FMSA (1879 – 8 June 1957) was a British architect of Russian origin. He was a leading Art Deco architect in Manchester, England.

Cummings was born Peter Caminesky in Minsk. Russia. He moved to Cheetham Hill, Manchester, northern England, in 1880 with his parents, due to persecution. His father was a rabbi. He worked as an architectural assistant in his teenage years. Cummings was elected Associate of the RIBA in 1909. He anglicised his name and became naturalised in 1928.

Cummings was the architect of the Cornerhouse (originally Tatler) cinema (1934) and the Manchester Apollo theatre (1937–1938) in Manchester. The Appleby Lodge apartment blocks on Wilmslow Road, Rusholme, were designed by Gunton & Gunton with Peter Cummings and built during 1936–1939. From 1939, Peter Cummings lived at Appleby Lodge with his new wife Esther. The blocks were Grade II listed in 2003. He also designed the Manchester Reform Synagogue with Eric Levy (1952, opened in 1953), after the original building was destroyed in 1941 during the Manchester Blitz.

== See also ==
- List of British architects
