= 2027 Manchester City Council election =

2027 English local government election

- 6 May 2027

32 out of 96 seats to Manchester City Council 49 seats needed for a majority
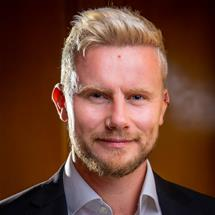

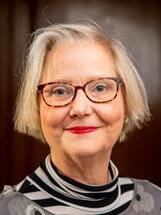

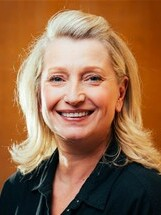

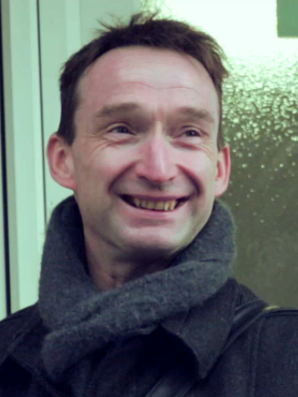
Leader	Garry Bridges	Astrid Johnson
Party	Labour	Green
Leader since	3 September 2026	17 August 2025
Leader's seat	Old Moat	Woodhouse Park
Last election	63 seats, 30.7%	21 seats, 37.1%
Current seats	64	21
Leader	Sian Astley	John Leech
Party	Reform	Liberal Democrats
Leader since	8 May 2026
Leader's seat	Baguley	Didsbury West
Last election	7 seats, 16.5%	4 seats, 8.2%
Current seats	7	4
Incumbent Council leader
Garry Bridges
Labour

The 2027 Manchester City Council election is an upcoming election that will take place on Thursday 6 May 2027, alongside other local elections across the United Kingdom. One third of councillors (32) on Manchester City Council are up for election.

== Background ==
=== History ===
In the previous election in 2026, the Green Party won 18 of the 32 seats up for election with 37.1% of the vote, Reform UK won 7 seats with 16.5% of the vote, the Labour Party won 6 seats with 30.7% of the vote and the Liberal Democrats won 1 seat with 8.2% of the vote. Labour kept overall control of the council.

Councillors up for re-election in 2027 are those who were elected in 2023.

=== Changes since the last election ===
- In July 2026, Shahbaz Sarwar (Longsight), who was elected for the Workers Party in 2024, joined the Labour Party.
- A by-election in Burnage was triggered by the resignation of Labour councillor and Leader of Manchester City Council Bev Craig, following her election to the Greater Manchester Mayoralty. This by-election was held on 10 September 2026 and was held by Labour candidate Carl Austin-Behan.

Burnage by-election, 10th September 2026
Party	Candidate	Votes	%	±%
Labour	Carl Austin-Behan	1,365	42.1	▼11.1
Green	Daoud Nawaz	1,037	32.0	▲12.8
Workers Party	Gaz Ranjha	466	14.4	▼2.3
Reform	Heather McDonagh	315	9.7	New
Liberal Democrats	Abdullah Vavdiwala	31	1.0	▼4.0
Conservative	Bhupinder Kumar	27	0.8	▼3.8
Majority		328	10.1	▼23.9
Rejected ballots		13	0.4	▲0.2
Turnout		3,254	23.6	▼12.6
Registered electors		13,815		
Labour hold		Swing	▼12.0	

- A by-election in Harpurhey was triggered by the death of Labour councillor Pat Karney. It will be held on 26 November 2026.

Harpurhey by-election: 26 November 2026
Party	Candidate	Votes	%	±%
Reform	Ian Carter			
Green	Sean Duggan			
Independent	Declan Gleeson			
Restore	James Harvie			
Conservative	Sarah Haynes			
Liberal Democrats	Peter Matthews			
Labour	Abdul Sarfraz			
Majority				
Turnout				
		Swing		

== Electoral process ==
The council elects its councillors in thirds, with a third being up for election every year for three years, with no election in the fourth year. Councillors are elected via first-past-the-post voting, with each ward represented by three councillors, one elected in each election year to serve a four-year term.

All registered electors (British, Irish, Commonwealth and European Union citizens) living in Manchester aged 18 or over will be entitled to vote in the election. People who live at two addresses in different councils, such as university students with different term-time and holiday addresses, are entitled to be registered for and vote in elections in both local authorities. Voting in-person at polling stations will take place from 07:00 to 22:00 on election day, and voters are able to apply for postal votes or proxy votes in advance of the election.

== Incumbents ==
Ward	Incumbent councillor		
Ward	Name	Party	Re-standing
Ancoats & Beswick	Chris Northwood	Liberal Democrats	
Ardwick	Amna Abdullatif	Green	Yes
Baguley	Munaver Rasul	Labour	
Brooklands	Glynn Evans	Labour	
Burnage	Azra Ali	Labour	
Charlestown	Basil Curley	Labour	
Cheetham	Shazia Butt	Labour	
Chorlton	Matthew Benham	Labour	
Chorlton Park	Dave Rawson	Labour	
Clayton & Openshaw	Sean McHale	Labour	
Crumpsall	Fiaz Rasiat	Labour	
Deansgate	Anthony McCaul	Labour	
Didsbury East	Leslie Bell	Labour	
Didsbury West	Richard Kilpatrick	Liberal Democrats	
Fallowfield	Jade Doswell	Labour	
Gorton & Abbey Hey	Afia Kamal	Labour	
Harpurhey	Vacant (Note: Previously held by Pat Karney, who died on 13 October 2026. Successor to be determined at a by-election on 26 November 2026.)	Labour	
Higher Blackley	Paula Sadler	Labour	
Hulme	Annette Wright	Labour	
Levenshulme	Basat Sheikh	Labour	
Longsight	Suzanne Richards	Labour	
Miles Platting & Newton Heath	John Flanagan	Labour	
Moss Side	Mahdi Mahamed	Labour	
Moston	Yasmine Dar	Labour	
Northenden	Richard Fletcher	Labour	
Old Moat	Garry Bridges	Labour	
Piccadilly	Sam Wheeler	Labour	
Rusholme	Ahmed Ali	Labour	
Sharston	Tim Whiston	Labour	
Whalley Range	Angeliki Stogia	Labour	
Withington	Becky Chambers	Labour	
Woodhouse Park	Zoe Marlow	Green	No
