= Wythenshawe Bus Garage =

Listed building in Manchester, England

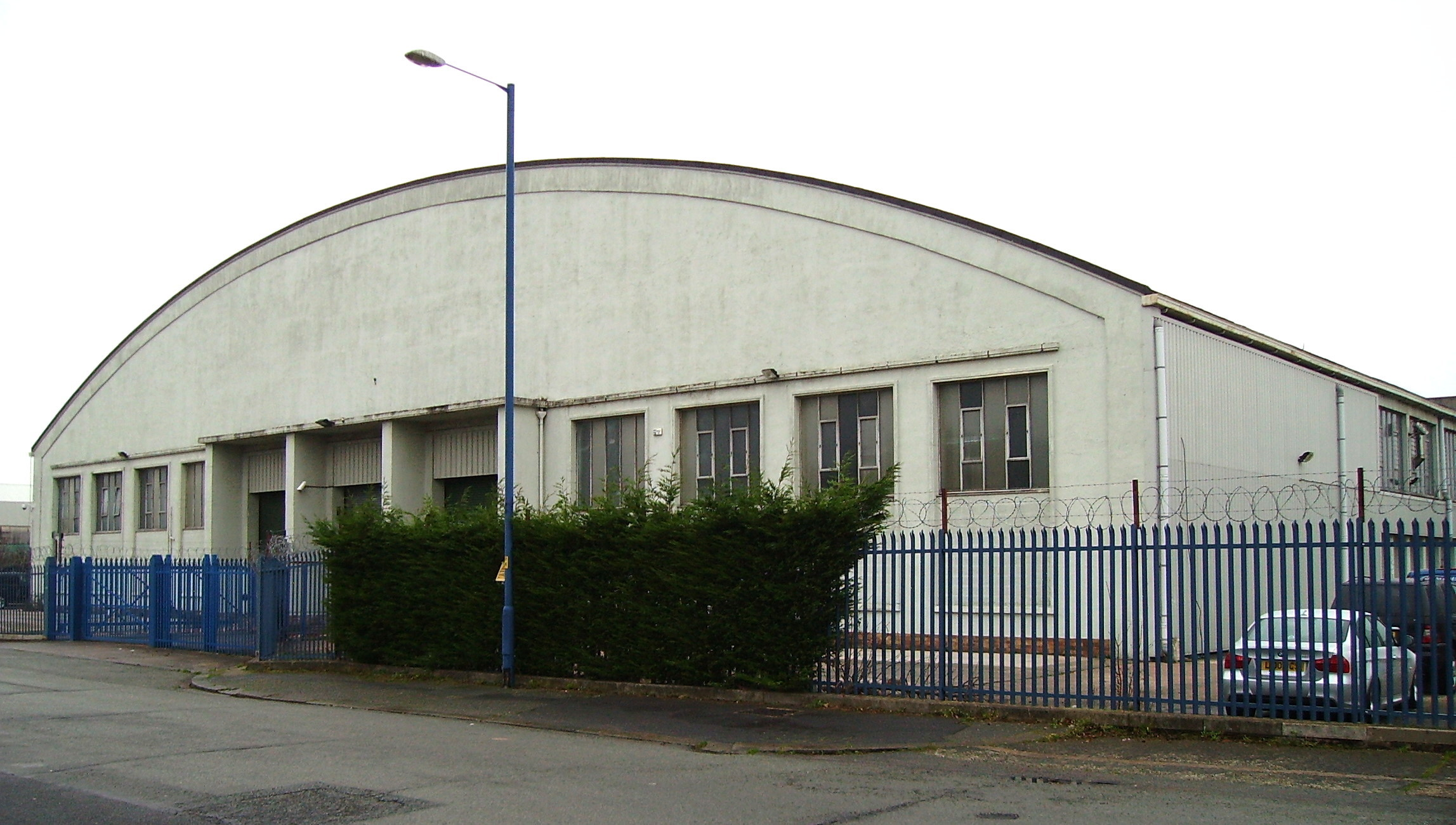
- Frontage
- Interactive map of the Wythenshawe Bus Garage area

General information
- Location: Bradnor Road, Sharston, Wythenshawe, Manchester, M22 4TE
- Coordinates: 53°24′04″N 2°15′22″W
- Completed: 1942; 84 years ago

Design and construction
- Architect: George Noel Hill
- Architecture firm: Manchester City Architects Department
- Designations

Listed Building – Grade II*
- Official name: Wythenshawe Bus Depot
- Designated: 12 July 2001
- Reference no.: 1389256

Wythenshawe Bus Garage is a Grade II* listed building in Wythenshawe, Manchester, England.

== History ==
Designed by Manchester City Architects Department under G. Noel Hill, and completed in 1942, the garage was a pioneering example of its type of construction. It is located on Harling Road, off Sharston Road in the Sharston district of Wythenshawe. It was the second-largest reinforced concrete shell roof structure to be constructed in England. The building's structure was particularly innovative for its time. Its concrete arches have a span of 165 feet (50 m) from side to side, are 42 feet (13 m) high and spaced 42 feet (13 m) apart. The tensile concrete shell roof between these concrete arches is just 2.5 inches (64 mm) thick and is punctured by large rooflights. Wythenshawe Garage proved to be the model for much larger buildings using the concrete shell roof structure technique, which was an economic method of achieving large uninterrupted roof spans.

Originally designed to garage a hundred double-decker buses, the building on its completion was immediately commandeered by the Ministry of Aircraft Production for work associated with the building and repair of Avro Lancaster bombers in support of Britain's Second World War efforts.

On its return to Manchester Corporation use in 1946, the building was known as Northenden garage. It housed buses used mainly on routes linking the city centre and the large Wythenshawe housing estate, also on three serving Gatley and Styal, the Sale Moor and Brooklands districts of Sale, and Baguley and the Timperley district of Altrincham.

In the late 20th century, the building transferred to private ownership and is used for car parking.

== See also ==
- Grade II* listed buildings in Greater Manchester
- Listed buildings in Manchester-M22
