= Leicester City Police Headquarters =

Former police headquarters in Leicester, England

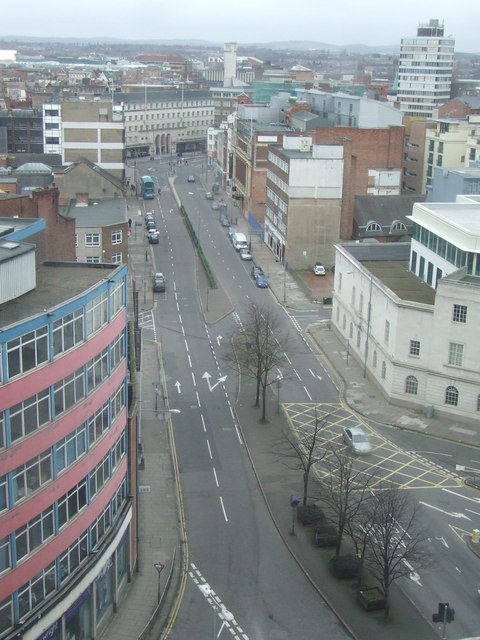
Leicester City Police Headquarters Charles Street with the police station building on the right

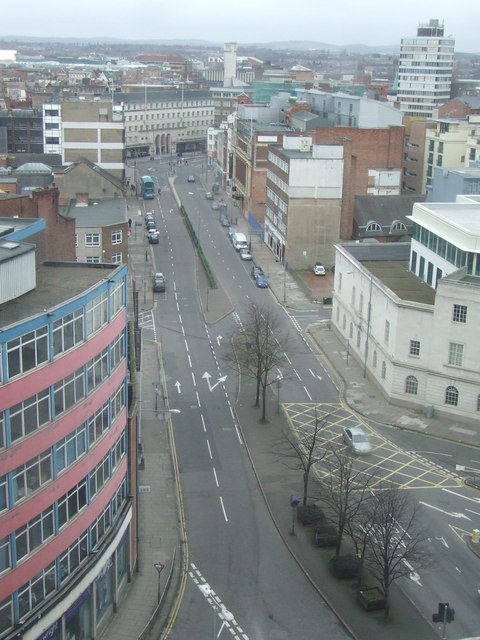
- Interactive map of the Leicester City Police Headquarters Charles Street with the police station building on the right area
- Alternative names: Charles Street Police Station

General information
- Status: Closed
- Type: Police station
- Architectural style: Palladian
- Location: Charles Street, Leicester, England, Leicester, United Kingdom
- Coordinates: 52.63340°N 1.12644°W
- Year built: 1931–1933
- Construction started: 1931
- Completed: 1933
- Opened: 1933
- Relocated: 2004
- Client: City of Leicester
- Owner: Leicester City Police, Leicester City Council

Technical details
- Material: Portland stone facade
- Floor count: 2 (3 in the centre)

Design and construction
- Architects: G. Noel Hill and A.T. Gooseman
- Architecture firm: Leicester City Architects' Department
- Awards and prizes: Grade II listed (1999)

The Leicester City Police Headquarters (aka the Charles Street Police Station) is a historic building located in Leicester, England. It was built during 1931–33 as the headquarters of the Leicester City Police.

== Description and history ==
The building has been described by Historic England as "a distinguished example of civic architecture". It is surrounded by Charles Street (southwest) and Church Street (northwest), Colton Street and Orton Square (northeast), and St George's Way, designated the A594, Leicester's inner ring road (southeast). The main entrance is to the south.

The first headquarters of the Leicester Borough Police from 1836 was in the medieval Leicester Guildhall. In 1875, the headquarters moved to the Leicester Town Hall. In 1933, the City Police moved into its own new purpose-built Leicester City Police Headquarters.

The building was designed by G. Noel Hill (later the Manchester City Architect) and A.T. Gooseman in the Leicester City Architects' Department, and constructed during 1931–33. The facade is faced with Portland stone. The central archway gate gave access to the main drill yard. The public enquiry office was to the right of the archway. The charge office and cell block were to the rear. There were two cottages at the back of the building that were converted into a garage and a gymnasium. A new telephone switchboard was installed in 1936.

During World War II, the Leicester City Police Headquarters was used as an Aliens Registration Office for Germans and Austrians in the area. The building was decorated for the Coronation of Elizabeth II. In August 1963, Gordon Goody was arrested in connection with the Great Train Robbery and taken to the Leicester City Police Headquarters for questioning by Detective Chief Inspector Peter Vibart of the Metropolitan Police's Flying Squad.

== Later developments ==
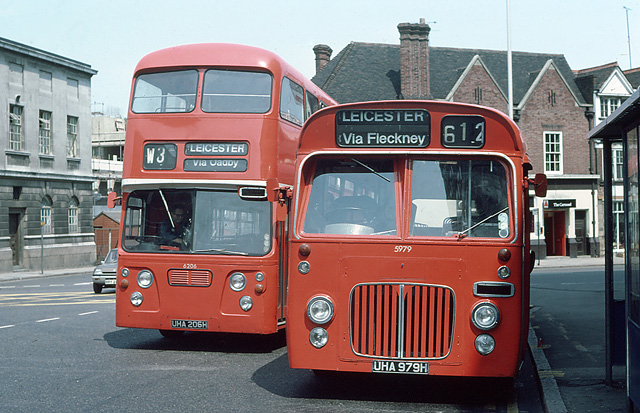
Bus at the Northampton Square terminus opposite the police station to the left in 1976

The city of Leicester was policed independently from this headquarters until 1967, when the city's police force was merged with the Leicestershire and Rutland Constabulary to form the Leicester and Rutland Constabulary. In 1974, the force was renamed as the Leicestershire Constabulary. The building was Grade II listed in 1999. In 2004, the building closed as a police station and the headquarters was moved to Enderby, a village in Leicestershire on the southwest outskirts of the city. In 2012, the police force's name changed to the Leicestershire Police.

The 1933 building still exists and has been converted into offices and flats, forming part of the Colton Square Business Park from 2006.

== See also ==
- Colton Square Business Park
- Leicestershire Police
- Manchester City Police Headquarters
