= Greater Manchester Police Museum =

Museum in Manchester, England

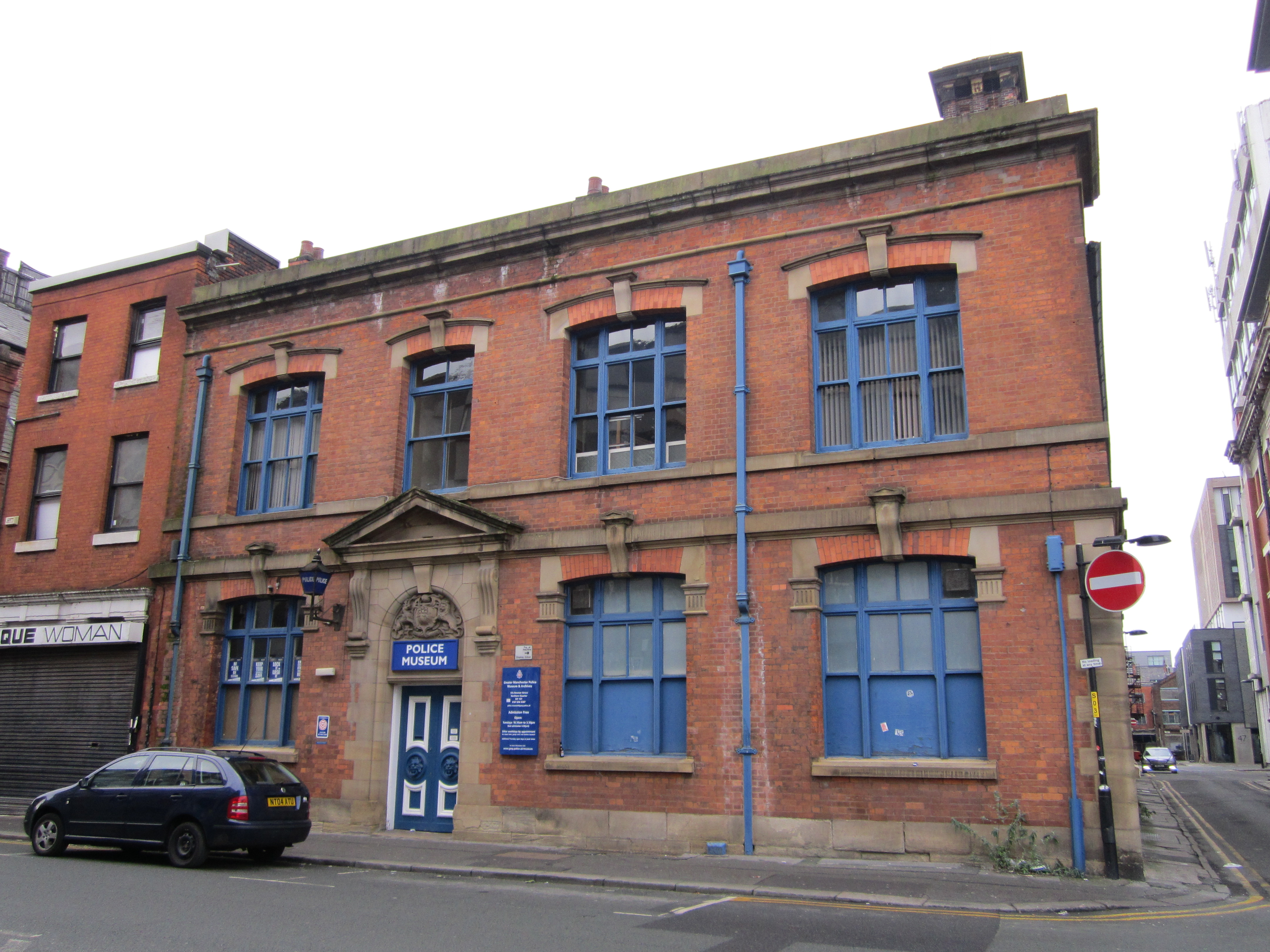
- Greater Manchester Police Museum
- Established: 1981
- Location: 57A Newton Street; Manchester; M1 1ET; England
- Coordinates: 53.48241°N 2.23240°W
- Type: Police museum
- Website: gmpmuseum.co.uk

Listed Building – Grade II
- Official name: Former Newton Street Police Station
- Designated: 5 June 1994
- Reference no.: 1246269

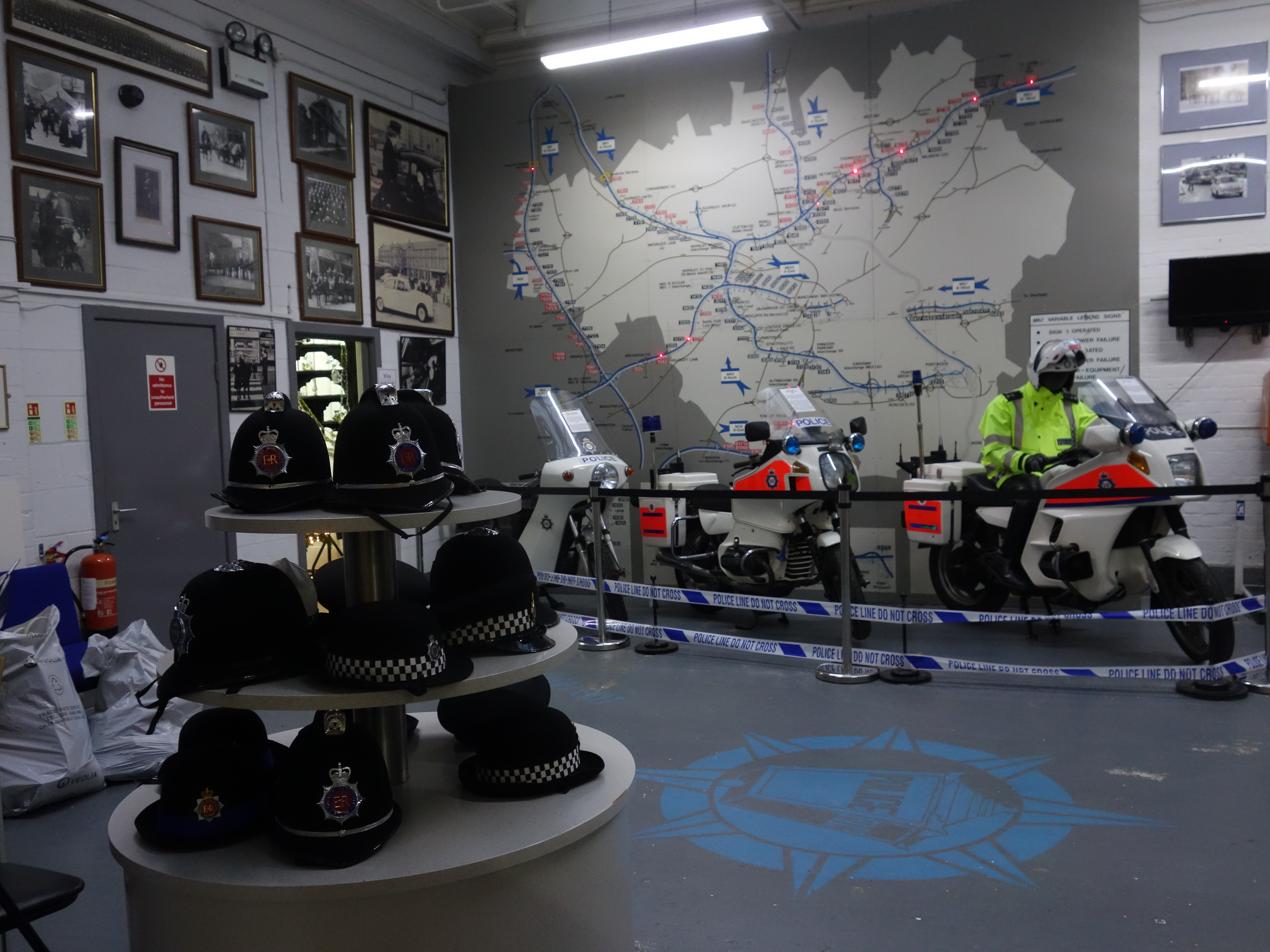
Helmets and motorcycles on display

The Greater Manchester Police Museum is a former police station converted into a museum and archives detailing the history of policing in Greater Manchester, England. It was home to Manchester City Police and then its successors Manchester and Salford Police and Greater Manchester Police from 1879 until 1979.

Upon its conversion to a museum in 1981, the interior was redesigned to reflect its past and now serves as a reminder of Victorian policing. On 5 June 1994, the building was Grade II listed as the Former Newton Street Police Station.

== Location ==
Located on Newton Street in Manchester's Northern Quarter, it is a short walk away from Piccadilly Gardens and Piccadilly railway station.

== See also ==
- Listed buildings in Manchester-M1
- Manchester City Police Headquarters
