= O2 Apollo Manchester =

Concert venue in Manchester, England

Coordinates: 53°28′11″N 2°13′20″W

O_{2} Apollo Manchester
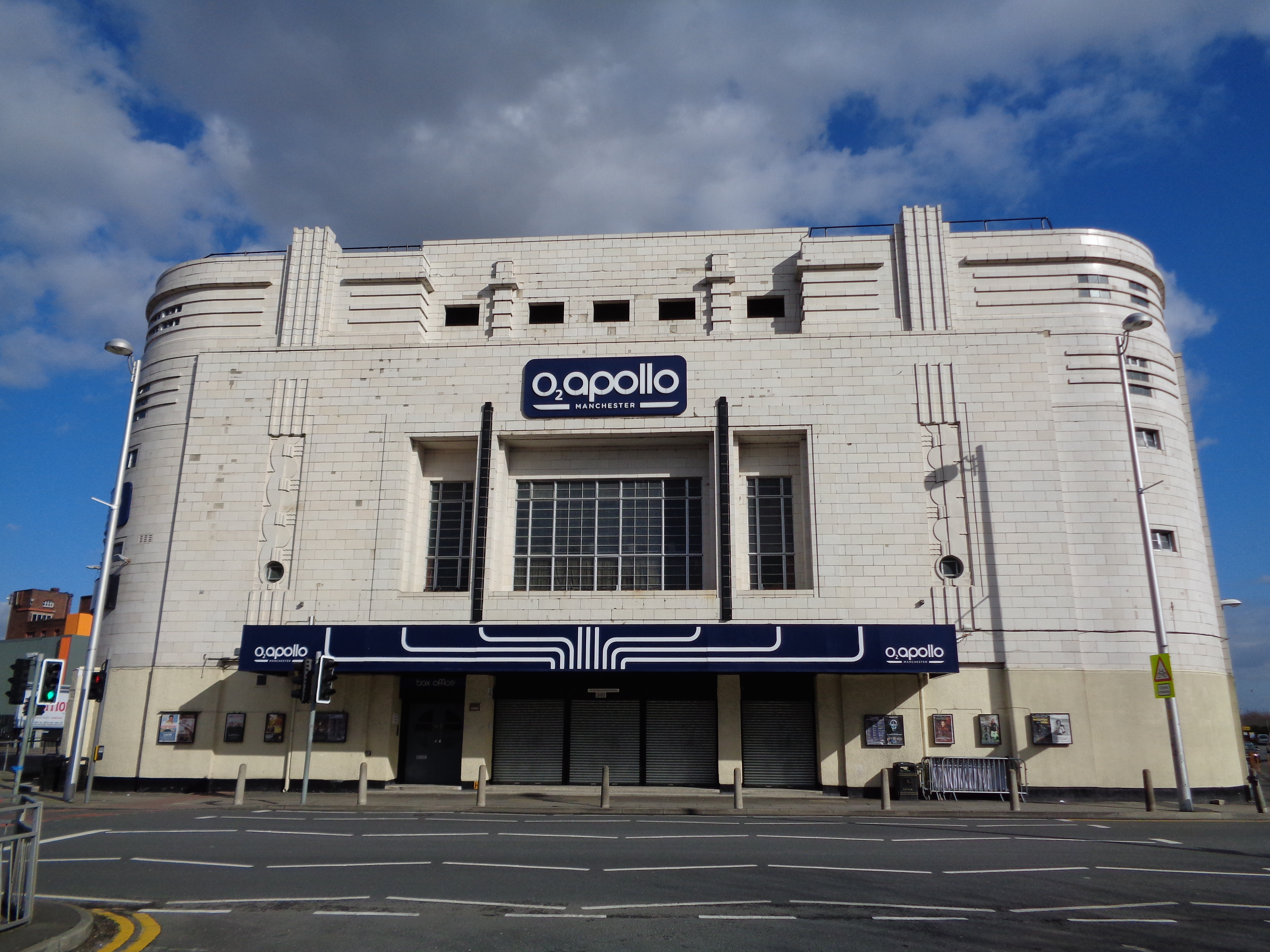
- Façade of O_{2} Apollo Manchester, 2015
- Former names: Apollo Theatre (1938–1962; 2010); ABC Ardwick (1962–1977); Manchester Apollo (1977–1994; 1999–2003); Labatts Apollo (1994–1998); Carling Apollo Manchester (2003–2010)
- Address: Stockport Road, Ardwick Green, Manchester, M12 6AP, England
- Operator: Live Nation
- Capacity: 3,500, (2,693 when fully seated)

Construction
- Opened: 29 August 1938
- Architects: Peter Cummings; Alex Irvine; R. Gillespie Williams

Website
- academymusicgroup.com/o2apollomanchester/

Listed Building – Grade II
- Official name: Apollo Theatre
- Designated: 5 June 1994
- Reference no.: 1254683

The O_{2} Apollo Manchester (known locally as The Apollo and formerly Manchester Apollo and ABC Ardwick) is a concert venue in Ardwick Green, Manchester, England. It is a Grade II listed building, with a capacity of 3,500 (2,514 standing, 986 seats).

== History ==
The building was designed by architects Peter Cummings, Alex Irvine, and R. Gillespie Williams, in an Art Deco style. The building's frontage consists of a glazed white terracotta façade. Its original purpose was as a multi-purpose cinema and variety hall and was opened on 29 August 1938 by actress Margaret Lockwood.

It was taken over by Associated British Cinemas in 1943, but it began to host pop concerts in the 1960s. The Beatles performed at two shows at the ABC Ardwick on 20 November 1963 which were filmed, in colour. They performed here again on 7 December 1965.

The Rolling Stones performed at the ABC Ardwick with Ike & Tina Turner, The Yardbirds, and Peter Jay & the New Jaywalkers on 28 September 1966.

In the 1970s, it stopped presenting films and became solely a concert venue.

It also hosts seated events to a capacity of 2,693. Split into two levels, the upstairs contains permanently fitted seating, whereas the larger downstairs can be altered to suit the event; both levels view a single concert stage. The venue has no air-conditioning except in the "Whiteroom" hospitality area.

It was the biggest venue in Manchester before the GMEX in 1986, and then the 23,000 capacity (formerly 21,000 capacity) NYNEX Arena, now AO Arena, opened in 1995. The largest venue in Manchester is now the Co-op Live Arena with a capacity of 23,500.

The venue hosts a large number of popular music-based concerts and other events throughout the year.

Concert management and advertisement is handled by Live Nation, merchandise is sold by the permanent resident concession company CMI Ltd, and first aid cover for all events is provided by St. John Ambulance.

In September 2010, the venue was rebranded as the O_{2} Apollo Manchester, following a sponsorship deal with O_{2}.

== See also ==
- Listed buildings in Manchester-M12
