= George Noel Hill =

British architect (1893–1985)

George Noel Hill FRIBA, MTPI
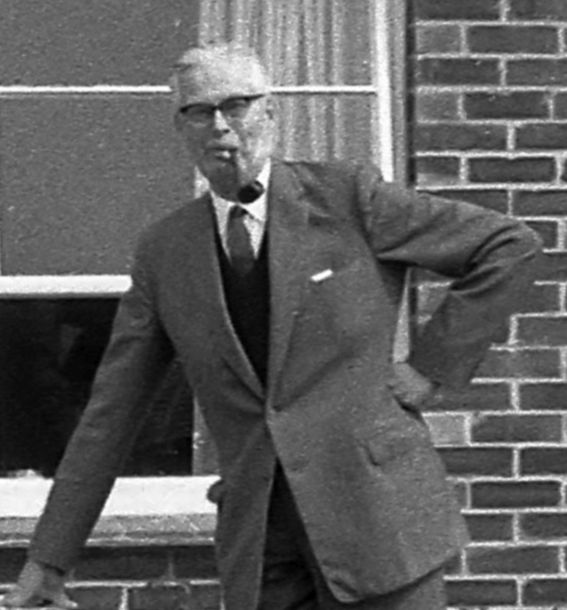
- Hill in the 1960s
- Born: 1893; Wallasey, England
- Died: 1985 (aged 91–92); Bournemouth, England
- Education: King William's College; University of Liverpool School of Architecture
- Occupation: Architect
- Years active: 1912–1958
- Known for: Manchester City Architect
- Spouse: Josephine Shepherd Wharton
- Children: George Wharton Hill
- Parents: George Hammond Hill (father); Annie Edith Thwaite (mother)
- Relatives: Thomas Hill (great uncle); Jonathan Hill (grandson)
- Practice: Leicester Corporation; Manchester Corporation; Lancashire County
- Buildings: Leicester City Police Headquarters; Manchester City Police Headquarters; Wythenshawe Bus Garage
- Projects: Manchester Central Library; Manchester Town Hall Extension; Ringway Airport

George Noel Hill FRIBA, MTPI (1893–1985) was a British architect. He served as City Architect of Manchester and later as Lancashire County Architect.

Hill was born in Wallasey, Merseyside, and educated at King William's College on the Isle of Man. He then proceeded to the School of Architecture at the University of Liverpool.

From 1912 to 1926, Hill worked with three private architectural firms in Liverpool. He also served as a private in the King's Regiment (Liverpool) during the First World War. In 1926 he was appointed senior assistant in the Liverpool City Architect's Department. From 1928 to 1932, he worked as chief architectural assistant in the Leicester Corporation Surveyor's Department. While in Leicester, he designed the Leicester City Police Headquarters (with A. T. Gooseman) and additions to Leicester Town Hall, including a council chamber and a suite for the Lord Mayor of the city.

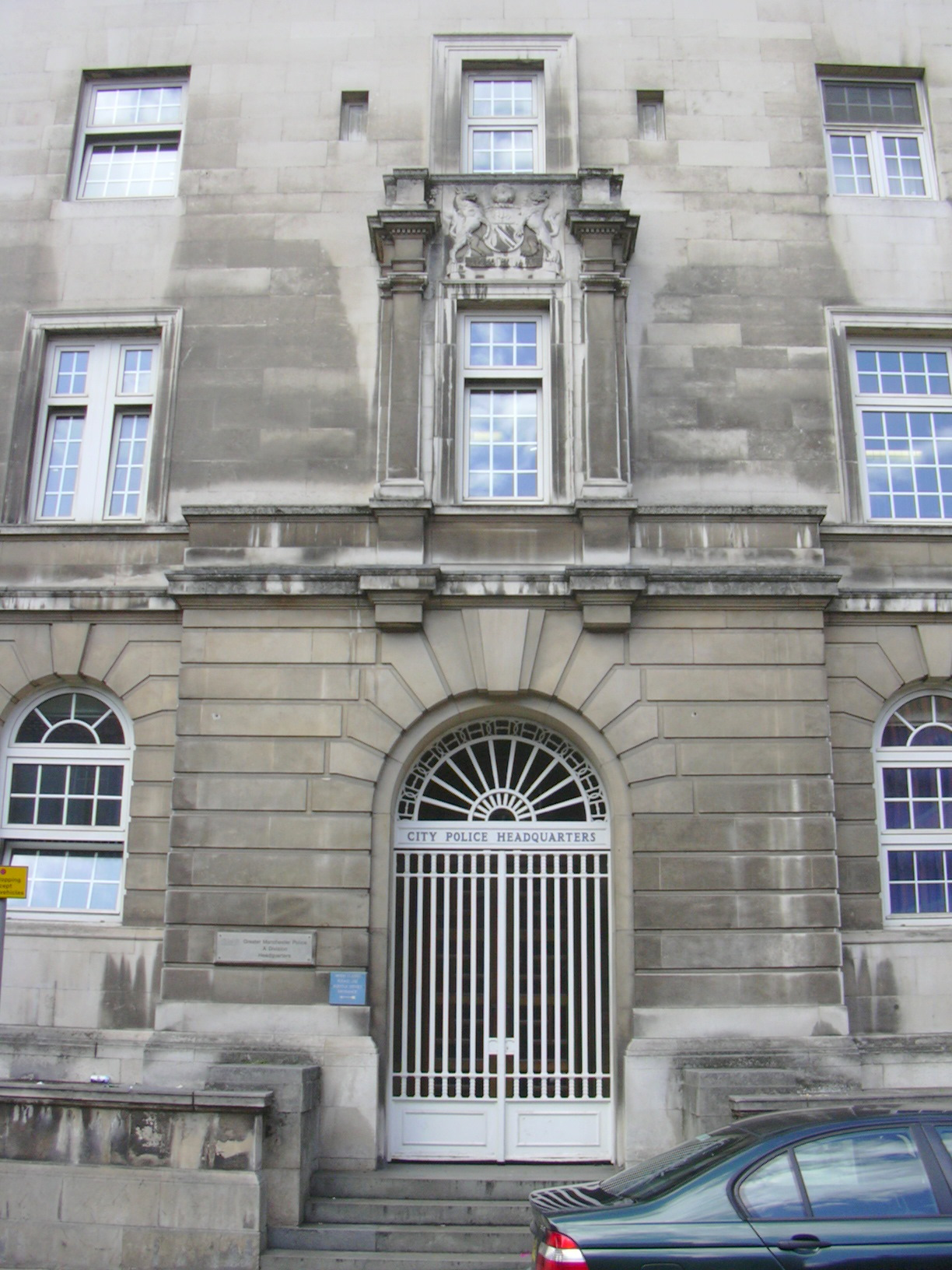
Manchester City Police Headquarters main entrance

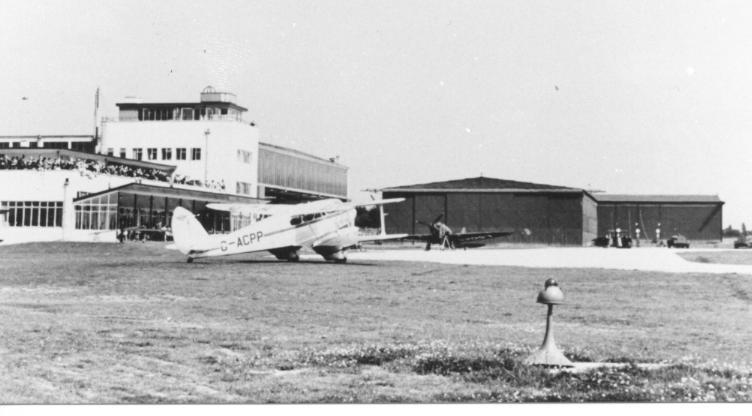
Ringway Airport in the late 1930s

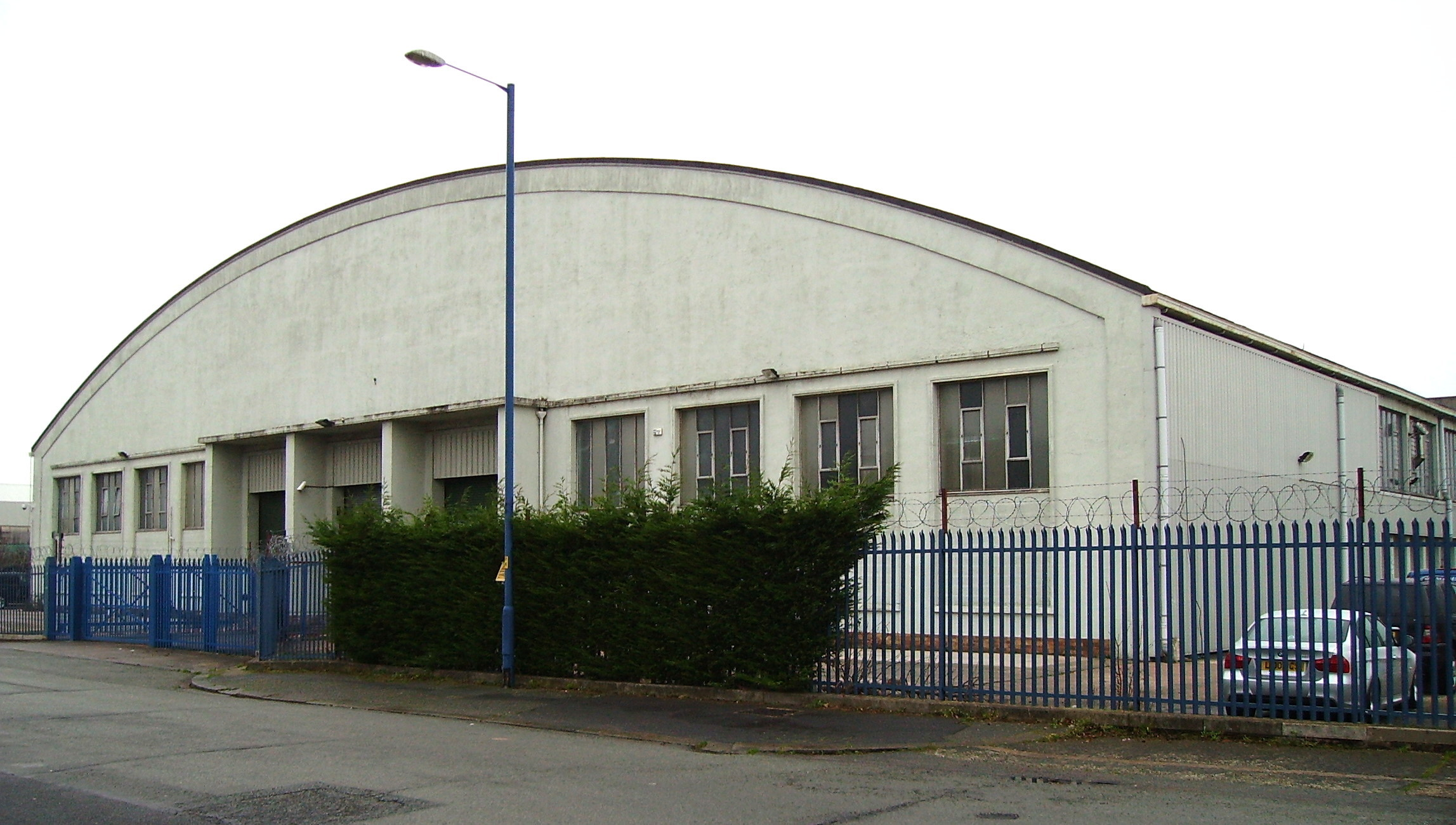
Wythenshawe Bus Garage

Hill then became the second City Architect at Manchester, succeeding Henry Price (1867–1944) on the latter's retirement in August 1932. In this role, he designed the Broadway Baths (1932) in New Moston and a new Manchester City Police Headquarters in Bootle Street (1933–37), with a Portland stone facade. He was involved with the development of Wythenshawe, including the design of the Withington Fire and Police Stations (1931) and the Grade II*-listed Wythenshawe Bus Garage (1939–42), which employed a novel concrete shell. As Manchester City Architect, he also contributed to the new Manchester Central Library (opened 1934) and the Town Hall Extension (opened 1938), both designed by Vincent Harris. In addition, he worked on the Ringway Airport hangar (1937) and other associated buildings (1939), now part of Manchester Airport.

In June 1945, Hill was appointed Lancashire County Architect, a post from which he retired in 1958. In Manchester, he was succeeded as City Architect by Leonard Cecil Howitt.

Hill was elected a Fellow of the Royal Institute of British Architects (RIBA).
