= Manchester Reform Synagogue =

Reform synagogue in central Manchester, England

The Manchester Reform Synagogue is a Reform Jewish congregation based in Central Manchester, England, in the United Kingdom. Its ministers are Rabbi Scott Aaron, Rabbi Warren Elf and Rabbi Emeritus Reuven Silverman. The congregation, founded in 1857 as the Manchester Congregation of British Jews, is one of the oldest Reform communities in the United Kingdom, and is a member of the Movement for Reform Judaism.

The congregation built a synagogue on Jackson's Row in 1953 and vacated the site in 2022. That building was subsequently demolished in 2023. The congregation has been using temporary premises at Manchester University's Chapel on Oxford Road, since November 2022, while it seeks a permanent home.

== History ==
Horatio Michollis, the inaugural president, and Rabbi Solomon Marcus Schiller-Szinessy led a group consisting mainly of German-Jewish immigrants to form the congregation in 1857. It was the second Reform congregation to be established in England and the first outside London.

The first synagogue was completed in 1858, located at Park Place, Cheetham Hill Road. This building was destroyed on 1 June 1941 as a result of bombing raids by the German airforce during the Manchester Blitz.

=== Former synagogue building at Jackson's Row ===
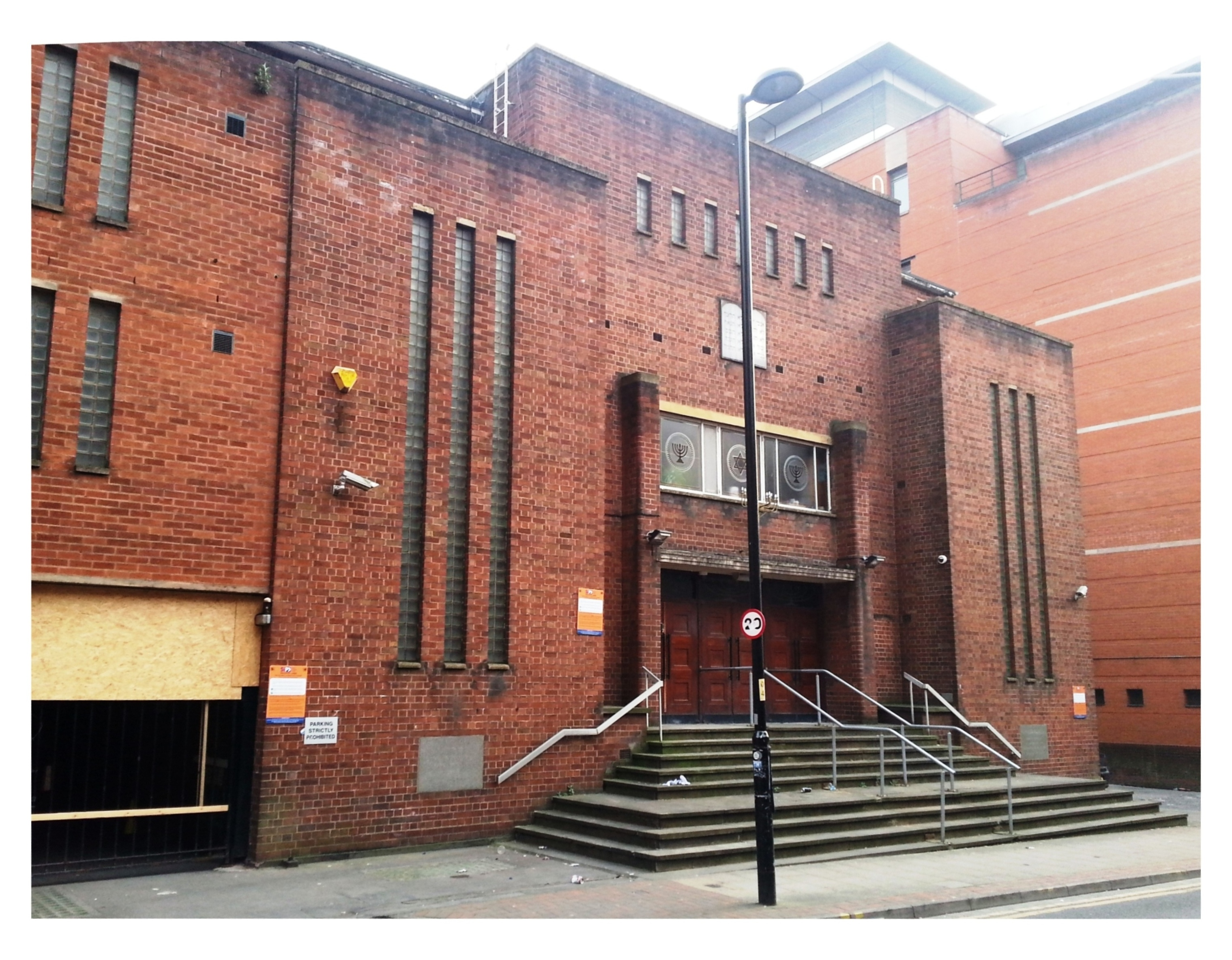
Former synagogue building at Jackson's Row

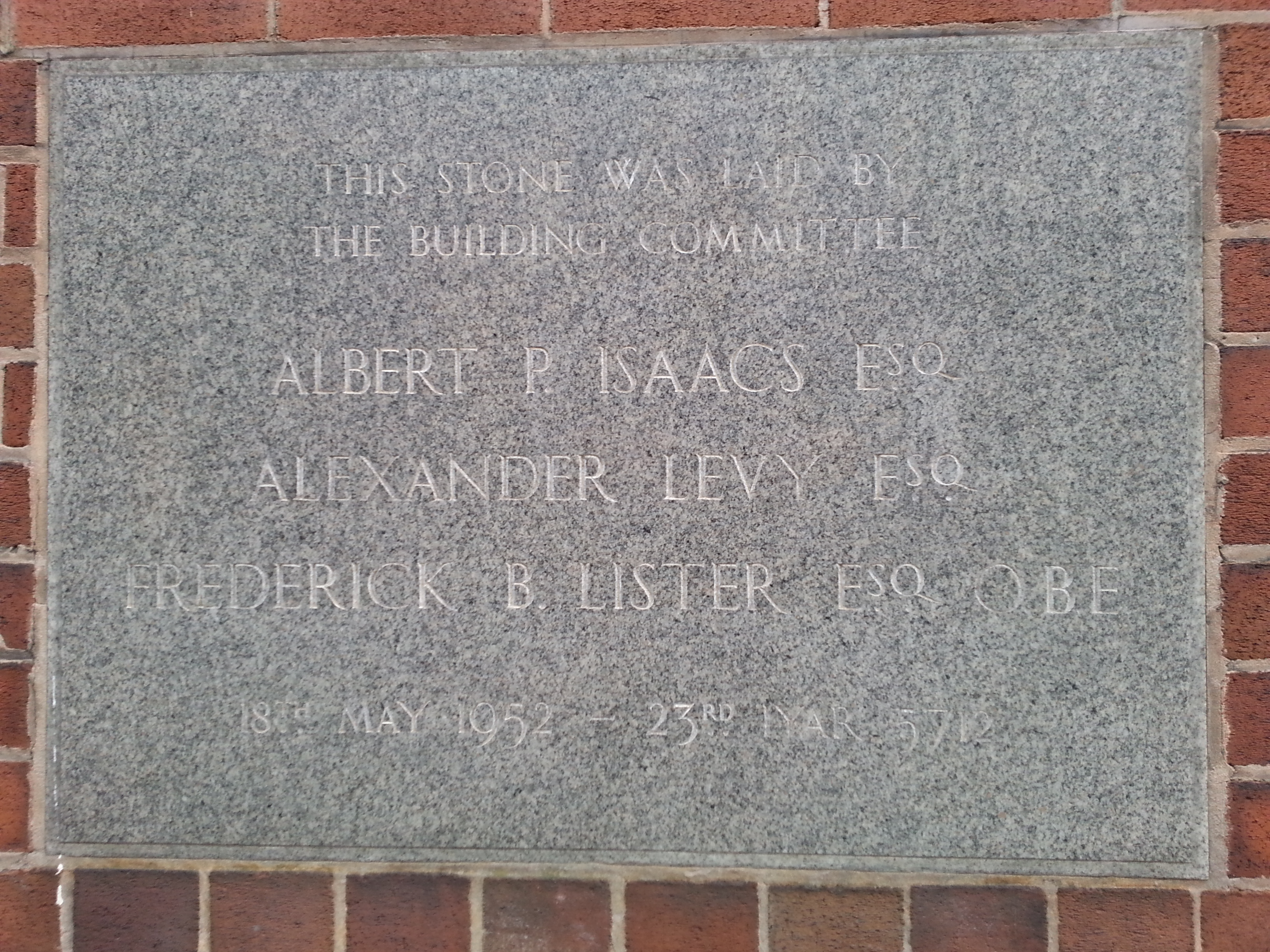
The Jackson's Row building's cornerstone, 1952

In 1949 the congregation bought a site in Jackson's Row for a new synagogue building, financed by money from the War Damage Commission. Albert Isaacs, Alexander Levy, and Frederick Lister laid the cornerstone on 18 May 1952. Designed by Peter Cummings and Eric Levy, the synagogue was consecrated on 28 November 1953. John Bradshaw designed the stained glass windows, which were manufactured by the stained glass company Charles Lightfoot. The building contained a large synagogue, banqueting hall and classrooms.

The building, which had been used as a filming location for the 2021 BBC TV series Ridley Road, closed in late 2022 to make way for the St Michael's redevelopment project. It was demolished on 14 October 2023.

== See also ==
- History of the Jews in England
- List of Jewish communities in the United Kingdom
- List of synagogues in the United Kingdom
