= Manchester City Council =

Local government body in England

- Coat of arms

- Corporate logo

Type
- Type: Metropolitan borough council of Manchester

Leadership
- Lord Mayor: Shaukat Ali, Labour since 20 May 2026
- Leader: Garry Bridges, Labour since 3 September 2026
- Chief Executive: Tom Stannard since February 2025

Structure
- Seats: 96 councillors
- Graph of the party split among 96 seats.
- Political groups: Administration (63) Labour (63) Other parties (32) Green (21) Reform (7) Liberal Democrats (4) Vacancy (1) Vacant (1)
- Joint committees: Greater Manchester Combined Authority; Greater Manchester Police, Fire and Crime Panel
- Length of term: 4 years

Elections
- Voting system: First-past-the-post
- Last election: 7 May 2026
- Next election: 6 May 2027

Motto
- Latin: Concilio Et Labore, lit. 'By Wisdom and Effort'

Meeting place
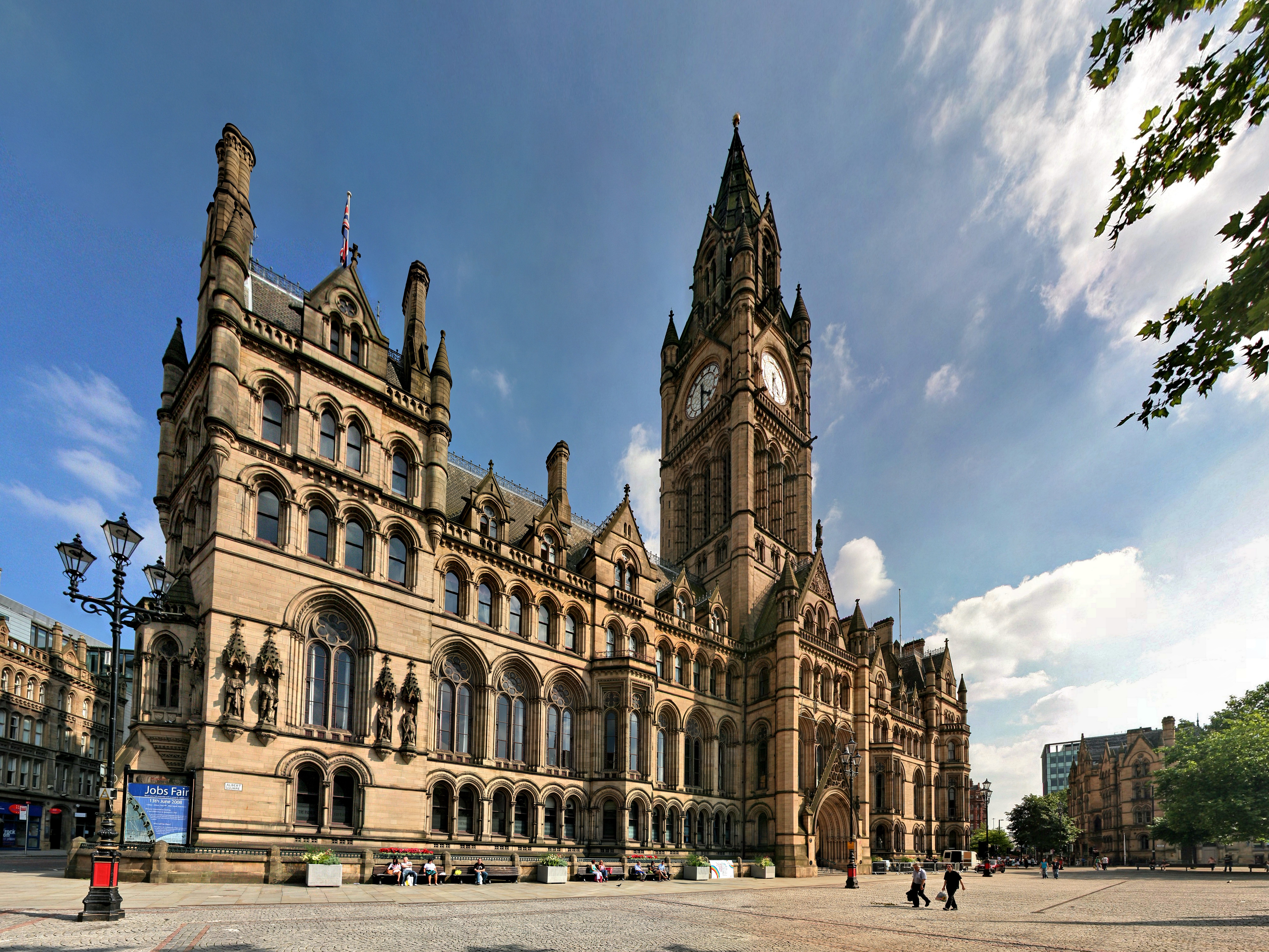
- Town Hall, Albert Square, Manchester, M60 2LA

Website
- manchester.gov.uk

Manchester City Council is the local authority for the city of Manchester in Greater Manchester, England. Manchester has had an elected local authority since 1838, which has been reformed several times. Since 1974 the council has been a metropolitan borough council. It provides the majority of local government services in the city. The council has been a member of the Greater Manchester Combined Authority since 2011.

The council has been under Labour majority control since 1971. It is based at Manchester Town Hall.

== History ==
Manchester had been governed as a borough in the 13th and 14th centuries, but its borough status was not supported by a royal charter. An inquiry in 1359 ruled that it was only a market town, not a borough. It was then governed by manorial courts and the parish vestry until the 18th century.

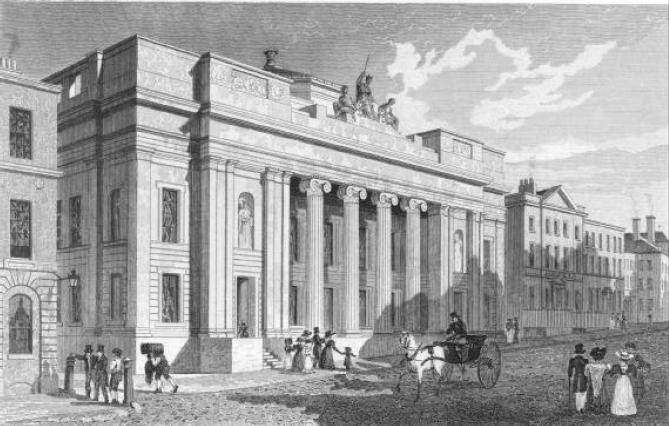
Old Town Hall, King Street: Completed 1825 for the Police Commissioners, subsequently served as council's headquarters until 1877

In 1792 a body of improvement commissioners known as the Manchester Police Commissioners was established to provide services in the rapidly growing town. In 1838 the town was incorporated as a municipal borough, after which it was governed by a town council body formally called the 'Mayor, aldermen and burgesses of the borough of Manchester', but mostly known as the Manchester Corporation. The police commissioners were disbanded in 1843 and their functions passed to the corporation.

Manchester was granted city status in 1853, only the second such grant since the Reformation. After that the corporation was also known as the city council. When elected county councils were established in 1889, Manchester was considered large enough for its existing council to provide county-level services, and so it became a county borough, independent from the new Lancashire County Council, whilst remaining part of the geographical county of Lancashire. In 1885, Bradford, Harpurhey, Rusholme and parts of Moss Side and Withington townships became part of the City of Manchester. In 1889, the city became a county borough, as did many larger Lancashire towns, and therefore not governed by Lancashire County Council. Between 1890 and 1933, more areas were added to the city, including former villages such as Burnage, Chorlton-cum-Hardy, Didsbury, Fallowfield, Levenshulme, Longsight, and Withington. In 1931, the civil parishes of Baguley, Northenden and Northen Etchells from the south of the River Mersey were added. In 1974, by way of the Local Government Act 1972, the City of Manchester became a metropolitan district of the metropolitan county of Greater Manchester. That year, Ringway, the village where Manchester Airport is located, was added to the city. The mayor was granted the title of lord mayor in 1893.

Henry Price (1867–1944) was appointed as the first City Architect of Manchester in 1902. He was succeeded in 1932 by George Noel Hill (1893–1985).

The county borough was abolished in 1974 under the Local Government Act 1972, being replaced by a metropolitan district of Manchester, covering the area of the old county borough plus the parish of Ringway. The new district was one of ten metropolitan districts within the new metropolitan county of Greater Manchester. Manchester's borough and city statuses and its lord mayoralty passed to the new district and its council.

In 1980, Manchester was the first council to declare itself a nuclear-free zone. In 1984 it formed an equal opportunities unit as part of its opposition to Section 28.

From 1974 until 1986 the council was a lower-tier authority, with upper-tier functions provided by the Greater Manchester County Council. The county council was abolished in 1986 and its functions passed to Greater Manchester's ten borough councils, including Manchester City Council, with some services provided through joint committees.

Since 2011 the council has been a member of the Greater Manchester Combined Authority, which has been led by the directly elected Mayor of Greater Manchester since 2017. The combined authority provides strategic leadership and co-ordination for certain functions across Greater Manchester, notably regarding transport and town planning, but Manchester City Council continues to be responsible for most local government functions.

== Governance ==
Manchester City Council provides metropolitan borough services. Some strategic functions in the area are provided by the Greater Manchester Combined Authority; the leader of the city council sits on the combined authority as Manchester's representative. There is one civil parish in the city at Ringway, with a parish council; the rest of the city is unparished.

=== Political control ===
The council has been under Labour majority control since 1971.

Borough Corporation

Party	Period
Liberal	1838–1886
No overall control	1886–1908
Conservative	1908–1919
No overall control	1919–1921
Conservative	1921–1926
No overall control	1926–1932
Conservative	1932–1934
No overall control	1934–1946
Labour	1946–1947
No overall control	1947–1949
Conservative	1949–1952
No overall control	1952–1953
Labour	1953–1967
Conservative	1967–1971
Labour	1971–1974

Metropolitan Borough

Since the 1974 reforms, Labour has always held a majority of the seats on the council.

Party	Period
Labour	1974–present

=== Leadership ===
The role of Lord Mayor of Manchester is largely ceremonial. Political leadership is instead provided by the leader of the council. The leaders since 1945 have been:

County Borough

Councillor	Party	From	To
George Titt	Labour	2 Nov 1945	8 Nov 1946
Tom Nally	Labour	8 Nov 1946	May 1949
William Jackson	Conservative	May 1949	1953
Tom Nally	Labour	1953	20 Dec 1956
Bob Thomas	Labour	1957	May 1962
Maurice Pariser	Labour	May 1962	Oct 1965
Bob Thomas	Labour	3 Nov 1965	May 1967
Robert Rodgers	Conservative	May 1967	May 1970
Arnold Fieldhouse	Conservative	May 1970	May 1971
Bob Thomas	Labour	May 1971	Jun 1973
Joe Dean	Labour	Jun 1973	31 Mar 1974

Metropolitan Borough

Councillor	Party	From	To
Joe Dean	Labour	1 Apr 1974	21 May 1974
Norman Morris	Labour	21 May 1974	May 1982
Bill Egerton	Labour	May 1982	May 1984
Graham Stringer	Labour	May 1984	May 1996
Richard Leese	Labour	May 1996	1 Dec 2021
Bev Craig	Labour	1 Dec 2021	3 Aug 2026
Garry Bridges	Labour	3 Sep 2026	

=== Composition ===
Following the May 2026 election, and subsequent by-elections and changes up to September 2026, the composition of the council was:

Party	Seats
Labour	64
Green	21
Reform	7
Liberal Democrats	4
Total	96

The next election is due in May 2027.

== Elections ==
Since the last boundary changes in 2018, the council has comprised 96 councillors representing 32 wards, with each ward electing three councillors. Elections are held three years out of every four, with a third of the council (one councillor for each ward) elected each time for a four-year term of office.

== Wards ==
The council wards are listed under their parliamentary constituency below:

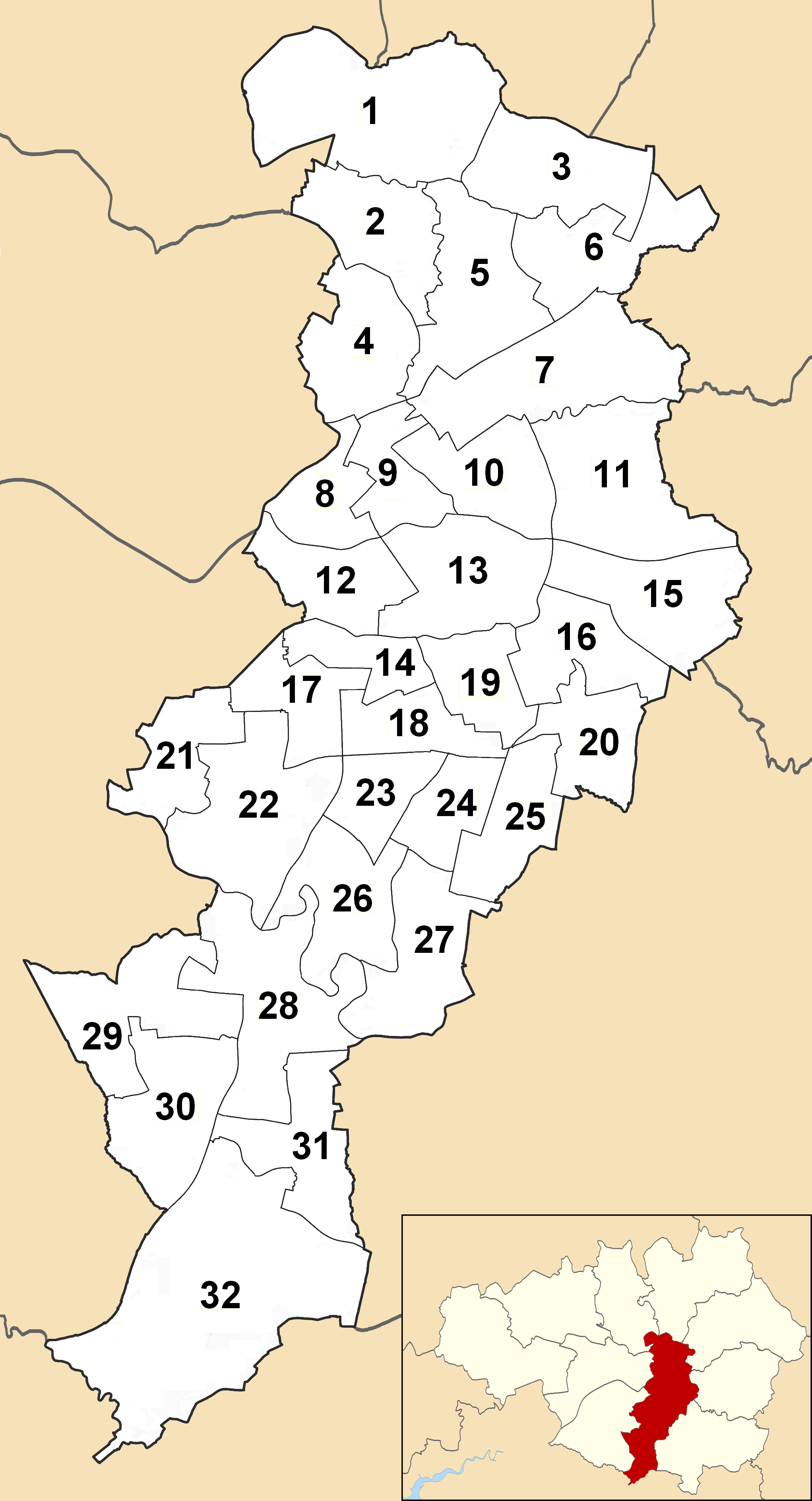
Wards within Manchester City Council

Blackley and Middleton South	Gorton and Denton	Manchester Central
1. Higher Blackley; 2. Crumpsall; 3. Charlestown; 5. Harpurhey; 6. Moston; This constituency also contains: Rochdale Council wards; East Middleton; South Middleton	15. Gorton and Abbey Hey; 16. Longsight; 20. Levenshulme; 25. Burnage; This constituency also contains: Tameside Council wards; Denton North East; Denton South; Denton West	4. Cheetham; 7. Miles Platting & Newton Heath; 8. Deansgate; 9. Piccadilly; 10. Ancoats and Beswick; 11. Clayton and Openshaw; This constituency also contains: Oldham Council wards; Failsworth East; Failsworth West
Manchester Rusholme	Manchester Withington	Wythenshawe and Sale East
12. Hulme; 13. Ardwick; 14. Moss Side; 17. Whalley Range; 18. Fallowfield; 19. Rusholme	21. Chorlton; 22. Chorlton Park; 23. Old Moat; 24. Withington; 26. Didsbury West; 27. Didsbury East	28. Northenden; 29. Brooklands (Manchester); 30. Baguley; 31. Sharston; 32. Woodhouse Park; This constituency also contains: Trafford Council wards; Brooklands (Trafford); Priory; Sale Moor

=== Councillors ===
Each ward is represented by three councillors.

Parliamentary constituency	Ward	Councillor	Party	Term of office
Blackley and Middleton South constituency	Charlestown	Basil Curley	Labour	2023–27
Blackley and Middleton South constituency	Charlestown	Umza Jafri	Labour	2024–28
Blackley and Middleton South constituency	Charlestown	Dylan Evans	Reform	2026–30
Blackley and Middleton South constituency	Crumpsall	Fiaz Riasat	Labour	2023–27
Blackley and Middleton South constituency	Crumpsall	Nasrin Ali	Labour	2024–28
Blackley and Middleton South constituency	Crumpsall	Jawad Amin	Labour	2026–30
Blackley and Middleton South constituency	Harpurhey	Pat Karney	Labour	2023–27
Blackley and Middleton South constituency	Harpurhey	Joanne Green	Labour	2024–28
Blackley and Middleton South constituency	Harpurhey	David Godfrey	Labour	2026–30
Blackley and Middleton South constituency	Higher Blackley	Paula Sadler	Labour	2023–27
Blackley and Middleton South constituency	Higher Blackley	Julie Connolly	Labour	2024–28
Blackley and Middleton South constituency	Higher Blackley	Martin Power	Reform	2026–30
Blackley and Middleton South constituency	Moston	Yasmine Dar	Labour	2023–27
Blackley and Middleton South constituency	Moston	Sherita Mandongwe	Labour	2024–28
Blackley and Middleton South constituency	Moston	Blake Fisher	Reform	2026–30
Gorton and Denton constituency	Burnage	Azra Ali	Labour	2023–27
Gorton and Denton constituency	Burnage	Vacant		2026–28
Gorton and Denton constituency	Burnage	Asma Alam	Green	2026–30
Gorton and Denton constituency	Gorton and Abbey Hey	Afia Kamal	Labour	2023–27
Gorton and Denton constituency	Gorton and Abbey Hey	Julie Reid	Labour	2024–28
Gorton and Denton constituency	Gorton and Abbey Hey	Chris Ogden	Green	2026–30
Gorton and Denton constituency	Levenshulme	Basat Sheikh	Labour	2023–27
Gorton and Denton constituency	Levenshulme	Zahid Hussain	Labour	2024–28
Gorton and Denton constituency	Levenshulme	Fesl Reza-Khan	Green	2026–30
Gorton and Denton constituency	Longsight	Suzanne Richards	Labour	2023–27
Gorton and Denton constituency	Longsight	Shahbaz Sarwar	Labour^{[a]}	2024–28
Gorton and Denton constituency	Longsight	Asif Ranjha	Green	2026–30
Manchester Central constituency	Ancoats and Beswick	Chris Northwood	Liberal Democrats	2023–27
Manchester Central constituency	Ancoats and Beswick	Alan Good	Liberal Democrats	2024–28
Manchester Central constituency	Ancoats and Beswick	Hussayn Salem	Green	2026–30
Manchester Central constituency	Cheetham	Shazia Butt	Labour	2023–27
Manchester Central constituency	Cheetham	Shaukat Ali	Labour	2024–28
Manchester Central constituency	Cheetham	Naeem Hassan	Labour	2026–30
Manchester Central constituency	Clayton and Openshaw	Sean McHale	Labour	2023–27
Manchester Central constituency	Clayton and Openshaw	Donna Ludford	Labour	2024–28
Manchester Central constituency	Clayton and Openshaw	Thomas Robinson	Labour	2026–30
Manchester Central constituency	Deansgate	Anthony McCaul	Labour Co-op	2023–27
Manchester Central constituency	Deansgate	Marcus Johns	Labour Co-op	2024–28
Manchester Central constituency	Deansgate	Sarah Wakefield	Green	2026–30
Manchester Central constituency	Miles Platting and Newton Heath	John Flanagan	Labour	2023–27
Manchester Central constituency	Miles Platting and Newton Heath	June Hitchin	Labour	2024–28
Manchester Central constituency	Miles Platting and Newton Heath	Tom Lane	Reform	2026–30
Manchester Central constituency	Piccadilly	Sam Wheeler	Labour	2023–27
Manchester Central constituency	Piccadilly	Jon-Connor Lyons	Labour	2024–28
Manchester Central constituency	Piccadilly	Ross Steven	Green	2026–30
Manchester Rusholme constituency	Ardwick	Amna Abdullatif	Green^{[b]}	2023–27
Manchester Rusholme constituency	Ardwick	Abdigafar Muse	Labour	2024–28
Manchester Rusholme constituency	Ardwick	Alex-Salik Imran	Green	2026–30
Manchester Rusholme constituency	Fallowfield	Jade Doswell	Labour	2023–27
Manchester Rusholme constituency	Fallowfield	Ghazala Sadiq	Labour	2024–28
Manchester Rusholme constituency	Fallowfield	Sufyaan Jasat	Green	2026–30
Manchester Rusholme constituency	Hulme	Annette Wright	Labour	2023–27
Manchester Rusholme constituency	Hulme	Lee Glover	Labour	2024–28
Manchester Rusholme constituency	Hulme	Bernard Ekbery	Green	2026–30
Manchester Rusholme constituency	Moss Side	Mahadi Hussein Sharif Mahamed	Labour	2023–27
Manchester Rusholme constituency	Moss Side	Esha Mumtaz	Labour	2024–28
Manchester Rusholme constituency	Moss Side	Thirza Asanga-Rae	Green	2026–30
Manchester Rusholme constituency	Rusholme	Ahmed Ali	Labour	2023–27
Manchester Rusholme constituency	Rusholme	Jill Lovecy	Labour	2024–28
Manchester Rusholme constituency	Rusholme	Shams Syed	Green	2026–30
Manchester Rusholme constituency	Whalley Range	Angeliki Stogia	Labour Co-op	2023–27
Manchester Rusholme constituency	Whalley Range	Muqaddasah Bano	Labour	2024–28
Manchester Rusholme constituency	Whalley Range	Ati Zafar	Green	2026–30
Manchester Withington constituency	Chorlton	Mathew Benham	Labour	2023–27
Manchester Withington constituency	Chorlton	Tina Kirwin-McGinley	Labour	2024–28
Manchester Withington constituency	Chorlton	Chantal Kerr-Sheppard	Green	2026–30
Manchester Withington constituency	Chorlton Park	Dave Rawson	Labour	2023–27
Manchester Withington constituency	Chorlton Park	Mandie Shilton-Goodwin	Labour Co-op	2024–28
Manchester Withington constituency	Chorlton Park	Grace Worrall	Green	2026–30
Manchester Withington constituency	Didsbury East	Leslie Bell	Labour	2024–27^{[c]}
Manchester Withington constituency	Didsbury East	Linda Foley	Labour	2024–28
Manchester Withington constituency	Didsbury East	Andrew Simcock	Labour Co-op	2026–30
Manchester Withington constituency	Didsbury West	Richard Kilpatrick	Liberal Democrats	2023–27
Manchester Withington constituency	Didsbury West	Debbie Hilal	Labour	2024–28
Manchester Withington constituency	Didsbury West	John Leech	Liberal Democrats	2026–30
Manchester Withington constituency	Old Moat	Garry Bridges	Labour	2023–27
Manchester Withington constituency	Old Moat	Gavin White	Labour	2024–28
Manchester Withington constituency	Old Moat	Sam Easterby-Smith	Green	2026–30
Manchester Withington constituency	Withington	Becky Chambers	Labour	2023–27
Manchester Withington constituency	Withington	Chris Wills	Labour Co-op	2024–28
Manchester Withington constituency	Withington	Beth Hartness	Green	2026–30
Wythenshawe and Sale East constituency	Baguley	Munaver Rasul	Labour	2024–27
Wythenshawe and Sale East constituency	Baguley	Tracy Rawlins	Labour Co-op	2024–28
Wythenshawe and Sale East constituency	Baguley	Sian Astley	Reform	2026–30
Wythenshawe and Sale East constituency	Brooklands	Glynn Evans	Labour	2023–27
Wythenshawe and Sale East constituency	Brooklands	Dave Marsh	Labour	2024–28
Wythenshawe and Sale East constituency	Brooklands	Steven Hodgkiss	Reform	2026–30
Wythenshawe and Sale East constituency	Northenden	Richard Fletcher	Labour	2023–27
Wythenshawe and Sale East constituency	Northenden	Sam Lynch	Labour	2024–28
Wythenshawe and Sale East constituency	Northenden	Angela Moran	Labour	2026–30
Wythenshawe and Sale East constituency	Sharston	Tim Whiston	Labour Co-op	2023–27
Wythenshawe and Sale East constituency	Sharston	Emma Taylor	Labour	2024–28
Wythenshawe and Sale East constituency	Sharston	David McCullough	Reform	2026–30
Wythenshawe and Sale East constituency	Woodhouse Park	Zoe Marlow	Green	2025–27
Wythenshawe and Sale East constituency	Woodhouse Park	Rob Nunney	Green	2024–28
Wythenshawe and Sale East constituency	Woodhouse Park	Astrid Johnson	Green	2026–30

^a Elected as Worker's Party but joined Labour in July, 2026.

^b Elected as Labour but resigned from the party in the wake of the Labour leadership's stance on the Israeli invasion of Gaza in October, 2023. Joined the Green Party in April, 2026, after serving as an independent initially.

^c Elected during the 2024 election to fill a vacancy caused by the resignation of James Wilson, who was elected in 2023.

== Premises ==
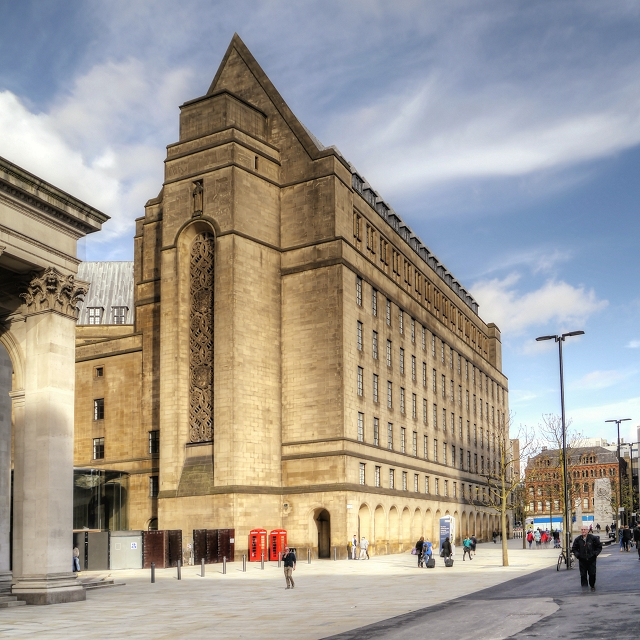
Town Hall Extension

The council is based at Manchester Town Hall on Albert Square, completed in 1877, and the adjoining Town Hall Extension on the opposite side of Lloyd Street, which was completed in 1938 and is linked to the older building by first floor bridges. The main Town Hall has been under refurbishment since 2020, due to reopen in spring 2027. The council continues to operate from the Town Hall Extension.

== Coat of arms ==
Gules, three bendlets enhanced Or; a chief argent, thereon on waves of the sea a ship under sail proper. On a wreath of colours, a terrestrial globe semée of bees volant, all proper. On the dexter side a heraldic antelope argent, attired, and chain reflexed over the back Or, and on the sinister side a lion guardant Or, murally crowned Gules; each charged on the shoulder with a rose of the last. Motto: "Concilio et Labore".

A coat of arms was granted to the Manchester Corporation in 1842, passing on to Manchester City Council when the borough of Manchester was granted the title of city in 1853.

- The Shield: red (Gules) with three gold (Or) bands drawn diagonally across to the right-hand side.
- The Chief (the white (Argent) top segment): shows a ship at sea in full sail. This is a reference to the city's trading base.
- The Crest: On a multicoloured wreath stands a terrestrial globe, signifying Manchester's world trade, and covered by a swarm of flying bees. The bee was adopted in the 19th century as a symbol of industrial Manchester being the birthplace of the Industrial Revolution.
- The Supporters: On the left, a heraldic antelope with a chain attached to a gold (Or) collar, representing engineering industries, and hanging at the shoulder, the red rose of Lancashire, reflecting Manchester's historic position in Lancashire. On the right, a golden lion stands guardant (facing us), crowned with a red (Gules) castle (a reference to the Roman fort at Castlefield from which the city originated). The lion also wears the Red Rose of Lancashire.
- Motto: Concilio et Labore, loosely translated "By wisdom and effort" (or "By counsel and hard work").

In 1954, Manchester Corporation successfully took the Manchester Palace of Varieties to court for improperly using the corporation's arms in its internal decoration and its company seal. The case, Manchester Corporation v Manchester Palace of Varieties Ltd, occasioned the first sitting of the High Court of Chivalry for two hundred years; it has not sat since.

In April 2013, Manchester City Council threatened to take legal action against The Manchester Gazette for its use of the city's coat of arms on its website. The news outlet claimed it had previously gained permission, and continued to use the arms for a further 8 months, despite receiving warnings of potential legal action. It ceased to use the arms later that year.
