= List of acts of the Parliament of the United Kingdom from 1966 =

This is a list of acts of the Parliament of the United Kingdom passed in 1966.

Acts passed since 1963 are cited by calendar year, as opposed to the convention used for earlier acts of citing the regnal year(s) in which the relevant parliamentary session was held. Each act passed in a respective year is given a chapter number (abbreviated "c."), denoted by Arabic numerals in the case of public general acts, lowercase Roman numerals in the case of local acts, or italicised Arabic numerals in the case of personal acts. These run as separate series.

93 acts of Parliament were passed in 1966: 52 public general acts and 41 local acts.

indicates that an act has been transcribed on Wikisource, indicates that an act is available to view at legislation.gov.uk, and indicates the location of the original act in the Parliamentary Archives.

== Public general acts ==
| Short title | Citation | Royal assent |
Long title
| Consolidated Fund Act 1966 (repealed) | 1966 c. 1 | 24 February 1966 |
An Act to apply a sum out of the Consolidated Fund to the service of the year ending on 31st March 1966. (Repealed by Statute Law (Repeals) Act 1971 (c. 52))
| Church of England Convocations Act 1966 | 1966 c. 2 | 24 February 1966 |
An Act to make further provision with respect to the duration of the Convocations of the provinces of Canterbury and York.
| Appropriation Act 1966 (repealed) | 1966 c. 3 | 10 March 1966 |
An Act to apply certain sums out of the Consolidated Fund to the service of the years ending on 31st March 1965, 1966 and 1967, and to appropriate the supplies granted in this Session of Parliament. (Repealed by Statute Law (Repeals) Act 1971 (c. 52))
| Mines (Working Facilities and Support) Act 1966 | 1966 c. 4 | 10 March 1966 |
An Act to consolidate Part I of the Mines (Working Facilities and Support) Act 1923 (Note: Mines (Working Facilities and Support) Act 1923 (13 & 14 Geo. 5. c. 20)) and certain enactments amending the said Part I.
| Statute Law Revision Act 1966 (repealed) | 1966 c. 5 | 10 March 1966 |
An Act to revise the statute law by repealing obsolete, spent, unnecessary or superseded enactments. (Repealed by Statute Law (Repeals) Act 1974 (c. 22))
| National Insurance Act 1966 | 1966 c. 6 | 10 March 1966 |
An Act to make provision for the payment under the National Insurance Act 1965 (Note: National Insurance Act 1965 (c. 51)) of earnings-related benefit by way of increases of unemployment benefit, sickness benefit and widow's allowance; to make other amendments of that Act and of the National Insurance (Industrial Injuries) Act 1965; (Note: National Insurance (Industrial Injuries) Act 1965 (c. 52)) and for connected purposes.
| Local Government (Pecuniary Interests) (Scotland) Act 1966 (repealed) | 1966 c. 7 | 10 March 1966 |
An Act to amend sections 73 and 102 of the Local Government (Scotland) Act 1947. (Note: Local Government (Scotland) Act 1947 (10 & 11 Geo. 6. c. 43)) (Repealed by Statute Law (Repeals) Act 1975 (c. 10))
| National Health Service Act 1966 | 1966 c. 8 | 10 March 1966 |
An Act to facilitate the financing of premises and equipment used by practitioners providing general medical services; to modify the prohibition of full-time salaries for practitioners providing general medical services; and for purposes connected therewith.
| Rating Act 1966 (repealed) | 1966 c. 9 | 10 March 1966 |
An Act to make provision for the payment by instalments of rates on dwellings and for the granting of rebates in respect of such rates; and for connected purposes. (Repealed by Statute Law (Repeals) Act 1986 (c. 12))
| Commonwealth Secretariat Act 1966 | 1966 c. 10 | 10 March 1966 |
An Act to make provision with respect to the Commonwealth Secretariat; and for connected purposes.
| Air Corporations Act 1966 (repealed) | 1966 c. 11 | 10 March 1966 |
An Act to provide for the capital reconstruction of the British Overseas Airways Corporation; to provide for Exchequer investment in that Corporation otherwise than by way of loan; to amend the financial duties and borrowing powers of that Corporation and of the British European Airways Corporation; to enable the Treasury to guarantee foreign currency debts of those Corporations; and to amend sections 21 and 23 of, and paragraphs 9 and 10 of Schedule 1 to, the Air Corporations Act 1949. (Note: Air Corporations Act 1949 (12, 13 & 14 Geo. 6. c. 91)) (Repealed by Statute Law (Repeals) Act 2004 (c. 14))
| Post Office Savings Bank Act 1966 (repealed) | 1966 c. 12 | 10 March 1966 |
An Act to enable deposits in a post office savings bank to be received for investment in securities, and at rates of interest, other than those authorised by the Post Office Savings Bank Act 1954; (Note: Post Office Savings Bank Act 1954 (2 & 3 Eliz. 2. c. 62)) to amend the provisions of that Act as to the making and receipt of deposits; and for purposes connected with those matters. (Repealed by National Savings Bank Act 1971 (c. 29))
| Universities (Scotland) Act 1966 | 1966 c. 13 | 10 March 1966 |
An Act to amend the law relating to the Universities of St. Andrews, Glasgow, Aberdeen and Edinburgh; to make provisions consequential on the foundation of a University of Dundee; and for purposes connected therewith.
| Guyana Independence Act 1966 | 1966 c. 14 | 12 May 1966 |
An Act to provide for the attainment by British Guiana of fully responsible status within the Commonwealth; to make provision as to the effect of certain certificates of naturalisation; and for purposes connected with the matters aforesaid.
| Military Aircraft (Loans) Act 1966 (repealed) | 1966 c. 15 | 26 May 1966 |
An Act to provide money for the purchase of military aircraft, and parts, equipment and other articles for, or for use in connection with, military aircraft, and for the making of payments in respect of costs (including development, testing and training costs) incurred in connection therewith; and for connected purposes. (Repealed by Statute Law (Repeals) Act 1993 (c. 50))
| Public Works Loans Act 1966 (repealed) | 1966 c. 16 | 26 May 1966 |
An Act to grant money for the purpose of certain local loans out of the Local Loans Fund. (Repealed by National Loans Act 1968 (c. 13))
| Transport Finances Act 1966 (repealed) | 1966 c. 17 | 26 May 1966 |
An Act to make further provision for the payment of grants to the British Railways Board and the British Waterways Board on account of deficits on revenue account down to the end of the year 1968; to authorise the payment of such grants to the London Transport Board; to continue the temporary suspension under section 64 of the Transport Act 1962 (Note: Transport Act 1962 (10 & 11 Eliz. 2. c. 46)) of the liability of the British Waterways Board to maintain inland waterways; and for purposes connected with the matters aforesaid. (Repealed by Statute Law (Repeals) Act 1974 (c. 22))
| Finance Act 1966 | 1966 c. 18 | 3 August 1966 |
An Act to grant certain duties, to alter other duties, and to amend the law relating to the National Debt and the Public Revenue, and to make further provision in connection with Finance.
| Law Reform (Miscellaneous Provisions) (Scotland) Act 1966 | 1966 c. 19 | 3 August 1966 |
An Act to exempt from arrestment on the dependence of an action sums falling to be paid by way of wages, salary or other earnings or by way of pension, to abolish the exemption from arrestment in execution of certain earnings payable by the Crown, and to provide for the variation from time to time of the amount of wages excepted from arrestment under the Wages Arrestment Limitation (Scotland) Act 1870; (Note: Wages Arrestment Limitation (Scotland) Act 1870 (33 & 34 Vict. c. 63)) to amend section 5 of the Adoption Act 1958, (Note: Adoption Act 1958 (7 & 8 Eliz. 2. c. 5)) and to provide in Scotland for the succession of an adopted person to the estate of his natural parent in certain circumstances; to amend section 5 of the Trusts (Scotland) Act 1961; (Note: Trusts (Scotland) Act 1961 (9 & 10 Eliz. 2. c. 57)) to provide for the admission in evidence of certain documents in civil proceedings; to confer jurisdiction on the sheriff court to vary or recall certain orders of the Court of Session in respect of maintenance, custody and welfare of children; to provide for the extension of certain time limits in appeals under the Summary Jurisdiction (Scotland) Act 1954; (Note: Summary Jurisdiction (Scotland) Act 1954 (2 & 3 Eliz. 2. c. 48)) and to provide that acts of adjournal and acts of sederunt shall be statutory instruments.
| Ministry of Social Security Act 1966 or the Supplementary Benefit Act 1966 (repealed) | 1966 c. 20 | 3 August 1966 |
An Act to provide for the appointment of a Minister of Social Security and the transfer to him of the functions of the Minister of Pensions and National Insurance and of certain functions of the National Assistance Board; to replace Part II of the National Assistance Act 1948 (Note: National Assistance Act 1948 (11 & 12 Geo. 6. c. 29)) by provisions giving rights to non-contributory benefit; and for purposes connected with those matters. (Repealed by Supplementary Benefits Act 1976 (c. 71))
| Overseas Aid Act 1966 (repealed) | 1966 c. 21 | 3 August 1966 |
An Act to make provision as to the power of the Minister of Overseas Development to provide assistance to, or for the benefit of, overseas countries and territories; to enable effect to be given to an international agreement for the establishment and operation of an Asian Development Bank; to enable the said Minister to make further contributions to the Indus Basin Development Fund and to remit interest on certain advances to the Commonwealth Development Corporation; to amend section 2 of the Colonial Development and Welfare Act 1959 (Note: Colonial Development and Welfare Act 1959 (7 & 8 Eliz. 2. c. 71)) and section 1 of the Commonwealth Teachers Act 1960; (Note: Commonwealth Teachers Act 1960 (8 & 9 Eliz. 2. c. 40)) and to provide for the establishment and administration of an Overseas Service Pensions Scheme. (Repealed by Overseas Development and Co-operation Act 1980 (c. 63))
| Malawi Republic Act 1966 | 1966 c. 22 | 3 August 1966 |
An Act to make provision as to the operation of the law in relation to Malawi as a republic within the Commonwealth.
| Botswana Independence Act 1966 | 1966 c. 23 | 3 August 1966 |
An Act to make provision for, and in connection with, the establishment of the Bechuanaland Protectorate, under the name of Botswana, as an independent republic within the Commonwealth.
| Lesotho Independence Act 1966 | 1966 c. 24 | 3 August 1966 |
An Act to make provision for, and in connection with, the establishment of Basutoland, under the name of Lesotho, as an independent kingdom within the Commonwealth.
| Post Office (Subway) Act 1966 | 1966 c. 25 | 3 August 1966 |
An Act to authorise the Postmaster General to construct a subway in the City of Birmingham.
| Appropriation (No. 2) Act 1966 (repealed) | 1966 c. 26 | 9 August 1966 |
An Act to apply a sum out of the Consolidated Fund to the service of the year ending on 31st March 1967, and to appropriate the supplies granted in this Session of Parliament. (Repealed by Statute Law (Repeals) Act 1971 (c. 52))
| Building Control Act 1966 | 1966 c. 27 | 9 August 1966 |
An Act to regulate building and constructional work.
| Docks and Harbours Act 1966 | 1966 c. 28 | 9 August 1966 |
An Act to make further provision for regulating the employment of dock workers, including provision for compensating persons prohibited from employing, or working on their own account as, dock workers and for raising sums required for paying such compensation; to make provision for welfare amenities in ports; to confer additional powers on harbour authorities; to provide for the assumption by harbour authorities as successors to certain other harbour authorities of a proportion of the debts of those other authorities; to make further provision for giving financial assistance in connection with the construction and improvement of harbours and the carrying out of harbour operations, and with respect to the orders and schemes which may be made under the Harbours Act 1964, (Note: Harbours Act 1964 (c. 40)) the charges which may be made by certain harbour authorities and lighthouse authorities, the policing of harbours and the furnishing of information and forecasts and the promotion of research, training and education under that Act; and for purposes connected with the matters aforesaid.
| Singapore Act 1966 | 1966 c. 29 | 9 August 1966 |
An Act to make provision in connection with the establishment of Singapore as an independent sovereign state within the Commonwealth.
| Reserve Forces Act 1966 (repealed) | 1966 c. 30 | 9 August 1966 |
An Act to make further provision with respect to reserve forces, associations established for the purposes of the Auxiliary Forces Act 1953, (Note: Auxiliary Forces Act 1953 (1 & 2 Eliz. 2. c. 50)) the discharge of men of the regular army and air force and the qualifications for appointment as deputy lieutenant; and for purposes connected with the matters aforesaid. (Repealed by Reserve Forces Act 1980 (c. 9))
| Criminal Appeal Act 1966 (repealed) | 1966 c. 31 | 9 August 1966 |
An Act to transfer the Court of Criminal Appeal's jurisdiction to hear appeals in criminal cases to the Court of Appeal; to amend the law relating to such appeals in England and Northern Ireland and appeals to the Courts-Martial Appeal Court; to amend the provisions of the Army Act 1955 (Note: Army Act 1955 (3 & 4 Eliz. 2. c. 18)) and the Air Force Act 1955 (Note: Air Force Act 1955 (3 & 4 Eliz. 2. c. 19)) relating to the powers of confirming officers; and for connected purposes. (Repealed by Supreme Court Act 1981 (c. 54))
| Selective Employment Payments Act 1966 | 1966 c. 32 | 9 August 1966 |
An Act to provide for payments in certain circumstances in respect of persons in respect of whom selective employment tax has been paid; and for connected purposes.
| Prices and Incomes Act 1966 | 1966 c. 33 | 12 August 1966 |
An Act to establish a National Board for Prices and Incomes, and authorise the bringing into force of provisions requiring notice of price increases, pay increases and other matters, and for enforcing a temporary standstill in prices or charges or terms and conditions of employment; in connection with recommendations made by the said Board, to amend the Restrictive Trade Practices Act 1956; (Note: Restrictive Trade Practices Act 1956 (4 & 5 Eliz. 2. c. 68)) to provide, for a period lasting not more than twelve months, for restricting price increases and pay increases and for other matters connected with prices and incomes; and for connected purposes.
| Industrial Development Act 1966 (repealed) | 1966 c. 34 | 12 August 1966 |
An Act to provide for the making of grants out of moneys provided by Parliament towards expenditure on the provision of new business assets; to provide for the exercise of powers under the Local Employment Acts 1960 (Note: Local Employment Act 1960 (8 & 9 Eliz. 2. c. 18)) and 1963 (Note: Local Employment Act 1963 (c. 19)) in relation to new development areas and to make other amendments in those Acts; to make new provision in relation to industrial development certificates; to amend section 3 of the Sea Fish Industry Act 1962; (Note: Sea Fish Industry Act 1962 (10 & 11 Eliz. 2. c. 31)) and for connected purposes. (Repealed by Statute Law (Repeals) Act 1993 (c. 50))
| Family Provision Act 1966 (repealed) | 1966 c. 35 | 17 November 1966 |
An Act to amend the law of England and Wales in relation to the rights after a person's death of that person's spouse or former spouse and children, and to repeal section 47(5) of the Administration of Estates Act 1925, (Note: Administration of Estates Act 1925 (15 & 16 Geo. 5. c. 23)) as amended. (Repealed by Inheritance and Trustees' Powers Act 2014 (c. 16))
| Veterinary Surgeons Act 1966 | 1966 c. 36 | 17 November 1966 |
An Act to make fresh provision for the management of the veterinary profession, for the registration of veterinary surgeons and veterinary practitioners, for regulating their professional education and professional conduct and for cancelling or suspending registration in cases of misconduct; and for connected purposes.
| Barbados Independence Act 1966 | 1966 c. 37 | 17 November 1966 |
An Act to make provision for, and in connection with, the attainment by Barbados of fully responsible status within the Commonwealth.
| Sea Fisheries Regulation Act 1966 (repealed) | 1966 c. 38 | 17 November 1966 |
An Act to consolidate (with corrections and improvements made under the Consolidation of Enactments (Procedure) Act 1949) (Note: Consolidation of Enactments (Procedure) Act 1949 (12, 13 & 14 Geo. 6. c. 33)) the Sea Fisheries Regulation Acts 1888 to 1930 and certain other enactments relating to the sea fisheries of England and Wales. (Repealed by Marine and Coastal Access Act 2009 (c. 23))
| Land Registration Act 1966 (repealed) | 1966 c. 39 | 13 December 1966 |
An Act to alter the provisions of Part XI of the Land Registration Act 1925 (Note: Land Registration Act 1925 (15 & 16 Geo. 5. c. 21)) relating to the making of orders creating areas of compulsory registration, to restrict the rights under that Act to register unregistered land in other areas, to amend its provisions relating to losses indemnifiable under that Act and to repeal section 11 of the Small Holdings and Allotments Act 1926. (Note: Small Holdings and Allotments Act 1926 (16 & 17 Geo. 5. c. 52)) (Repealed by Statute Law (Repeals) Act 1995 (c. 44))
| Expiring Laws Continuance Act 1966 (repealed) | 1966 c. 40 | 13 December 1966 |
An Act to continue certain expiring laws. (Repealed by Statute Law (Repeals) Act 1971 (c. 52))
| Arbitration (International Investment Disputes) Act 1966 | 1966 c. 41 | 13 December 1966 |
An Act to implement an international Convention on the settlement of investment disputes between States and nationals of other States.
| Local Government Act 1966 | 1966 c. 42 | 13 December 1966 |
An Act to make further provision, in relation to England and Wales, with respect to the payment of grants to local authorities, rating and valuation, the classification and lighting of highways and the powers of local authorities to place staff and facilities at the disposal of Ministers concerned with highways and to make payments offsetting the effect of the selective employment tax; to repeal or amend certain enactments relating to local licences and registrations; and for purposes connected with the matters aforesaid.
| Tribunals and Inquiries Act 1966 (repealed) | 1966 c. 43 | 13 December 1966 |
An Act to extend sections 1 and 7A of the Tribunals and Inquiries Act 1958 (Note: Tribunals and Inquiries Act 1958 (6 & 7 Eliz. 2. c. 66)) to further classes of statutory inquiries and hearings; to transfer to the Secretary of State the power to make rules of procedure under the said section 7A in respect of inquiries and hearings in Scotland; to apply section 8 of that Act to procedural rules made by the Commissioners of Inland Revenue; to make provision with respect to the attendance of members of the Council on Tribunals at personal hearings under section 231 of the Local Government Act 1933; (Note: Local Government Act 1933 (23 & 24 Geo. 5. c. 51)) and for purposes connected with the matters aforesaid. (Repealed by Tribunals and Inquiries Act 1971 (c. 62))
| New Towns Act 1966 (repealed) | 1966 c. 44 | 13 December 1966 |
An Act to raise the limit on advances imposed by section 43 of the New Towns Act 1965; (Note: New Towns Act 1965 (c. 59)) to amend the Land Compensation Act 1961 (Note: Land Compensation Act 1961 (9 & 10 Eliz. 2. c. 33)) and the Land Compensation (Scotland) Act 1963 (Note: Land Compensation (Scotland) Act 1963 (c. 51)) in connection with extensions made after the commencement of this Act to the areas of new towns; to repeal provisions of section 46 of the New Towns Act 1965 and section 13 of the New Towns Act 1946 (Note: New Towns Act 1946 (9 & 10 Geo. 6. c. 68)) relating to certain accounts and reports; and for purposes connected with the matters aforesaid. (Repealed by New Towns Act 1981 (c. 64))
| Armed Forces Act 1966 (repealed) | 1966 c. 45 | 21 December 1966 |
An Act to continue the Army Act 1955 and the Air Force Act 1955; to amend those Acts and the Naval Discipline Act 1957; (Note: Naval Discipline Act 1957 (5 & 6 Eliz. 2. c. 53)) to make fresh provision as to the engagement of persons for service in the Royal Navy, regular army and regular air force and as to the discharge and prolongation of service of ratings of the Royal Navy; to make provision as to the transfer to the reserve of such ratings; to provide for the taking into service custody in certain circumstances of persons overseas and subject to service law; and for purposes connected with the matters aforesaid. (Repealed by Armed Forces Act 2006 (c. 52))
| Bus Fuel Grants Act 1966 (repealed) | 1966 c. 46 | 21 December 1966 |
An Act to extend section 92 of the Finance Act 1965 (Note: Finance Act 1965 (c. 25)) so as to enable grants to be made under that section in respect of surcharges under section 9 of the Finance Act 1961 (Note: Finance Act 1961 (9 & 10 Eliz. 2. c. 36)) on customs and excise duties charged on fuel used in operating stage carriage services and to enable provision to be made in Northern Ireland for similar purposes. (Repealed by Transport Act 1968 (c. 73))
| National Coal Board (Additional Powers) Act 1966 (repealed) | 1966 c. 47 | 21 December 1966 |
An Act to confer on the National Coal Board certain powers with respect to petroleum within the meaning of the Petroleum (Production) Act 1934; (Note: Petroleum (Production) Act 1934 (24 & 25 Geo. 5. c. 36)) and for connected purposes. (Repealed by Coal Industry Act 1994 (c. 21))
| Films Act 1966 (repealed) | 1966 c. 48 | 21 December 1966 |
An Act to extend the periods during which loans, advances and orders may be made under the Cinematograph Film Production (Special Loans) Acts 1949 to 1957, a levy is to be imposed under the Cinematograph Films Act 1957 (Note: Cinematograph Films Act 1957 (5 & 6 Eliz. 2. c. 21)) and a quota of British films is to be maintained under the Films Acts 1960 and 1964; to raise the limit of exemptions from the quota; to increase the maximum fee payable on an application for the registration of a co-production film; and for connected purposes. (Repealed by Films Act 1985 (c. 21))
| Housing (Scotland) Act 1966 (repealed) | 1966 c. 49 | 21 December 1966 |
An Act to consolidate certain enactments relating to housing in Scotland, with the exception of certain provisions relating to financial matters. (Repealed by Housing (Scotland) Act 1987 (c. 26))
| Industrial Reorganisation Corporation Act 1966 | 1966 c. 50 | 21 December 1966 |
An Act to provide for the establishment of a public corporation with the functions of promoting or assisting the reorganisation or development of any industry or section of an industry and establishing or developing, or promoting the establishment or development of, any industrial enterprise, and for matters relating to the corporation and its functions.
| Local Government (Scotland) Act 1966 | 1966 c. 51 | 21 December 1966 |
An Act to make further provision, in relation to Scotland, with respect to the payment of grants to local authorities, valuation and rating, local authority expenditure and functions, and the classification and lighting of highways; to repeal or amend certain enactments relating to local licences and registrations; and for purposes connected with the matters aforesaid.
| Police (Scotland) Act 1966 (repealed) | 1966 c. 52 | 21 December 1966 |
An Act to amend section 18(2) of the Police (Scotland) Act 1956. (Note: Police (Scotland) Act 1956 (4 & 5 Eliz. 2. c. 26)) (Repealed by Police (Scotland) Act 1967 (c. 77))

== Local acts ==
| Short title | Citation | Royal assent |
Long title
| Covent Garden Market Act 1966 | 1966 c. i | 10 March 1966 |
An Act to make provision for the transfer of Covent Garden Market to a site in the London boroughs of Lambeth and Wandsworth; to empower the Covent Garden Market Authority to acquire lands and easements for that and other purposes; to confer further powers on that Authority; to amend the provisions of the Covent Garden Market Act 1961; (Note: Covent Garden Market Act 1961 (9 & 10 Eliz. 2. c. 49)) and for other purposes.
| Glasgow Corporation (Carnoustie Street) Bridge Order Confirmation Act 1966 | 1966 c. ii | 26 May 1966 |
An Act to confirm a Provisional Order under the Private Legislation Procedure (Scotland) Act 1936, (Note: Private Legislation Procedure (Scotland) Act 1936 (26 Geo. 5 & 1 Edw. 8. c. 52)) relating to Glasgow Corporation (Carnoustie Street) Bridge.
| | Glasgow Corporation (Carnoustie Street) Bridge Order 1966 Provisional Order to authorise the Corporation of the city of Glasgow to acquire lands and construct a bridge over the river Clyde in the vicinity of Carnoustie Street in the said city together with approaches thereto; to borrow money and for other purposes. | |
| Ministry of Housing and Local Government Provisional Orders Confirmation (Cambridge, Reading and Walsall) Act 1966 | 1966 c. iii | 3 August 1966 |
An Act to confirm Provisional Orders of the Minister of Housing and Local Government relating to the City of Cambridge and the county boroughs of Reading and Walsall.
| | City of Cambridge Order 1966 Provisional Order amending a Local Act (Note: Cambridge Corporation Act 1850 (13 & 14 Vict. c. xxxvii)) and a Confirming Act. (Note: Local Government Board's Provisional Orders Confirmation (No. 3) Act 1912 (2 & 3 Geo. 5. c. cxxix)) | |
| | Reading Order 1966 Provisional Order amending a Local Act. (Note: Reading Corporation Markets Act 1853 (16 & 17 Vict. c. xxxix)) | |
| | Walsall Order 1966 Provisional Order altering a Local Act. (Note: Walsall Improvement and Market Amendment Act 1850 (13 & 14 Vict. c. xv)) | |
| Ministry of Housing and Local Government Provisional Order Confirmation (West Kent Main Sewerage District) Act 1966 | 1966 c. iv | 3 August 1966 |
An Act to confirm a Provisional Order of the Minister of Housing and Local Government relating to the West Kent Main Sewerage District.
| | West Kent Main Sewerage Order 1966 Provisional Order amending certain Local Acts and Confirming Acts. | |
| Welsh Office Provisional Order Confirmation (Western Valleys (Monmouthshire) Sewerage Board) Act 1966 | 1966 c. v | 3 August 1966 |
An Act to confirm a Provisional Order of the Secretary of State relating to the Western Valleys (Monmouthshire) Sewerage Board.
| | Western Valleys (Monmouthshire) Sewerage Board Order 1966 Provisional Order amending Local Acts. | |
| Kent Quarter Sessions Act 1966 (repealed) | 1966 c. vi | 3 August 1966 |
An Act to make provision as to deputy chairmen of the court of quarter sessions for the county of Kent; and for purposes incidental thereto. (Repealed by County of Kent Act 1981 (c. xviii))
| Bradford Cathedral and Churchyard Act 1966 | 1966 c. vii | 3 August 1966 |
An Act to vest in the Chapter of the Cathedral Church of Saint Peter Bradford the said Cathedral and the churchyard of that Cathedral; to provide for the removal of certain restrictions attaching to the said churchyard; to authorise the use of the said churchyard for building and other purposes and the disposal thereof; and for other purposes.
| Loughborough University of Technology Act 1966 | 1966 c. viii | 3 August 1966 |
An Act to dissolve the Loughborough College of Technology and to transfer all the rights, property and liabilities of that college to the Loughborough University of Technology; to provide for the pooling of investments and moneys of certain endowment funds of the Loughborough University of Technology; and for other purposes.
| University of Surrey Act 1966 | 1966 c. ix | 3 August 1966 |
An Act to dissolve Battersea College of Technology and to transfer all the rights, property and liabilities of that college to the University of Surrey; to provide for the pooling of investments and moneys of certain endowment funds of the University of Surrey; and for other purposes.
| Royal Albert Hall Act 1966 | 1966 c. x | 3 August 1966 |
An Act to make better provision for the improvement, repair, maintenance and equipment of the Royal Albert Hall; to provide additional funds for the Corporation of the Hall of Arts and Sciences and to extend the powers of that Corporation as to the application of their existing funds; to amend and extend the existing provisions as to seat rates and seatholders and the use and letting of the hall; and for other purposes.
| Mersey Docks and Harbour Board Act 1966 | 1966 c. xi | 3 August 1966 |
An Act to authorise the Mersey Docks and Harbour Board to construct further works; and for other purposes.
| Scottish Union and National Insurance Company's Act 1966 | 1966 c. xii | 3 August 1966 |
An Act to confer powers upon the Scottish Union and National Insurance Company with respect to the distribution of capital profits and to empower the Norwich Union Fire Insurance Society Limited to acquire compulsorily shares in the said Company; and for other purposes.
| British Waterways Act 1966 | 1966 c. xiii | 3 August 1966 |
An Act to relieve the British Waterways Board from their obligation to maintain certain waterways for navigation and to extinguish rights of navigation thereon; and for other purposes.
| Huyton-with-Roby Urban District Council Act 1966 | 1966 c. xiv | 3 August 1966 |
An Act to empower the urban district council of Huyton-with-Roby to lease certain land; to provide for the development and use of that land and the extinguishment of public rights in, upon or over the same; and for other purposes.
| Exeter Corporation Act 1966 (repealed) | 1966 c. xv | 3 August 1966 |
An Act to confer further powers on the mayor, aldermen and citizens of the city of Exeter; to make further provision with regard to the health, local government and finances of the city; and for other purposes. (Repealed by Exeter City Council Act 1987 (c. xi))
| Barry Corporation Act 1966 | 1966 c. xvi | 3 August 1966 |
An Act to confer further powers on the mayor, aldermen and burgesses of the borough of Barry; to make further provision with respect to the health, local government, improvement and finances of the borough; and for other purposes.
| British Railways Act 1966 | 1966 c. xvii | 3 August 1966 |
An Act to empower the British Railways Board to construct works and to acquire lands; to extend the time for the compulsory purchase of certain lands and the completion of certain works; to confer further powers on the Board; and for other purposes.
| Derby Churches (Saint Christopher's, Saint Peter's and Saint Paul's) Act 1966 | 1966 c. xviii | 3 August 1966 |
An Act to provide for the demolition or disposal of the church of Saint Christopher, Derby, and of the church hall of the church of Saint Peter, Derby, to authorise the sale and use of the sites thereof and of lands appurtenant thereto for other purposes; to authorise the use of the churchyard of the church of Saint Paul, Derby, for other purposes; and for purposes incidental thereto.
| Ministry of Housing and Local Government Provisional Order Confirmation (City of Oxford) Act 1966 (repealed) | 1966 c. xix | 9 August 1966 |
An Act to confirm a Provisional Order of the Minister of Housing and Local Government relating to the City of Oxford. (Repealed by Oxfordshire Act 1985 (c. xxxiv))
| | City of Oxford Order 1966 Provisional Order amending Local Acts. | |
| Oldham Corporation Act 1966 | 1966 c. xx | 9 August 1966 |
An Act to authorise the mayor, aldermen and burgesses of the county borough of Oldham to make street improvements, to purchase land compulsorily therefor, to confer powers upon them with reference to the supply of hot water and of heat; and for other purposes.
| Saint Mary, Ealing Act 1966 | 1966 c. xxi | 9 August 1966 |
An Act to free part of the burial ground appurtenant to the church of Saint Mary, Ealing from the restrictions attaching to it as a disused burial ground; to authorise the use thereof for other purposes; and for purposes incidental thereto.
| Greater London Council (Money) Act 1966 | 1966 c. xxii | 9 August 1966 |
An Act to regulate the expenditure on capital account and on lending to other persons by the Greater London Council during the financial period from 1st April 1966 to 30th September 1967; and for other purposes.
| Mersey Docks and Harbour Board (Seaforth Works) Act 1966 | 1966 c. xxiii | 9 August 1966 |
An Act to authorise the Mersey Docks and Harbour Board to construct further works; and for other purposes.
| Blackfriars Bridgehead Improvements Act 1966 | 1966 c. xxiv | 9 August 1966 |
An Act to authorise the Corporation of London to extend the river wall and street works authorised by the Blackfriars Bridgehead Improvements Act 1960 (Note: Blackfriars Bridgehead Improvements Act 1960 (8 & 9 Eliz. 2. c. xlviii)) and to acquire lands compulsorily; and for other purposes.
| Tees and Hartlepools Port Authority Act 1966 | 1966 c. xxv | 9 August 1966 |
An Act to incorporate the Tees and Hartlepools Port Authority; to transfer to that Authority the undertakings of the Tees Conservancy Commissioners and the Hartlepool Port and Harbour Commissioners, the harbour and dock works of the British Transport Docks Board at the Hartlepools and Middlesbrough, the quay undertaking of the mayor, aldermen and burgesses of the borough of Stockton-on-Tees and the Middlesbrough wharf undertaking of the Tyne-Tees Steam Shipping Company Limited; to confer powers on that Authority; and for other purposes.
| Yorkshire Registries Amendment Act 1966 (repealed) | 1966 c. xxvi | 9 August 1966 |
An Act to amend the law relating to the registration of deeds and other matters affecting lands and hereditaments within the three ridings of the county of York; to confer further powers upon the county councils of the said ridings; and for other purposes. (Repealed by Registration of Title (Teesside, Leeds and Sheffield) Order 1970 (SI 1970/485))
| Manchester Ship Canal Act 1966 | 1966 c. xxvii | 9 August 1966 |
An Act to provide for the abandonment of certain works of the Manchester Ship Canal Company; to confer further powers upon the Company; and for other purposes.
| Greater London Council (General Powers) Act 1966 | 1966 c. xxviii | 9 August 1966 |
An Act to empower the City of London and Tower Hamlets Cemetery Company to sell to the Greater London Council the lands known as the City of London and Tower Hamlets Cemetery; to confer further powers upon the Greater London Council and other authorities; and for other purposes.
| United Kingdom Oil Pipelines Act 1966 | 1966 c. xxix | 9 August 1966 |
An Act to empower United Kingdom Oil Pipelines Limited to acquire lands; and for other purposes.
| Leeds Corporation Act 1966 (repealed) | 1966 c. xxx | 9 August 1966 |
An Act to confer further powers on the lord mayor, aldermen and citizens of the city of Leeds in relation to lands and buildings, and to make further provision for the improvement, health, local government and finances of the city; and for other purposes. (Repealed by West Yorkshire Act 1980 (c. xiv))
| British Transport Docks Act 1966 | 1966 c. xxxi | 9 August 1966 |
An Act to empower the British Transport Docks Board to construct works and to acquire lands; to confer further powers on the Board; and for other purposes.
| Thames Conservancy Act 1966 | 1966 c. xxxii | 9 August 1966 |
An Act to amend the Thames Conservancy Acts, 1932 to 1959; to make further provision in regard to the registration of pleasure boats using the river Thames and the registration charges and lock tolls payable in respect thereof; to extend the powers of the Conservators of the river Thames; and for other purposes.
| London Transport Act 1966 | 1966 c. xxxiii | 9 August 1966 |
An Act to empower the London Transport Board to construct works and to acquire lands, to extend the time for the compulsory purchase of certain lands, to confer further powers on the Board; and for other purposes.
| Pier and Harbour Orders (Blackpool Pier and Great Yarmouth New Britannia Pier) Confirmation Act 1966 | 1966 c. xxxiv | 12 August 1966 |
An Act to confirm certain Provisional Orders made by the Minister of Transport under the General Pier and Harbour Act 1861 (Note: General Pier and Harbour Act 1861 (24 & 25 Vict. c. 45)) relating to Blackpool Pier and Great Yarmouth New Britannia Pier.
| | Blackpool Pier Order 1966 Provisional Order to provide for the vesting in the Blackpool Pier Company Limited of the undertaking of the Blackpool Pier Company; to confer further powers on the first-named Company with reference to Blackpool North Pier; to repeal and amend certain enactments relating thereto; and for other purposes. | |
| | Great Yarmouth New Britannia Pier Order 1966 Provisional Order to provide for the vesting in the Great Yarmouth New Britannia Pier Company Limited of the undertaking of the Great Yarmouth New Britannia Pier Company; to confer further powers on the first-named Company with reference to the Great Yarmouth New Britannia Pier; to repeal and amend certain enactments relating thereto; and for other purposes. | |
| Whitley Bay Pier Act 1966 | 1966 c. xxxv | 12 August 1966 |
An Act to empower North Eastern Piers Limited to construct works and to acquire lands; and for other purposes.
| Liverpool Corporation Act 1966 | 1966 c. xxxvi | 13 December 1966 |
An Act to authorise the lord mayor, aldermen and citizens of the city of Liverpool to construct street works and other works; to acquire lands for those and other purposes; to confer further powers on the said lord mayor, aldermen and citizens; and for other purposes.
| Brighton Corporation Act 1966 (repealed) | 1966 c. xxxvii | 13 December 1966 |
An Act to confer further powers on the mayor, aldermen and burgesses of the county borough of Brighton; to make further provision with respect to the local government, improvement and finances of that borough; and for other purposes. (Repealed by East Sussex Act 1981 (c. xxv))
| Hove Corporation Act 1966 (repealed) | 1966 c. xxxviii | 13 December 1966 |
An Act to provide for the removal of restrictions attaching to the churchyard of the Church of Saint Andrew in the borough of Hove and the development and disposition thereof, to make further provision with reference to the local government and improvement of the borough; and for other purposes. (Repealed by East Sussex Act 1981 (c. xxv))
| Ross and Cromarty (Strathcarron–South Strome Road) Order Confirmation Act 1966 | 1966 c. xxxix | 21 December 1966 |
An Act to confirm a Provisional Order under the Private Legislation Procedure (Scotland) Act 1936, relating to Ross and Cromarty (Strathcarron-South Strome Road).
| | Ross and Cromarty (Strathcarron–South Strome Road) Order 1966 Provisional Order to provide for the construction and maintenance of a new road from Strathcarron to South Strome in the County of Ross and Cromarty and relative works; and for other purposes. | |
| Liverpool Corporation (General Powers) Act 1966 | 1966 c. xl | 21 December 1966 |
An Act to confer further powers on the lord mayor, aldermen and citizens of the city of Liverpool in relation to industry and lands; to empower them to establish an undertaking for the supply of heat; to make further provision for the improvement, health, local government and finances of the city; and for other purposes.
| Lee Valley Regional Park Act 1966 | 1966 c. xli | 21 December 1966 |
An Act to establish the Lee Valley Regional Park Authority for the development, preservation and management for recreation, sport, entertainment and the enjoyment of leisure of an area adjoining the river Lee as a regional park; to confer further powers upon the said authority and certain other authorities, bodies and persons; to enact provisions in connection with the matters aforesaid; and for other purposes.

== Sources ==
- The Public General Acts 1966. London: Her Majesty's Stationery Office. 1967 – via Google Books.

== See also ==
- List of acts of the Parliament of the United Kingdom
