= Police (Scotland) Act 1966 =

Act of the Parliament of the United Kingdom

Police (Scotland) Act 1966 (Note: Section 2.)
- Act of Parliament
- Parliament of the United Kingdom
- Long title: An Act to amend section 18(2) of the Police (Scotland) Act 1956.
- Citation: 1966 c. 52
- Territorial extent: Scotland (Note: Preamble.)

Dates
- Royal assent: 21 December 1966
- Commencement: 21 December 1966 (Note: The Acts of Parliament (Commencement) Act 1793.)
- Repealed: 27 October 1967
Other legislation
Amends	Police (Scotland) Act 1956
Repealed by	Police (Scotland) Act 1967

Status: Repealed

Text of statute as originally enacted

The Police (Scotland) Act 1966 (Note: Section 2.) (c. 52) was an act of the Parliament of the United Kingdom.

Section 1 of the act amended section 18(2) of the Police (Scotland) Act 1956 (4 & 5 Eliz. 2. c. 26).

== Subsequent developments ==
The whole act was repealed by section 52(1) of, and part I of schedule 5 to, the Police (Scotland) Act 1967, which came into force on 27 October 1967.

== Bibliography ==
- John Burke and Clifford Walsh (eds). "Police (Scotland) Act 1966". Current Law Statutes Annotated 1966. Sweet & Maxwell. Stevens & Sons. London. W Green & Son. Edinburgh. 1966. Chapter 52.
- David M Walker. The Scottish Legal System. Fourth Edition. W Green & Son. Edinburgh. Page 514.
- "Parliamentary Summary - Public Acts 1966-67". Whitaker's Almanack 1968. At p 355. Google
- (1967) 86 Law Notes 44 (No 2)
- (1966) 110 The Solicitors' Journal 874, 894, 966 and 982
- "Written Evidence". Royal Commission on Local Government in Scotland. pp 73 & 77. Google
- Scottish Grand Committee. "Police (Scotland) Bill". Official Report of the Standing Committees. 4 August 1966. Google
- HL Deb, 17 November 1966, vol 277, cols 1378 to 1387
- HL Deb, 13 December 1966, vol 278, cols 1568 to 1570
- HL Deb, 29 November 1966, vol 278, cols 707 to 714
- HC Deb, 20 December 1966, vol 738, cols 1372 to 1374
