= List of acts of the Parliament of the United Kingdom from 1956 =

This is a complete list of acts of the Parliament of the United Kingdom for the year 1956.

Note that the first parliament of the United Kingdom was held in 1801; parliaments between 1707 and 1800 were either parliaments of Great Britain or of Ireland. For acts passed up until 1707, see the list of acts of the Parliament of England and the list of acts of the Parliament of Scotland. For acts passed from 1707 to 1800, see the list of acts of the Parliament of Great Britain. See also the list of acts of the Parliament of Ireland.

For acts of the devolved parliaments and assemblies in the United Kingdom, see the list of acts of the Scottish Parliament, the list of acts of the Northern Ireland Assembly, and the list of acts and measures of Senedd Cymru; see also the list of acts of the Parliament of Northern Ireland.

The number shown after each act's title is its chapter number. Acts passed before 1963 are cited using this number, preceded by the year(s) of the reign during which the relevant parliamentary session was held; thus the Union with Ireland Act 1800 is cited as "39 & 40 Geo. 3 c. 67", meaning the 67th act passed during the session that started in the 39th year of the reign of George III and which finished in the 40th year of that reign. Note that the modern convention is to use Arabic numerals in citations (thus "41 Geo. 3" rather than "41 Geo. III"). Acts of the last session of the Parliament of Great Britain and the first session of the Parliament of the United Kingdom are both cited as "41 Geo. 3". Acts passed from 1963 onwards are simply cited by calendar year and chapter number.

== 4 & 5 Eliz. 2 ==
Continuing the first session of the 41st Parliament of the United Kingdom, which met from 7 June 1955 until 5 November 1956.

=== Public general acts ===
Short title	Citation	Royal assent
Long title
Leeward Islands Act 1956 (repealed)	4 & 5 Eliz. 2. c. 23	15 March 1956
An Act to constitute the Presidencies of the Leeward Islands separate colonies and confer upon Her Majesty power to make, or to authorize the making of, emergency laws therefor and to establish courts therefor; to amend the West Indian Court of Appeal Act, 1919; (Note: West Indian Court of Appeal Act 1919 (9 & 10 Geo. 5. c. 47)) and for purposes connected with the matters aforesaid. (Repealed by Statute Law (Repeals) Act 1986 (c. 12))
Children and Young Persons Act 1956 (repealed)	4 & 5 Eliz. 2. c. 24	15 March 1956
An Act to extend the provisions of the Children and Young Persons Act, 1933, (Note: Children and Young Persons Act 1933 (23 & 24 Geo. 5. c. 12)) and the Children and Young Persons (Scotland) Act, 1937, (Note: Children and Young Persons (Scotland) Act 1937 (1 Edw. 8 & 1 Geo. 6. c. 37)) with respect to escapes from the care of fit persons, from approved schools and from remand homes or special reception centres. (Repealed for Scotland by Social Work (Scotland) Act 1968 (c. 49) and for England and Wales by Children and Young Persons Act 1969 (c. 54))
Therapeutic Substances Act 1956 (repealed)	4 & 5 Eliz. 2. c. 25	15 March 1956
An Act to consolidate the Therapeutic Substances Act, 1925, (Note: Therapeutic Substances Act 1925 (15 & 16 Geo. 5. c. 60)) and the Therapeutic Substances (Prevention of Misuse) Acts, 1947 to 1953. (Repealed by Statute Law (Repeals) Act 1993 (c. 50))
Police (Scotland) Act 1956 (repealed)	4 & 5 Eliz. 2. c. 26	15 March 1956
An Act to consolidate with amendments certain enactments relating to police forces in Scotland and to the execution of warrants in the border counties of England and Scotland. (Repealed by Police (Scotland) Act 1967 (c. 77))
Charles Beattie Indemnity Act 1956 (repealed)	4 & 5 Eliz. 2. c. 27	15 March 1956
An Act to indemnify Charles Beattie, Esquire, from any penal consequences which he may have incurred by sitting and voting as a member of the House of Commons while holding the office or place of member of certain panels constituted in pursuance of the National Insurance (Industrial Injuries) Act (Northern Ireland) 1946, (Note: National Insurance (Industrial Injuries) Act (Northern Ireland) 1946 (c. 21 (N.I.))) and the National Insurance Act (Northern Ireland) 1946, (Note: National Insurance Act (Northern Ireland) 1946 (c. 23 (N.I.))) or of member of an appeal tribunal constituted in pursuance of the National Assistance Act (Northern Ireland) 1948. (Note: National Assistance Act (Northern Ireland) 1948 (c. 13 (N.I.))) (Repealed by Representation of the People Act 1969 (c. 15))
Agricultural Research Act 1956 (repealed)	4 & 5 Eliz. 2. c. 28	15 March 1956
An Act to make provision with respect to agricultural research. (Repealed by Statute Law (Repeals) Act 1998 (c. 43))
Dentists Act 1956 (repealed)	4 & 5 Eliz. 2. c. 29	15 March 1956
An Act to amend the law relating to dentists. (Repealed by Dentists Act 1983 (c. 38))
Food and Drugs (Scotland) Act 1956 (repealed)	4 & 5 Eliz. 2. c. 30	15 March 1956
An Act to amend and consolidate certain enactments in Scotland relating to food and drugs, and for purposes connected therewith. (Repealed by Food Safety Act 1990 (c. 16))
Pakistan (Consequential Provision) Act 1956 (repealed)	4 & 5 Eliz. 2. c. 31	15 March 1956
An Act to make provision as to the operation of the law in relation to Pakistan and persons and things in any way belonging to or connected with Pakistan, in view of Pakistan's becoming a Republic while remaining a member of the Commonwealth. (Repealed by Pakistan Act 1973 (c. 48))
Consolidated Fund Act 1956 (repealed)	4 & 5 Eliz. 2. c. 32	28 March 1956
An Act to apply certain sums out of the Consolidated Fund to the service of the years ending on the thirty-first day of March, one thousand nine hundred and fifty-five, one thousand nine hundred and fifty-six and one thousand nine hundred and fifty-seven. (Repealed by Statute Law Revision Act 1964 (c. 79))
Housing Subsidies Act 1956 (repealed)	4 & 5 Eliz. 2. c. 33	28 March 1956
An Act to make provision with respect to contributions in connection with housing accommodation. (Repealed by Housing Finance Act 1972 (c. 47))
Criminal Justice Administration Act 1956 (repealed)	4 & 5 Eliz. 2. c. 34	28 March 1956
An Act to make new arrangements as to the administration of criminal justice in Lancashire and matters connected therewith, and to amend the law of England and Wales as to recorders and courts of quarter sessions in boroughs, as to the retirement or removal of chairmen and deputy chairmen of quarter sessions and of stipendiary magistrates in London, as to the liability of boroughs to contribute to the costs of magistrates' courts and courts of quarter sessions for the county and as to the constitution for purposes of appeals of the court of quarter sessions for the county of London, to make further provision about shorthand notes taken on trials on indictment, and to transfer to the Lord Chancellor or the Chancellor of the Duchy of Lancaster certain functions of the Secretary of State and to the Rule Committee of the Supreme Court the power to make rules of court under the Criminal Appeal Act, 1907, (Note: Criminal Appeal Act 1907 (7 Edw. 7. c. 23)) and rules under the Indictments Act, 1915. (Note: Indictments Act 1915 (5 & 6 Geo. 5. c. 90)) (Repealed by Administration of Justice Act 1973 (c. 15))
Validation of Elections (Northern Ireland) Act 1956 (repealed)	4 & 5 Eliz. 2. c. 35	28 March 1956
An Act to validate the election to the Senate of Northern Ireland of Lieutenant Colonel Henry Sacheverell Carleton Richardson and the election to the House of Commons of Northern Ireland of Doctor Eileen Mary Hickey, The Right Honourable Sir William McCleery, Knight, Doctor Robert Samuel Nixon, and Captain The Right Honourable Sir Norman Stronge, Baronet, notwithstanding their holding certain offices; to indemnify the persons aforesaid from any penal consequences which they may have incurred by sitting and voting as members of the said Senate or House of Commons while holding those offices; and to indemnify the estate of the late Henry Fleming, Esquire, from any penal consequences which may have been incurred by him by sitting and voting as a member of the said Senate while holding a certain office. (Repealed by Statute Law (Repeals) Act 1969 (c. 52))
Local Authorities (Expenses) Act 1956 (repealed)	4 & 5 Eliz. 2. c. 36	28 March 1956
An Act to enable local authorities to defray certain expenses in connection with official and courtesy visits; and for purposes connected with the matter aforesaid. (Repealed by Local Government Act 1972 (c. 70) and Statute Law (Repeals) Act 1976 (c. 16))
Licensing (Airports) Act 1956 (repealed)	4 & 5 Eliz. 2. c. 37	17 May 1956
An Act to exempt international airports from the restrictions on the times at which intoxicating liquor may be sold or supplied. (Repealed for Scotland by Licensing (Scotland) Act 1959 (7 & 8 Eliz. 2. c. 51) and for England and Wales by Licensing Act 1964 (c. 26))
Agricultural Mortgage Corporation Act 1956	4 & 5 Eliz. 2. c. 38	17 May 1956
An Act to amend the memorandum of association of the Agricultural Mortgage Corporation Limited; validate certain debenture stock issued by that company, and, in connection therewith, amend a deed made by it for securing debenture stock issued by it; and authorise the Minister of Agriculture, Fisheries and Food to make further advances to that company for the purpose of increasing its guarantee fund.
Pensions (Increase) Act 1956 (repealed)	4 & 5 Eliz. 2. c. 39	17 May 1956
An Act to provide for increases in certain pensions; and to amend the Pensions (Increase) Acts, 1920 (Note: Pensions (Increase) Act 1920 (10 & 11 Geo. 5. c. 36)) and 1924, (Note: Pensions (Increase) Act 1924 (14 & 15 Geo. 5. c. 32)) the Pensions (Increase) Acts, 1944 (Note: Pensions (Increase) Act 1944 (7 & 8 Geo. 6. c. 21)) and 1947, (Note: Pensions (Increase) Act 1947 (10 & 11 Geo. 6. c. 7)) the Pensions (Increase) Act, 1952, (Note: Pensions (Increase) Act 1952 (15 & 16 Geo. 6 & 1 Eliz. 2. c. 45)) and the Second Schedule to the Pensions (India, Pakistan and Burma) Act, 1955. (Note: Pensions (India, Pakistan and Burma) Act 1955 (3 & 4 Eliz. 2. c. 22)) (Repealed by Pensions (Increase) Act 1971 (c. 56))
Local Government (Street Works) (Scotland) Act 1956 (repealed)	4 & 5 Eliz. 2. c. 40	17 May 1956
An Act to authorise local authorities in Scotland to contribute to the expenses incurred by frontagers and others in connection with the construction, maintenance or making up of private streets, new streets and footways. (Repealed by Roads (Scotland) Act 1970 (c. 20))
Solicitors (Amendment) Act 1956 (repealed)	4 & 5 Eliz. 2. c. 41	17 May 1956
An Act to amend the enactments relating to solicitors and for purposes connected therewith. (Repealed by Solicitors (Amendment) Act 1974 (c. 26))
Occasional Licences and Young Persons Act 1956 (repealed)	4 & 5 Eliz. 2. c. 42	5 July 1956
An Act to amend the law with respect to occasional licences. (Repealed for Scotland by Licensing (Scotland) Act 1959 (7 & 8 Eliz. 2. c. 51) and for England and Wales by Licensing Act 1961 (c. 61))
Local Government Elections Act 1956 (repealed)	4 & 5 Eliz. 2. c. 43	5 July 1956
An Act to provide for the simultaneous holding of elections of rural district councillors and parish councillors; to require the expenses incurred in relation to the holding of elections of parish councillors to be paid by the council of the rural district within which the parish is situate; to provide for excluding certain days in computing the period of time within which elections to fill casual vacancies occurring in the offices of county, borough and district councillor and elective auditor are required to be held; and for purposes connected with the matters aforesaid. (Repealed by Local Government Act 1972 (c. 70))
Magistrates' Courts (Appeals from Binding Over Orders) Act 1956	4 & 5 Eliz. 2. c. 44	5 July 1956
An Act to amend the law relating to orders of justices of the peace requiring persons to enter into recognisances to keep the peace or be of good behaviour.
Small Lotteries and Gaming Act 1956 (repealed)	4 & 5 Eliz. 2. c. 45	5 July 1956
An Act to authorise the conduct of small lotteries for other than private gain by societies for raising money for charitable, sporting and other purposes and to amend the law with respect to gaming; and for other purposes connected with the matters aforesaid. (Repealed by Betting, Gaming and Lotteries Act 1963 (c. 2) and Betting Duties Act 1963 (c. 3))
Administration of Justice Act 1956	4 & 5 Eliz. 2. c. 46	5 July 1956
An Act to amend the law relating to Admiralty jurisdiction, legal proceedings in connection with ships and aircraft and the arrest of ships and other property, to make further provision as to the appointment, tenure of office, powers and qualifications of certain judges and officers, to make certain other amendments of the law relating to the Supreme Court and the county courts and of the law relating to the enforcement of certain judgments, orders and decrees, to enable certain funds in court in the Lancashire Chancery Court to be transferred to the official trustees of charitable funds or the Church Commissioners, and for purposes connected with the matters aforesaid.
National Insurance Act 1956 (repealed)	4 & 5 Eliz. 2. c. 47	5 July 1956
An Act to provide for altering the extent to which deductions from widows' benefits and retirement pensions under the National Insurance Act, 1946, (Note: National Insurance Act 1946 (9 & 10 Geo. 6. c. 67)) are to be made in respect of earnings. (Repealed by Statute Law Revision (Consequential Repeals) Act 1965 (c. 55))
Sugar Act 1956 (repealed)	4 & 5 Eliz. 2. c. 48	5 July 1956
An Act to provide for the establishment of a Sugar Board, and to make provision as to the functions and finances of the Board, including provision for a surcharge on sugar and molasses and provision for distributing any surplus revenues of the Board; to make further provision as respects the British Sugar Corporation Limited, to dissolve the Sugar Commission, and otherwise to make new provision as respects the sugar industry in, and the importation of sugar and related goods into, the United Kingdom; and for purposes connected with the matters aforesaid. (Repealed by Food Act 1984 (c. 30))
Agriculture (Safety, Health and Welfare Provisions) Act 1956	4 & 5 Eliz. 2. c. 49	5 July 1956
An Act to provide for securing the safety, health and welfare of persons employed in agriculture and certain other occupations and the avoidance of accidents to children arising out of the use, in connection with agriculture, of vehicles, machinery or implements; and for purposes connected with the matters aforesaid.
Family Allowances and National Insurance Act 1956 (repealed)	4 & 5 Eliz. 2. c. 50	5 July 1956
An Act to increase the rate of certain allowances under the Family Allowances Acts, 1945 (Note: Family Allowances Act 1945 (8 & 9 Geo. 6. c. 41)) and 1952; (Note: Family Allowances and National Insurance Act 1952 (15 & 16 Geo. 6 & 1 Eliz. 2. c. 29)) to extend the definition of a child for the purposes of those Acts, the National Insurance (Industrial Injuries) Acts, 1946 to 1954, and the National Insurance Acts, 1946 to 1955; to amend the provisions of the said Acts of 1946 to 1954 and 1946 to 1955 with respect to benefits payable to widows; to validate certain marriages for the purposes of the Acts aforesaid; to make provision with respect to reciprocal arrangements with other countries in connection with family allowances; to authorise a local authority to whose care a person has been committed by an order of any court under the Children and Young Persons Act, 1933, or the Children and Young Persons (Scotland) Act, 1937, to entrust the care and control of that person to a parent, guardian, relative or friend; to permit such a person to be treated as included in a family for the purposes of family allowances while the control of that person is so entrusted; and for purposes connected with the matters aforesaid. (Repealed by Statute Law Revision (Consequential Repeals) Act 1965 (c. 55), Social Work (Scotland) Act 1968 (c. 49) and Children and Young Persons Act 1969 (c. 54))
Workmen's Compensation and Benefit (Supplementation) Act 1956 (repealed)	4 & 5 Eliz. 2. c. 51	5 July 1956
An Act to provide for the payment of allowances out of the Industrial Injuries Fund with a view to supplementing workmen's compensation and benefit, and for purposes connected therewith. (Repealed by Workmen's Compensation and Benefit (Amendment) Act 1965 (c. 79))
Clean Air Act 1956 (repealed)	4 & 5 Eliz. 2. c. 52	5 July 1956
An Act to make provision for abating the pollution of the air. (Repealed by Clean Air Act 1993 (c. 11))
Teachers (Superannuation) Act 1956 (repealed)	4 & 5 Eliz. 2. c. 53	5 July 1956
An Act to amend the Elementary School Teachers (Superannuation) Act, 1898, (Note: Elementary School Teachers (Superannuation) Act 1898 (61 & 62 Vict. c. 57.)) the Teachers (Superannuation) Acts, 1918 to 1946, and so much of the Education (Scotland) Acts, 1939 to 1953, as relates to superannuation and to the employment of teachers over the age of sixty-five years; and for purposes connected therewith. (Repealed for Scotland by Education (Scotland) Act 1962 (10 & 11 Eliz. 2. c. 47) and for England and Wales by Statute Law Revision (Consequential Repeals) Act 1965 (c. 55), Teachers' Superannuation Act 1965 (c. 83) and Teachers' Superannuation Act 1967 (c. 12))
Finance Act 1956	4 & 5 Eliz. 2. c. 54	2 August 1956
An Act to grant certain duties, to alter other duties, and to amend the law relating to the National Debt and the Public Revenue, to authorise advances out of the Consolidated Fund to nationalised industries and undertakings, and to make further provision in connection with Finance.
Appropriation Act 1956 (repealed)	4 & 5 Eliz. 2. c. 55	2 August 1956
An Act to apply a sum out of the Consolidated Fund to the service of the year ending on the thirty-first day of March, one thousand nine hundred and fifty-seven and to appropriate the further supplies granted in this Session of Parliament. (Repealed by Statute Law (Repeals) Act 1974 (c. 22))
Transport (Disposal of Road Haulage Property) Act 1956 (repealed)	4 & 5 Eliz. 2. c. 56	2 August 1956
An Act to amend the provisions of the Transport Act, 1953, (Note: Transport Act 1953 (1 & 2 Eliz. 2. c. 13)) relating to the disposal by the British Transport Commission of the property held by them for the purposes of the existing road haulage undertaking (including the provisions as to the transport levy and the Transport Fund), to extend certain enactments relating to holding companies to the British Transport Commission, and for purposes connected with the matters aforesaid. (Repealed by Transport Act 1962 (10 & 11 Eliz. 2. c. 46))
Slum Clearance (Compensation) Act 1956 (repealed)	4 & 5 Eliz. 2. c. 57	2 August 1956
An Act to make additional provision for payments in respect of certain unfit houses subject to compulsory purchase, clearance, demolition or closing orders; and for purposes connected therewith. (Repealed by Town and Country Planning Act 1959 (7 & 8 Eliz. 2. c. 53))
Department of Scientific and Industrial Research Act 1956 (repealed)	4 & 5 Eliz. 2. c. 58	2 August 1956
An Act to make provision with respect to the Department of Scientific and Industrial Research; and for purposes connected therewith. (Repealed by Science and Technology Act 1965 (c. 4))
Underground Works (London) Act 1956	4 & 5 Eliz. 2. c. 59	2 August 1956
An Act to vest in the Minister of Works certain underground works constructed in London during the recent war as air-raid shelters, together with other works connected therewith and land adjacent to those works; and for purposes connected with the matter aforesaid.
Valuation and Rating (Scotland) Act 1956	4 & 5 Eliz. 2. c. 60	2 August 1956
An Act to amend the law regarding valuation and rating in Scotland; to amend the provisions of the Local Government (Financial Provisions) (Scotland) Act, 1954, (Note: Local Government (Financial Provisions) (Scotland) Act 1954 (2 & 3 Eliz. 2. c. 13)) with respect to the payment of Exchequer Grants to local authorities in Scotland and with respect to the apportionment of the expenditure of joint bodies among their constituent authorities; and for purposes connected with the matters aforesaid.
Coal Industry Act 1956 (repealed)	4 & 5 Eliz. 2. c. 61	2 August 1956
An Act to extend the power of the Minister of Fuel and Power to make advances to the National Coal Board for capital purposes; and to alter the financial year of the National Coal Board. (Repealed by Coal Industry Act 1965 (c. 82))
Hotel Proprietors Act 1956	4 & 5 Eliz. 2. c. 62	2 August 1956
An Act to amend the law relating to inns and innkeepers.
British Caribbean Federation Act 1956 (repealed)	4 & 5 Eliz. 2. c. 63	2 August 1956
An Act to provide for the federation of certain West Indian colonies and for the transfer, to a court established for the purposes of the federation, of the jurisdiction of the Court of Appeal established by the West Indian Court of Appeal Act, 1919, and the dissolution of that Court; to provide for conferring on the first-mentioned court jurisdiction to hear and determine appeals from the courts of colonies which are not for the time being included in the federation and to repeal the British Honduras (Court of Appeal) Act, 1881; (Note: British Honduras (Court of Appeal) Act 1881 (44 & 45 Vict. c. 36)) and for purposes connected with the matters aforesaid. (Repealed by Statute Law (Repeals) Act 1986 (c. 12))
Governors' Pensions Act 1956 (repealed)	4 & 5 Eliz. 2. c. 64	2 August 1956
An Act to amend the Pensions (Governors of Dominions, &c.) Acts, 1911 to 1947. (Repealed by Governors' Pensions Act 1957 (5 & 6 Eliz. 2. c. 62))
Public Works Loans Act 1956 (repealed)	4 & 5 Eliz. 2. c. 65	2 August 1956
An Act to grant money for the purpose of certain local loans out of the Local Loans Fund. (Repealed by Public Works Loans Act 1964 (c. 9))
Sanitary Inspectors (Change of Designation) Act 1956 (repealed)	4 & 5 Eliz. 2. c. 66	2 August 1956
An Act to change to public health inspectors the designation of sanitary inspectors appointed under the Local Government Act, 1933, (Note: Local Government Act 1933 (23 & 24 Geo. 5. c. 51)) or the London Government Act, 1939. (Note: London Government Act 1939 (2 & 3 Geo. 6. c. 40)) (Repealed by Statute Law (Repeals) Act 1977 (c. 18))
Road Traffic Act 1956 (repealed)	4 & 5 Eliz. 2. c. 67	2 August 1956
An Act to amend the law relating to road traffic (including driving licences, lighting and insurance), the provision of parking places, the regulation of public service vehicles and the licensing of goods vehicles; and for purposes connected therewith. (Repealed by Statute Law (Repeals) Act 1989 (c. 43))
Restrictive Trade Practices Act 1956 (repealed)	4 & 5 Eliz. 2. c. 68	2 August 1956
An Act to provide for the registration and judicial investigation of certain restrictive trading agreements, and for the prohibition of such agreements when found contrary to the public interest; to prohibit the collective enforcement of conditions regulating the resale price of goods, and to make further provision for the individual enforcement of such conditions by legal proceedings; to amend the Monopolies and Restrictive Practices Acts, 1948 (Note: Monopolies and Restrictive Practices (Inquiry and Control) Act 1948 (11 & 12 Geo. 6. c. 66)) and 1953; (Note: Monopolies and Restrictive Practices Commission Act 1953 (1 & 2 Eliz. 2. c. 51)) to provide for the appointment of additional judges of the High Court and of the Court of Session; and for other purposes connected with the matters aforesaid. (Repealed by Restrictive Practices Court Act 1976 (c. 33), Restrictive Trade Practices Act 1976 (c. 34) and Resale Prices Act 1976 (c. 53))
Sexual Offences Act 1956	4 & 5 Eliz. 2. c. 69	2 August 1956
An Act to consolidate (with corrections and improvements made under the Consolidation of Enactments (Procedure) Act, 1949) (Note: Consolidation of Enactments (Procedure) Act 1949 (12, 13 & 14 Geo. 6. c. 33)) the statute law of England and Wales relating to sexual crimes, to the abduction, procuration and prostitution of women and to kindred offences, and to make such adaptations of statutes extending beyond England and Wales as are needed in consequence of that consolidation.
Marriage (Scotland) Act 1956	4 & 5 Eliz. 2. c. 70	2 August 1956
An Act to amend the law with regard to notice of marriages intended to be celebrated or contracted in Scotland.
Overseas Resources Development Act 1956 (repealed)	4 & 5 Eliz. 2. c. 71	2 August 1956
An Act to make new provision as to the functions of the Colonial Development Corporation, including provision in respect of past activities of the said Corporation; and for purposes connected with the matters aforesaid. (Repealed by Overseas Resources Development Act 1959 (7 & 8 Eliz. 2. c. 23))
Hill Farming Act 1956 (repealed)	4 & 5 Eliz. 2. c. 72	5 November 1956
An Act to extend the time within which livestock rearing land improvement schemes may be submitted under the Hill Farming Act, 1946, increase the maximum amount that may be paid in the aggregate by way of grants in respect of the cost of work done in accordance with such schemes and extend the time within which the said maximum may be further increased by order of the Minister of Agriculture, Fisheries and Food and the Secretary of State; and to prolong the powers under that Act of those Ministers to make subsidy payments in respect of hill sheep and hill cattle. (Repealed by Agriculture Act 1970 (c. 40))
Crown Estate Act 1956 (repealed)	4 & 5 Eliz. 2. c. 73	5 November 1956
An Act to provide for the reconstitution of the Commissioners of Crown Lands under the name of the Crown Estate Commissioners; to transfer to the Lord Privy Seal and the Secretary of State certain powers of the Treasury under section thirty-two of the Crown Lands Act, 1851, (Note: Crown Lands Act 1851 (14 & 15 Vict. c. 42)) in its application to the said Commissioners, and to make new provision as to the annual report of the said Commissioners; and for purposes connected with the matters aforesaid. (Repealed by Crown Estate Act 1961 (9 & 10 Eliz. 2. c. 55))
Copyright Act 1956 (repealed)	4 & 5 Eliz. 2. c. 74	5 November 1956
An Act to make new provision in respect of copyright and related matters, in substitution for the provisions of the Copyright Act, 1911, (Note: Copyright Act 1911 (1 & 2 Geo. 5. c. 46)) and other enactments relating thereto; to amend the Registered Designs Act, 1949, (Note: Registered Designs Act 1949 (12, 13 & 14 Geo. 6. c. 88)) with respect to designs related to artistic works in which copyright subsists, and to amend the Dramatic and Musical Performers' Protection Act, 1925; (Note: Dramatic and Musical Performers' Protection Act 1925 (15 & 16 Geo. 5. c. 46)) and for purposes connected with the matters aforesaid. (Repealed by Copyright, Designs and Patents Act 1988 (c. 48))
Education (Scotland) Act 1956 (repealed)	4 & 5 Eliz. 2. c. 75	5 November 1956
An Act to amend the Education (Scotland) Act, 1946, (Note: Education (Scotland) Act 1946 (9 & 10 Geo. 6. c. 72)) and certain other enactments relating to education in Scotland and for purposes connected therewith. (Repealed by Education (Scotland) Act 1962 (10 & 11 Eliz. 2. c. 47))
Medical Act 1956 (repealed)	4 & 5 Eliz. 2. c. 76	5 November 1956
An Act to consolidate certain enactments relating to medical practitioners with corrections and improvements made under the Consolidation of Enactments (Procedure) Act, 1949. (Repealed by Medical Act 1983 (c. 54))

=== Local acts ===
Short title	Citation	Royal assent
Long title
Monmouthshire County Council Act 1956	4 & 5 Eliz. 2. c. xxxi	15 March 1956
An Act to confer further powers on the Monmouthshire County Council and local authorities in the administrative county of Monmouth in relation to lands and highways and the local government improvement health and finances of the county to enact provisions with respect to public entertainments and for other purposes.
Crosby Corporation Act 1956 (repealed)	4 & 5 Eliz. 2. c. xxxii	15 March 1956
An Act to extend the boundaries of the borough of Crosby to authorise the Corporation of the said borough to acquire lands compulsorily to make further and better provision for the health local government improvement and finances of the borough and for other purposes. (Repealed by County of Merseyside Act 1980 (c. x))
Blyth Generating Station (Ancillary Powers) Act 1956	4 & 5 Eliz. 2. c. xxxiii	15 March 1956
An Act to confer further powers upon the Central Electricity Authority for the construction of ancillary works in connection with the proposed Blyth generating station and for the acquisition of lands and easements for the purposes thereof or in connection therewith and for other purposes.
Dundee Corporation Act 1956 (repealed)	4 & 5 Eliz. 2. c. xxxiv	15 March 1956
An Act to confer further powers on the corporation of the city and royal burgh of Dundee with respect to their transport undertaking and for other purposes. (Repealed by Dundee Corporation (Consolidated Powers) Order Confirmation 1957 (6 & 7 Eliz. 2. c. iv))
Archdeacon Johnson's Almshouse Charity (Oakham and Uppingham) Scheme Confirmation Act 1956	4 & 5 Eliz. 2. c. xxxv	28 March 1956
An Act to confirm a Scheme of the Charity Commissioners for the application or management of the Charity called Archdeacon Johnson's Almshouse Charity, in the Parishes of Oakham and Uppingham, in the County of Rutland.
	Scheme for the Application or Management of the following Charity in the county of Rutland:— The Charity called Archdeacon Johnson's Almshouse Charity, in the Parishes of Oakham and Uppingham in the county of Rutland.	
Baptist Chapel and Other Charities (Totnes and Tuckenhay) Scheme Confirmation Act 1956	4 & 5 Eliz. 2. c. xxxvi	28 March 1956
An Act to confirm a Scheme of the Charity Commissioners for the application or management of the Charity known as the Baptist Chapel and other Charities at Totnes and Tuckenhay in the County of Devon.
	Scheme for the Application or Management of the following Charities in the county of Devon:—: 1. The Charity known as the Baptist Chapel, at Totnes, comprised in a conveyance dated the 28th November 1877 to which Charity by Order of the Charity Commissioners of the 16th November 1954 the Charitable Trusts Acts 1853 to 1939, were extended in so far as might be necessary to enable the Commissioners to approve and certify to Parliament a Scheme for the application and management of the Charity; 2. The Charity for a Manse for the Minister of the said Baptist Chapel, at Totnes, which Charity is comprised in a declaration of trust dated the 11th July 1921; 3. The Charity consisting of a Manse and of the net proceeds of sale of the Congregational Chapel, Schoolroom and Trust Property, at Totnes, comprised in the following instruments or some of them:— Conveyance dated the 19th February 1835; Conveyance dated the 11th June 1841; Conveyance dated the 30th November 1882; Conveyance dated the 22nd December 1917; Scheme of the Charity Commissioners of the 25th November 1927; Scheme of the said Charity Commissioners of the 24th November 1953; 4. The Charity of Barbara Jetsome for the Minister of the said Congregational Chapel, at Totnes, which Charity was founded by will dated the 14th March 1734 and is comprised in an indenture dated the 20th December 1792; 5. The Charity of Barbara Jetsome for the benefit of Poor Members attending the said Congregational Chapel, at Totnes, which Charity was founded by the said will dated the 14th March 1734 and comprised in the said indenture dated 20th December 1792; 6. The Charity of Harriet Southcott for the upkeep and repair of the said Congregational Chapel, at Totnes, which Charity was founded by will proved at Exeter on the 31st July 1944; 7. The Charity known as the Baptist Mission Chapel, at Tuckenhay, comprised in a conveyance dated the 10th December 1906 to which Charity by an Order of the Charity Commissioners of the 16th November 1954 the Charitable Trusts Acts 1853 to 1939, were extended in so far as might be necessary to enable the Commissioners to approve and certify to Parliament a Scheme for the application and management of the Charity.	
Leigh Almshouse, Stoneleigh and other Charities Scheme Confirmation Act 1956	4 & 5 Eliz. 2. c. xxxvii	28 March 1956
An Act to confirm a Scheme of the Charity Commissioners for the application or management of certain Charities in the Parish of Stoneleigh, in the County of Warwick.
	Scheme for the Application or Management of the following Charities, in the county of Warwick:—: 1. The Almshouse of Thomas Leigh, knight, and of Alice, his wife, comprised in the following instruments:— Letters Patent of Grant of 28th June 1577. Deed Poll dated the 1st March 1579; 2. The Almshouses for Poor Widows, founded by Deed of Gift dated 9th May 1855; 3. The Share of the net yearly income of Alicia Duchess of Dudley's Charity which is applicable under the provisions of a Scheme of the Charity Commissioners of the 13th June 1879 as amended by a Scheme of the said Commissioners of the 6th January 1885 for the benefit of the Almspeople of the Charity numbered 1 above and the Poor of Stoneleigh.	
Greenock Burgh Extension, &c. Order Confirmation Act 1956	4 & 5 Eliz. 2. c. xxxviii	28 March 1956
An Act to confirm a Provisional Order under the Private Legislation Procedure (Scotland) Act 1936 (Note: Private Legislation Procedure (Scotland) Act 1936 (26 Geo. 5 & 1 Edw. 8. c. 52)) relating to Greenock Burgh Extension &c.
	Greenock Burgh Extension, &c. Order 1956 Provisional Order to extend the boundaries of the burgh of Greenock and for other purposes.	
Ministry of Housing and Local Government Provisional Order Confirmation (Colne Valley Sewerage Board) Act 1956	4 & 5 Eliz. 2. c. xxxix	28 March 1956
An Act to confirm a Provisional Order of the Minister of Housing and Local Government relating to the Colne Valley Sewerage Board.
	Colne Valley Sewerage (No. 2) Order 1955 (Note: Although passed in 1956, the short title is specified as the Colne Valley Sewerage (No. 2) Order 1955.) Provisional Order altering a local act. (Note: Hertfordshire County Council (Colne Valley Sewerage, &c.) Act 1937 (1 Edw. 8 & 1 Geo. 6. c. lxxxix))	
Gloucestershire County Council Act 1956	4 & 5 Eliz. 2. c. xl	28 March 1956
An Act to empower the Gloucestershire County Council to demolish the concert hall forming part of the shire hall of the county and to use the space thereof for building purposes to confer further powers on the Gloucestershire County Council and local authorities in the county of Gloucester in relation to lands and highways and the local government improvement health and finances of the county to enact provisions with respect to hairdressers' and barbers' premises and public entertainments to make further provision for the superannuation of employees and for other purposes.
Swansea Corporation (Fairwood Common) Act 1956	4 & 5 Eliz. 2. c. xli	28 March 1956
An Act to make provision for the extinguishment of certain common or commonable rights and other rights in respect of part of Fairwood Common in the county of Glamorgan and for the determination payment and apportionment of the compensation money payable in respect of such extinguishment to extend the powers conferred on the mayor aldermen and burgesses of the county borough of Swansea by the Civil Aviation Act 1949 (Note: Civil Aviation Act 1949 (12, 13 & 14 Geo. 6. c. 67)) and for other purposes.
Roxburgh County Council (Ale Water) Order Confirmation Act 1956	4 & 5 Eliz. 2. c. xlii	17 May 1956
An Act to confirm a Provisional Order under the Private Legislation Procedure (Scotland) Act 1936 relating to Roxburgh County Council (Ale Water).
	Roxburgh County Council (Ale Water) Order 1956 Provisional Order to exempt the county council of the county of Roxburgh from certain provisions of the Salmon Fisheries (Scotland) Act 1868 to repeal the provisions of the Kelso Water Order 1911 relating to the supply of water to the Kelso District Committee and for other purposes.	
Castle Gate Congregational Church Burial Ground (Nottingham) Act 1956	4 & 5 Eliz. 2. c. xliii	17 May 1956
An Act to authorise the removal of restrictions attaching to the Castle Gate Congregational Church Burial Ground in the city of Nottingham to declare that the trustees of such burial ground have power to sell lands comprising a part thereof to authorise the erection of buildings on the said lands and for other purposes.
Ipswich Dock Act 1956	4 & 5 Eliz. 2. c. xliv	17 May 1956
An Act to empower the Ipswich Dock Commission to increase their borrowing powers and for other purposes.
Saint Stephen Walbrook (Saint Antholin's Churchyard) Act 1956	4 & 5 Eliz. 2. c. xlv	17 May 1956
An Act to authorise the sale of the churchyard known as Saint Antholin's Churchyard to authorise the erection of buildings on such churchyard and for other purposes.
Elder Yard Chapel Chesterfield Act 1956	4 & 5 Eliz. 2. c. xlvi	17 May 1956
An Act to enable the Trustees of the Elder Yard Chapel Chesterfield in the county of Derby to sell part of the burial ground appurtenant thereto free from restrictions and for other purposes.
Tees Conservancy Act 1956 (repealed)	4 & 5 Eliz. 2. c. xlvii	17 May 1956
An Act to alter the constitution of the Tees Conservancy Commissioners to make further provision with respect to elected Commissioners and the scale of voting at elections of Commissioners by dues payers for the ports of the Tees and for other purposes. (Repealed by Tees and Hartlepools Port Authority Act 1966 (c. xxv))
Barry Corporation (Barry Harbour) Act 1956	4 & 5 Eliz. 2. c. xlviii	17 May 1956
An Act to authorise the transfer to the mayor aldermen and burgesses of the borough of Barry of a portion of Barry Harbour now vested in the British Transport Commission and for other purposes.
Leicester Corporation Act 1956	4 & 5 Eliz. 2. c. xlix	17 May 1956
An Act to confer further powers upon the lord mayor aldermen and citizens of the city of Leicester with reference to lands streets and buildings and the local government health improvement and finances of the city to confer further powers upon them and to make further provision with reference to their transport water markets and cemetery undertakings to enact provisions with reference to public entertainments and the welfare of aged persons to empower the Corporation to establish an undertaking for the supply of heat to premises and for other purposes.
City of London (Various Powers) Act 1956	4 & 5 Eliz. 2. c. l	17 May 1956
An Act to make further provision with respect to superannuation street traffic the lands forming Epping Forest and with respect to the tolls paid in the London Central Markets and for other purposes.
Sion College Act 1956 (repealed)	4 & 5 Eliz. 2. c. li	17 May 1956
An Act to reconstitute and confer new powers upon Sion College within the city of London and for other purposes. (Repealed by Sion College Act 1981 (c. xiv))
Pontypool Water Act 1956	4 & 5 Eliz. 2. c. lii	17 May 1956
An Act to change the name of the Pontypool Gas and Water Company to provide for the transfer of certain of the British Gas three per centum Guaranteed Stock 1990-95 to the existing stockholders of the Company and for the consolidation of the existing ordinary capital to confer further powers upon the Company and for other purposes.
Frances Barker and certain other Charities (City of York) Scheme Confirmation Act 1956	4 & 5 Eliz. 2. c. liii	5 July 1956
An Act to confirm a Scheme of the Charity Commissioners for the application or management of the Charity of Frances Barker and certain other Charities in the City of York.
	Scheme for the Application or Management of the following Charities, being certain of the Municipal Charities, in the City of York, which Charities are comprised in one or more Schemes of the Charity Commissioners dated the 14th March 1902, 18th August 1916, 9th August 1921, 30th June 1922, 17th June 1923, 24th February 1925, 20th January 1933, 28th February 1936, 17th March 1939, 3rd October 1941 and 1st February 1952:—: 1. The Charity of Frances Barker for Non-Educational Purposes; 2. The Charity of Sir Martin Bowes; 3. The Charity of George Buck; 4. The Charity known as St. Catherine's Hospital (including the subsidiary Charities of John Hartley, James Luntley, Henry Myers, Green Simpson and Charles Yates); 5. Clifton Parish Land Charity; 6. Cordwainers' Pension Charity (including the subsidiary Charity of Mark Buller); 7. The Charity of James Cotterill; 8. The Charity Known as the Cremitt Money; 9. The Charity of Fabian Farley; 10. The Charity of Lancelot Foster; 11. The Charity called The Thomas Fothergill Home for Working Men; 12. The Charity called The Thomas Fothergill Home for Working Women; 13. The Charity of Rawlins Gould; 14. The Charity of John Hartley; 15. The Charity of Landy Sarah Hewley; 16. The Charity of Christopher Hutton for Non-Educational Purposes; 17. The Charity known as Sir Arthur Ingram's Hospital (including the subsidiary Charity of Eve Atkinson); 18. The Charity of the Reverend Charles Jackson; 19. The Charity of Peter Johnson; 20. The Charity of Bridget Lawrence; 21. The Charity of Arthur Lawson; 22. The Charity of Doctor Joseph Loveland; 23. The Charity consisting of the three gifts of James Melrose; 24. The Charity called Mrs. Ann Middleton's Hospital (including the subsidiary Charities of Stephen Beckwith, John Richard and Edward Hill, Mary Winfield Lambert, William Monckton, Thomas Norfolk, Frances Pool, Green Simpson and George Townend); 25. The Charity of Mary Musgrave; 26. The Charity of Henry Myers; 27. The Charity of Richard North; 28. The Charity of Richard Pickard; 29. The Charity of Catherine Ramsden for Non-Educational purposes; 30. The Charity of Thomas Rogerson; 31. The Charity known as the York Soup Kitchen; 32. The Charity known as the Terry Memorial Homes; 33. The Charity known as St. Thomas' Hospital (including the subsidiary Charities of Stephen Beckwith, John Hartley, James Luntley, Green Simpson and George Townend); 34. Sir Henry Thompson's Pension Charity (including the subsidiary Charities of John Girdler and Thomas Norfolk); 35. The Charity known as Turners Gift; 36. The Charity of John Vaux; 37. The Charity of Thomas Harry Walker; 38. The Charity of Ann Watson; 39. The Charity known as Sir Robert Watter's Hospital (including the subsidiary Charity of Marion Bellerby); 40. The Charity known as Sir Robert Watter's Gift; 41. The Charity of William Weddall; 42. The Charity of Sir Thomas White; 43. The Charity known as Whiteheads Gift; 44. The Charity called the Sisters Wilson's Home; 45. The Charity of James Woodhouse; 46. The Charity of William Wright.	
Consolidated Municipal Charity and certain other Charities (Ludlow) Scheme Confirmation Act 1956	4 & 5 Eliz. 2. c. liv	5 July 1956
An Act to confirm a Scheme of the Charity Commissioners for the application or management of the Charity known as the Consolidated Municipal Charity and certain other Charities in the Borough of Ludlow in the County of Salop.
	Scheme for the Application or Management of the following Charities, in the Borough of Ludlow, in the County of Salop:—: 1. The Consolidated Municipal Charity (including the Charities of Margaret Philips, Thomas Botfield, Emily Felton, Maria Alicia Johanna Nightingale and William Page), regulated by a Scheme of the Charity Commissioners of the 20th March 1914, as varied by Schemes of the said Commissioners of the 1st April 1921 and the 5th October 1937; 2. The Minor Charities, regulated by a Scheme of the Charity Commissioners of the 28th June 1918 and comprising—; 1. The Charity of Thomas Hollingsworth; 2. The Charity of Edmund Jones; 3. The Charity of Eleanor Handford; 4. The Charity of John Long; 5. The Charity of Evan Phillips; 6. The Charity of Mrs. Robinson; 7. The Charity of Richard Nash; 8. The Charity of Janns Brettell Vaughan; 9. The Charity of Sarah Owen; 10. The Charity of William Archer; 11. The Charity of Mary Betenson; 12. The Charity of Thomas Candland; 13. The Charity of Susan Gay (commonly called Plummer's Money); 14. The Charity of Morgan Lloyd; 15. The Charity of Ann Smith; 16. The Charity of James Walter; 17. The Charity of Alderman Richard Davies; 18. The Charity of Thomas Lane; 19. The Charity of Doctor Charles Sonnibank; 20. The Charity of Sir Timothy Tourneur; 21. The Charity of Alderman Thomas Meyricke; 3. The Charity of Alfred Lloyd, founded by will proved at Oxford on the 20th January 1951 and administered in connexion with the above-mentioned Minor Charities.	
Hospital of Robert Earl of Leicester Charity (Warwick) Scheme Confirmation Act 1956	4 & 5 Eliz. 2. c. lv	5 July 1956
An Act to confirm a Scheme of the Charity Commissioners for the application or management of the Charity called the Hospital of Robert Earl of Leicester in Warwick in the County of Warwick.
	Scheme for the application or management of the charity called the Hospital of Robert Earl of Leicester, in Warwick, in the County of Warwick, comprised in the following instruments:— Act of Parliament 13 Eliz. 1 c. XVII; (Note: Earl of Leicester's Hospital Act 1571 (13 Eliz. 1. c. 17)) Deed dated the 21st November 1585; Ordinances, Statutes and Rules made by Robert Earl of Leicester on the 26th November 1585; Deed dated the 30th November 1585; Two Deeds both dated the 6th June 1589; Act of Parliament 39 Eliz. I c. 5 (private); (Note: Earl of Leicester's Hospital Act 1597 (39 Eliz. 1. c. 5 Pr.)) Act of Parliament 53 Geo. III c. 213 (Local and Personal); (Note: Earl of Leicester's Hospital, Warwick Act 1813 (53 Geo. 3. c. ccxiii)) The Robert Earl of Leicester's Hospital Charity Scheme Confirmation Act 1926; including the Subsidiary Endowment thereof known as the Louisa Helen Trollope Gift, comprised in a Deed of Gift dated the 16th December 1901.	
Sutton's Hospital (Charterhouse) Charity Scheme Confirmation Act 1956 (repealed)	4 & 5 Eliz. 2. c. lvi	5 July 1956
An Act to confirm a Scheme of the Charity Commissioners for the application or management of the Charity called Sutton's Hospital in Charterhouse in the County of London. (Repealed by Statute Law (Repeals) Act 2013 (c. 2))
	Sutton's Hospital (Charterhouse) Charity Scheme 1956	
Advocates' Widows' Fund Order Confirmation Act 1956 (repealed)	4 & 5 Eliz. 2. c. lvii	5 July 1956
An Act to confirm a Provisional Order under the Private Legislation Procedure (Scotland) Act 1936 relating to the Advocates' Widows' Fund. (Repealed by Advocates' Widows' and Orphans' Fund Order Confirmation Act 1968 (c. xliv) (Note: Incorrectly cited as "Advocates' Widows' and Orphans' Fund O.Confn. 1968 (c.xiv)" in the Chronological Table of Local Acts.))
	Advocates' Widows' Fund Order 1956 Provisional Order for amending and extending the Act 11 Geo. 4 c. xli (local) intituled "An Act to raise a Fund for Provisions to Widows of the Members of the Faculty of Advocates of Scotland" (Note: Advocates' Widows' Fund Act 1830 (11 Geo. 4 & 1 Will. 4. c. xli)) with respect to the investment of the said Fund and for other purposes.	
Glasgow Corporation Order Confirmation Act 1956	4 & 5 Eliz. 2. c. lviii	5 July 1956
An Act to confirm a Provisional Order under the Private Legislation Procedure (Scotland) Act 1936 relating to Glasgow Corporation.
	Glasgow Corporation Order 1956 Provisional Order to amend the provisions of the Glasgow Police Act 1866 (Note: Glasgow Police Act 1866 (29 & 30 Vict. c. cclxxiii)) as to hackney carriages and the drivers thereof to extend the time for the compulsory purchase of lands for certain purposes by the corporation of the city of Glasgow to authorise the Corporation to borrow money for their tramway undertaking to make provision as to the powers of the Trustees of the Ure Elder Fund for Indigent Widow Ladies and for other purposes.	
Dover Corporation Act 1956 (repealed)	4 & 5 Eliz. 2. c. lix	5 July 1956
An Act to repeal and amend certain provisions of the Dover Corporation (Sea Defences) Act 1877 (Note: Dover Corporation (Sea Defences) Act 1877 (40 & 41 Vict. c. cxiii)) to repeal certain provisions of the Dover Corporation Act 1936 (Note: Dover Corporation Act 1936 (26 Geo. 5 & 1 Edw. 8. c. cxix)) to make further provision with regard to the local government of the borough of Dover and for other purposes. (Repealed by County of Kent Act 1981 (c. xviii))
Bristol Corporation Act 1956	4 & 5 Eliz. 2. c. lx	5 July 1956
An Act to authorise the lord mayor aldermen and burgesses of the city of Bristol to increase certain of the maximum rates dues tolls and charges leviable in respect of their dock undertaking to confer further powers upon them with reference to their dock undertaking and for other purposes.
North East Surrey Crematorium Board Act 1956	4 & 5 Eliz. 2. c. lxi	5 July 1956
An Act to constitute a join board comprising representatives of the mayor aldermen and burgesses of the Borough of Sutton and Cheam and the mayor alderman and councillors of the metropolitan borough of Battersea and the urban district councils of Carshalton and Merton and Morden to authorise the Board to provide and maintain a crematorium and for other purposes.
London County Council (Money) Act 1956	4 & 5 Eliz. 2. c. lxii	5 July 1956
An Act to regulate the expenditure on London capital account and lending of money by the London County Council during the financial period from the first day of April nineteen hundred and fifty-six to the thirtieth day of September nineteen hundred and fifty-seven; and for other purposes.
Bournemouth-Swanage Motor Road and Ferry Act 1956	4 & 5 Eliz. 2. c. lxiii	5 July 1956
An Act to empower the Bournemouth-Swanage Motor Road and Ferry Company to raise additional capital to confer further powers on the Company and for other purposes.
Bedford Corporation Act 1956 (repealed)	4 & 5 Eliz. 2. c. lxiv	5 July 1956
An Act to make further provision with regard to the letting of houses in the borough of Bedford and for other purposes. (Repealed by Statute Law (Repeals) Act 1995 (c. 44))
Scottish Union and National Insurance Company's Act 1956	4 & 5 Eliz. 2. c. lxv	5 July 1956
An Act to repeal the Scottish Union and National Insurance Company's Acts 1878 to 1939 to confer powers on the Company with respect to the carrying on of its business and the regulation of its affairs and for other purposes.
Tyne Tunnel Act 1956	4 & 5 Eliz. 2. c. lxvi	5 July 1956
An Act to authorise a variation of certain works authorised by the Tyne Tunnel Act 1946 (Note: Tyne Tunnel Act 1946 (9 & 10 Geo. 6. c. xl)) and to extend the time for the construction of certain other works authorised by that Act to confer further borrowing and other powers on the Durham County Council and on the Northumberland County Council to empower the Councils to discontinue and abandon the ferry across the river Tyne known as the Jarrow-Howdon Ferry and for other purposes.
People's Dispensary for Sick Animals Act 1956	4 & 5 Eliz. 2. c. lxvii	5 July 1956
An Act to amend the People's Dispensary for Sick Animals Act 1949 (Note: People's Dispensary for Sick Animals Act 1949 (12, 13 & 14 Geo. 6. c. xv)) to confer further powers on the People's Dispensary for Sick Animals and for other purposes.
London Necropolis Act 1956	4 & 5 Eliz. 2. c. lxviii	5 July 1956
An Act to confer further powers upon the London Necropolis Company Limited and for other purposes.
Millport Piers (Amendment) Order Confirmation Act 1956	4 & 5 Eliz. 2. c. lxix	2 August 1956
An Act to confirm a Provisional Order under the Private Legislation Procedure (Scotland) Act 1936 relating to Millport Piers (Amendment).
	Millport Piers (Amendment) Order 1956 Provisional Order to amend the provisions of the Millport Piers and Burgh Extension Order 1905 relating to the charges rates and dues for the use of each of Millport Pier and Harbour and Keppel Pier to authorise the Town Council of Millport to borrow further moneys for the general purposes of their undertaking and for other purposes.	
Aberdeen Harbour Order Confirmation Act 1956 (repealed)	4 & 5 Eliz. 2. c. lxx	2 August 1956
An Act to confirm a Provisional Order under the Private Legislation Procedure (Scotland) Act 1936 relating to Aberdeen Harbour. (Repealed by Aberdeen Harbour Order Confirmation Act 1960 (9 & 10 Eliz. 2. c. i))
	Aberdeen Harbour Order 1956 Provisional Order to extend the period of duration of the Aberdeen Harbour Acts 1895 to 1953.	
Pier and Harbour Order (Great Yarmouth Port and Haven) Confirmation Act 1956	4 & 5 Eliz. 2. c. lxxi	2 August 1956
An Act to confirm a Provisional Order made by the Minister of Transport and Civil Aviation under the General Pier and Harbour Act 1861 (Note: General Pier and Harbour Act 1861 (24 & 25 Vict. c. 45)) relating Great Yarmouth Port and Haven.
	Great Yarmouth Port and Haven Order 1956 Provisional Order to authorise the Great Yarmouth Port and Haven Commissioners to borrow further moneys and for other purposes.	
Pier and Harbour Order (Wisbech Port and Harbour) Confirmation Act 1956	4 & 5 Eliz. 2. c. lxxii	2 August 1956
An Act to confirm a Provisional Order made by the Minister of Transport and Civil Aviation under the General Pier and Harbour Act 1861 relating to Wisbech Port and Harbour.
	Wisbech Port and Harbour Order 1956 Provisional Order to make further provision for the management of the Port and Harbour of Wisbech and for other purposes.	
Huddersfield Corporation Act 1956 (repealed)	4 & 5 Eliz. 2. c. lxxiii	2 August 1956
An Act to make further provision with regard to the improvement health local government and finances of the borough of Huddersfield and for other purposes. (Repealed by West Yorkshire Act 1980 (c. xiv))
British Transport Commission Act 1956	4 & 5 Eliz. 2. c. lxxiv	2 August 1956
An Act to empower the British Transport Commission to construct works and to acquire lands; to make provision with respect to the River Kennet Navigation and the Kennet and Avon Canal; to authorise the closing for navigation of certain inland waterways and the supply of water from the Lancaster Canal; to transfer a light railway to the Admiralty; to extend the time for the compulsory purchase of certain lands and the completion of certain works; to confer further powers on the Commission; and for other purposes.
Leeds Corporation Act 1956	4 & 5 Eliz. 2. c. lxxv	2 August 1956
An Act to extend the boundary of the City of Leeds; to confer further powers upon the Lord Mayor Aldermen and Citizens of the City of Leeds with reference to lands and to their undertakings; to empower them to establish an undertaking for the supply of heat; to make further provision for the improvement health local government and finances of the city; and for other purposes.
Croydon Corporation Act 1956	4 & 5 Eliz. 2. c. lxxvi	2 August 1956
An Act to authorise the mayor aldermen and burgesses of the borough of Croydon to construct street works and to purchase lands compulsorily for those and other purposes to make further provision for the health local government improvement and finances of the borough to provide for the variation of certain agreements relating to the reception and treatment of sewage and to make further provision with regard to sewerage and the prevention of flooding and for other purposes.
London County Council (General Powers) Act 1956	4 & 5 Eliz. 2. c. lxxvii	2 August 1956
An Act to confer further powers upon the London County Council and other authorities to alter the boundary between the administrative counties of London and Surrey and for other purposes.
Rugby Corporation Act 1956 (repealed)	4 & 5 Eliz. 2. c. lxxviii	2 August 1956
An Act to empower the Mayor Aldermen and Burgesses of the borough of Rugby to continue and maintain waterworks and works for delivering water into the Oxford Canal of the British Transport Commission and to acquire lands; to enact provisions for the protection from pollution of the waters in the Cosford Feeder of the Oxford Canal and in the River Swift; and for other purposes. (Repealed by Statute Law (Repeals) Act 1995 (c. 44))
Chertsey Urban District Council Act 1956 (repealed)	4 & 5 Eliz. 2. c. lxxix	2 August 1956
An Act to regulate and control the burial grounds and cemeteries in the urban district of Chertsey to make further and better provision for the health local government improvement and finances of the urban district and for other purposes. (Repealed by Surrey Act 1985 (c. iii))
Manchester Ship Canal Act 1956	4 & 5 Eliz. 2. c. lxxx	2 August 1956
An Act to empower the Manchester Ship Canal Company to execute works and to acquire lands to extend the time limited for the construction by the Company of certain railways to increase certain tolls rates and charges leviable by the Company to confer further powers upon the Company of borrowing money and to enact other financial provisions to confer further powers with regard to the superannuation fund of the Company and the payment of pensions and benefits to confer further powers upon the Company and for other purposes.
Newcastle-upon-Tyne Corporation Act 1956 (repealed)	4 & 5 Eliz. 2. c. lxxxi	2 August 1956
An Act to confer further powers upon the lord mayor aldermen and citizens of the city and county of Newcastle upon Tyne and the stewards and wardens committee of the Town Moor in the city in relation to the Town Moor to confer further powers upon the Corporation in relation to the local government health improvement and finances of the city and for other purposes. (Repealed by Newcastle-upon-Tyne Town Moor Act 1988 (c. xxxi))
Liverpool Overhead Railway Act 1956	4 & 5 Eliz. 2. c. lxxxii	2 August 1956
An Act to provide for the closing of the Liverpool overhead railway and for the winding up and dissolution of the Liverpool Overhead Railway Company to confirm an agreement between the Company and the Mersey Docks and Harbour Board and for other purposes.
Manchester Corporation Act 1956	4 & 5 Eliz. 2. c. lxxxiii	2 August 1956
An Act to make provision for the transfer of the Manchester Municipal College of Technology to the Manchester College of Science and Technology to make further provision in reference to the water undertaking of the Corporation and for the improvement health local government and finances of the city and for other purposes.
Walthamstow Corporation Act 1956	4 & 5 Eliz. 2. c. lxxxiv	2 August 1956
An Act to confer further powers on the mayor aldermen and burgesses of the borough of Walthamstow with regard to lands and street trading to make further provision for the improvement health and local government of the borough and for other purposes.
Barnsley Corporation Act 1956	4 & 5 Eliz. 2. c. lxxxv	2 August 1956
An Act to authorise the mayor aldermen and burgesses of the county borough of Barnsley to construct additional waterworks and to acquire lands to extend their limits for the supply of water and to transfer and vest in the said mayor aldermen and burgesses the water undertaking of the urban district council of Penistone and other works to make further provision with respect to the improvement health and local government of the borough and for other purposes.
Rhyl Urban District Council Act 1956 (repealed)	4 & 5 Eliz. 2. c. lxxxvi	2 August 1956
An Act to confer further powers on the urban district council of Rhyl in regard to lands to make further and better provision for the health local government improvement and finances of the urban district to make provision with respect to the registration of premises in the urban district used for the conduct of sales by auction and for other purposes. (Repealed by Clwyd County Council Act 1985 (c. xliv))
Fylde Water Board Act 1956	4 & 5 Eliz. 2. c. lxxxvii	2 August 1956
An Act to amend the enactments relating to the discharge of compensation water by the Fylde Water Board to confer further powers upon that Board and for other purposes.
Felixstowe Dock and Railway Act 1956	4 & 5 Eliz. 2. c. lxxxviii	2 August 1956
An Act to empower the Felixstowe Dock and Railway Company to construct new works to define and extend the limits of the dock to make provision with respect to the rates leviable by the Company in respect of the dock to convert the existing share capital into stock and to authorise the raising of additional capital by the Company to re-enact with amendments certain provisions relating to the Company and to confer further powers on the Company and for other purposes.
Heywood and Middleton Water Act 1956	4 & 5 Eliz. 2. c. lxxxix	2 August 1956
An Act to authorise the Heywood and Middleton Water Board to construct additional waterworks and to acquire lands to confer further powers upon the Board and for other purposes.
Middlesex County Council Act 1956	4 & 5 Eliz. 2. c. xc	2 August 1956
An Act to make further provision for the disposal of sewage in the county of Middlesex and parts of adjoining counties to confer further powers upon the Middlesex County Council and the local authorities in Middlesex in relation to the health local government improvement and finances of the county and the boroughs and districts therein and for other purposes.
Cammell Laird and Company Act 1956	4 & 5 Eliz. 2. c. xci	2 August 1956
An Act to empower Cammell Laird and Company (Shipbuilders and Engineers) Limited to acquire Rock Ferry Pier and to construct new works in the river Mersey and for other purposes.
Mersey Docks and Harbour Board Act 1956	4 & 5 Eliz. 2. c. xcii	2 August 1956
An Act to authorise the Mersey Docks and Harbour Board to construct further works and for other purposes.
Grayson Rollo and Clover Docks Act 1956	4 & 5 Eliz. 2. c. xciii	2 August 1956
An Act to empower Grayson Rollo and Clover Docks Limited to construct new works on the river Mersey and for other purposes.
South of Scotland Electricity Order Confirmation Act 1956	4 & 5 Eliz. 2. c. xciv	5 November 1956
An Act to confirm a Provisional Order under the Private Legislation Procedure (Scotland) Act 1936 relating to South of Scotland Electricity.
	South of Scotland Electricity Order 1956 Provisional Order to consolidate the local enactments applying to the South of Scotland Electricity Board with such amendments as are required to facilitate consolidation and secure a uniform statutory code applicable throughout the South of Scotland District to confer further powers on the said Board and for other purposes.	

=== Private and personal acts ===
Short title	Citation	Royal assent
Long title
Willoughby de Broke Estate Act 1956	4 & 5 Eliz. 2. c. 2 Pr.	28 March 1956
An Act for enabling the settled estates of Lord Willoughby de Broke to be disentailed and to enable capital moneys to be raised out of the said settled estates and for other purposes connected with those estates.

=== Sources ===
- The Journals of the House of Commons (PDF). Vol. 211 (June 1955 – November 1956). pp. 3–432 – via parliament.uk.
- Chronological Table of the Statutes: Covering the Period from 1235 to the End of 1971. London: Her Majesty's Stationery Office. 1972. pp. 1108–1119. ISBN 978-0-11-840096-1 – via Google Books.
- "UK Public General Acts from 1956". legislation.gov.uk. The National Archives.
- "UK Local Acts from 1956". legislation.gov.uk. The National Archives.
- "UK Private and Personal Acts from 1956". legislation.gov.uk. The National Archives.
- "Chronological Tables of Local Acts: Part 178 (1954-1956)". legislation.gov.uk. The National Archives.
- "Chronological Tables of the Private and Personal Acts: Part 33 (1910-1987)". legislation.gov.uk. The National Archives.

== 5 & 6 Eliz. 2 ==
The second session of the 41st Parliament of the United Kingdom, which met from 6 November 1956 until 1 November 1957.

=== Public general acts ===
Short title	Citation	Royal assent
Long title
Police, Fire and Probation Officers Remuneration Act 1956 (repealed)	5 & 6 Eliz. 2. c. 1	28 November 1956
An Act to authorise retrospective provision to be made for the remuneration of members of police forces and fire brigades and of probation officers. (Repealed by Fire Services Act 1959 (7 & 8 Eliz. 2. c. 44), Police Act 1964 (c. 48), Police (Scotland) Act 1967 (c. 77), Social Work (Scotland) Act 1968 (c. 49) and Criminal Law Act 1977 (c. 45))
Hydrocarbon Oil Duties (Temporary Increase) Act 1956 (repealed)	5 & 6 Eliz. 2. c. 2	20 December 1956
An Act to increase the duties of customs and excise chargeable on hydrocarbon oils, petrol substitutes, and spirits used for making power methylated spirits and, in connection therewith, to enable certain fares to be increased. (Repealed by Finance (No. 2) Act 1964 (c. 92))
Air Corporations Act 1956 (repealed)	5 & 6 Eliz. 2. c. 3	20 December 1956
An Act to increase the borrowing powers of the British Overseas Airways Corporation and the British European Airways Corporation; and for purposes connected with the matter aforesaid. (Repealed by Air Corporations Act 1966 (c. 11))
Expiring Laws Continuance Act 1956 (repealed)	5 & 6 Eliz. 2. c. 4	20 December 1956
An Act to continue certain expiring laws. (Repealed by Statute Law Revision Act 1963 (c. 30))
Agriculture (Silo Subsidies) Act 1956 (repealed)	5 & 6 Eliz. 2. c. 5	20 December 1956
An Act to make provision for the payment of subsidies in respect of the construction or improvement of silos. (Repealed by Statute Law (Repeals) Act 2004 (c. 14))

=== Local acts ===
Short title	Citation	Royal assent
Long title
Clyde Navigation Order Confirmation Act 1956 (repealed)	5 & 6 Eliz. 2. c. i	28 November 1956
An Act to confirm a Provisional Order under the Private Legislation Procedure (Scotland) Act 1936 (Note: Private Legislation Procedure (Scotland) Act 1936 (26 Geo. 5 & 1 Edw. 8. c. 52)) relating to Clyde Navigation. (Repealed by Statute Law (Repeals) Act 1986 (c. 12))
	Clyde Navigation Order 1956 Provisional Order to extend the period for the compulsory purchase of certain lands by the Trustees of the Clyde Navigation and for other purposes.	
Oban Burgh Order Confirmation Act 1956	5 & 6 Eliz. 2. c. ii	28 November 1956
An Act to confirm a Provisional Order under the Private Legislation Procedure (Scotland) Act 1936 relating to Oban Burgh.
	Oban Burgh Order 1956 Provisional Order to authorise the Corporation of the burgh of Oban to borrow moneys for the purposes of the Oban Piers and Harbour Orders 1862 to 1921 and for other purposes.	

=== Sources ===
- The Journals of the House of Commons (PDF). Vol. 212 (November 1956 – November 1957). pp. 3–303 – via parliament.uk.
- Chronological Table of the Statutes: Covering the Period from 1235 to the End of 1971. London: Her Majesty's Stationery Office. 1972. p. 1119. ISBN 978-0-11-840096-1 – via Google Books.
- "UK Public General Acts from 1956". legislation.gov.uk. The National Archives.
- "UK Local Acts from 1956". legislation.gov.uk. The National Archives.
- "Chronological Tables of Local Acts: Part 179 (1956-1958)". legislation.gov.uk. The National Archives.

== See also ==
- List of acts of the Parliament of the United Kingdom
