= Police (Scotland) Act 1967 =

Act of the Parliament of the United Kingdom

Police (Scotland) Act 1967 (Note: Section 53(1).)
- Act of Parliament
- Parliament of the United Kingdom
- Long title: An Act to consolidate certain enactments relating to police forces in Scotland and to the execution of warrants in the border counties of England and Scotland and to repeal certain provisions relating to the police in Scotland which have ceased to have any effect.
- Citation: 1967 c. 77
- Territorial extent: Scotland (Note: But see section 53(2).)

Dates
- Royal assent: 27 July 1967
- Commencement: 27 October 1967 (Note: Section 53(3).)
- Repealed: 1 April 2013
Other legislation
Amends	See § Repealed enactments
Repeals/revokes	See § Repealed enactments
Amended by	Firearms Act 1968; Statute Law (Repeals) Act 1973; Police Pensions Act 1976; Interpretation Act 1978; Overseas Development and Co-operation Act 1980; Road Traffic Regulation Act 1984; Police Act 1996; Anti-terrorism, Crime and Security Act 2001
Repealed by	Police and Fire Reform (Scotland) Act 2012
Relates to	Police Act 1964

Status: Repealed

Text of statute as originally enacted

Revised text of statute as amended

The Police (Scotland) Act 1967 (c. 77) was an act of the Parliament of the United Kingdom which until 2013 provided a framework for territorial police forces in Scotland to operate within. The Police and Fire Reform (Scotland) Act 2012, passed by the Scottish Parliament set out arrangements for organisations to replace those set out in this act.

The act did not generally apply to any police force operating in Scotland whose jurisdiction is not defined by either local authority boundaries or by the national boundary of Scotland; certain individual sections deal with the necessary exercise of some police powers by specified non-Scottish or all-United Kingdom forces.

All justice matters are devolved to the Scottish Government under the Scotland Act 1998, however, and Scotland has (and always has had) its own civil and criminal legal systems quite separate and distinct from those in England and Wales.

The act lead to the repeal of Police (Scotland) Act 1956 (4 & 5 Eliz. 2. c. 26). This act also repealed the whole of Police (Scotland) Act 1966.

== Provisions ==
=== Preamble ===
"An Act to consolidate certain enactments relating to police forces in Scotland and to the execution of warrants in the border counties of England and Scotland and to repeal certain provisions relating to the police in Scotland which have ceased to have any effect."

=== Section 41 ===
See Assaulting a constable in the execution of his duty.

=== Repealed enactments ===
Section 52(2) of the act repealed 41 enactments, listed in parts I and II of schedule 5 to the act.

Part I – Enactments Consolidated
Citation	Short title	Extent of repeal
34 & 35 Vict. c. 96	Pedlars Act 1871	In section 3, the definition of "chief officer of police". In Schedule 1, the definition of "chief officer of police".
34 & 35 Vict. c. 112	Prevention of Crimes Act 1871	In section 20, the definition of "chief officer of police".
38 & 39 Vict. c. 17	Explosives Act 1875	In section 107, the definition of "chief officer of police". In section 109, paragraph (7).
46 & 47 Vict. c. 34	Cheap Trains Act 1883	In section 8, the definition of "police force".
6 Edw. 7. c. 32	Dogs Act 1906	In section 3(10), the definitions of "chief officer of police" and "police fund". Section 8(a).
9 Edw. 7. c. 30	Cinematograph Act 1909	In section 2(6), the definition of "chief officer of police". Section 8(2).
4 & 5 Geo. 5. c. 34	Police Reservists (Allowances) Act 1914	In section 1(5), the definitions of "police force" and "police fund". In section 2, the words from "with the substitution" to "Police Act 1890".
11 & 12 Geo. 5. c. 31	Police Pensions Act 1921	In section 30, the definitions of "chief officer of police", "police fund" and "police force". In Schedule 3, the definitions of "chief officer of police" and "police fund".
1 Edw. 8 & 1 Geo. 6. c. 6	Public Order Act 1936	In section 9(1), the definition of "chief officer of police".
1 Edw. 8 & 1 Geo. 6. c. 12	Firearms Act 1937	In section 32(1), the definition of "chief officer of police".
2 & 3 Geo. 6. c. 44	House to House Collections Act 1939	In section 11(1), the definition of "chief officer of police".
2 & 3 Geo. 6. c. 103	Police and Firemen (War Service) Act 1939	In section 10(3), the definition of "chief officer of a police force". In section 14, in the definition of "constable" the words "within the meaning of the Police Pensions Act 1921".
10 & 11 Geo. 6. c. 41	Fire Services Act 1947	In section 38(1), the definitions of "chief officer of police" and "police force".
12, 13 & 14 Geo. 6. c. 5	Civil Defence Act 1948	In section 9(1), the definition of "police force".
12, 13 & 14 Geo. 6. c. 67	Civil Aviation Act 1949	In Schedule 6, paragraph 8(4).
12, 13 & 14 Geo. 6. c. 68	Representation of the People Act 1949	Section 87(3), except so far as it relates to the definition of a police area.
14 Geo. 6. c. 36	Diseases of Animals Act 1950	In section 86(2), the definition of "police force".
14 & 15 Geo. 6. c. 65	Reserve and Auxiliary Forces (Protection of Civil Interests) Act 1951	In section 23(1), the definition of "police force". In section 24(g), the words "for references to the Police Act 1946" and the words "there shall be respectively substituted references to the Police (Scotland) Act 1946".
4 & 5 Eliz. 2. c. 26	Police (Scotland) Act 1956	The whole act except section 37.
5 Eliz. 2. c. 1	Police, Fire and Probation Officers Remuneration Act 1956	Section 1(1)(b).
8 & 9 Eliz. 2. c. 16	Road Traffic Act 1960	Section 202(3). In section 257(1), the definition of "chief officer of police".
1964 c. 48	Police Act 1964	In section 45, in subsection (4), the words "or under section 11 or 11A of the Police (Scotland) Act 1956", and subsection (5). Section 59. In section 65(5), the words "section 59 and Schedule 7". Schedule 7.
1966 c. 52	Police (Scotland) Act 1966	The whole act.
1967 c. 76	Road Traffic Regulation Act 1967	Section 52(9). In section 104(1), the definition of "chief officer of police".

Part II – Enactments which are Spent or Superseded
Citation	Short title	Extent of repeal
34 & 35 Vict. c. 96	Pedlars Act 1871	In section 3, the definition of "police district". In Schedule 1, the definition of "police district".
34 & 35 Vict. c. 112	Prevention of Crimes Act 1871	In section 20, the definition of "police district".
38 & 39 Vict. c. 17	Explosives Act 1875	In section 107, the definition of "police district".
46 & 47 Vict. c. 34	Cheap Trains Act 1883	In section 8, the definition of "police authority".
6 Edw. 7. c. 32	Dogs Act 1906	In section 3(10), the definition of "police area".
9 Edw. 7. c. 30	Cinematograph Act 1909	In section 2(6), the definition of "police area".
4 & 5 Geo. 5. c. 34	Police Reservists (Allowances) Act 1914	Section 1(4). In section 1(5), the definition of "police authority". In section 2, the words from "and of" to the end.
11 & 12 Geo. 5. c. 31	Police Pensions Act 1921	In section 30, the definitions of "police area" and "police authority". In Schedule 3, the definitions of "police area" and "police authority".
1 Edw. 8 & 1 Geo. 6. c. 12	Firearms Act 1937	In section 32(1), in the definition of "area" the words from "as defined" to the end.
1 Edw. 8 & 1 Geo. 6. c. 37	Children and Young Persons (Scotland) Act 1937	In section 110(1), the definition "police authority".
2 & 3 Geo. 6. c. 44	House to House Collections Act 1939	In section 11(1), the definitions of "police area" and "police authority".
2 & 3 Geo. 6. c. 103	Police and Firemen (War Service) Act 1939	In section 14, in the definition of "appropriate authority" the words "within the meaning of the Police Pensions Act 1921".
10 & 11 Geo. 6. c. 41	Fire Services Act 1947	In section 38(1), the definitions of "police area" and "police authority".
12, 13 & 14 Geo. 6. c. 68	Representation of the People Act 1949	In section 87(3), the words "and to a police area" in both places where they occur.
14 Geo. 6. c. 36	Diseases of Animals Act 1950	In section 86(2), the definition of "police area".
14 & 15 Geo. 6. c. 65	Reserve and Auxiliary Forces (Protection of Civil Interests) Act 1951	In section 23(1), in the definition of "relevant police authority" the words from "maintained" to "other police force" and the words "(within the meaning of the Police Pensions Act 1921)". In section 24(g), the words "and to an authority responsible under a scheme for the maintenance of a police force" and the words from "and to a joint police committee" to the end. In Schedule 2, in Part I, in paragraph 4, in column 2, the words from the beginning to "any other police force" and the words "(within the meaning of the Police Pensions Act 1921)".
4 & 5 Eliz. 2. c. 26	Police (Scotland) Act 1956	Section 37.
