= Prevention of Crimes Amendment Act 1885 =

Act of the Parliament of the United Kingdom

Prevention of Crimes Amendment Act 1885 (Note: Section 1.)
- Act of Parliament
- Parliament of the United Kingdom
- Long title: An Act to amend the Prevention of Crimes Act, 1871.
- Citation: 48 & 49 Vict. c. 75
- Territorial extent: England and Wales; Scotland; (Note: Section 3.)

Dates
- Royal assent: 14 August 1885
- Commencement: 14 August 1885 (Note: The Acts of Parliament (Commencement) Act 1793.)
- Repealed: Scotland: 1 January 1957; England and Wales: 1 August 1964 (Note: The Police Act 1964 (Commencement No. 1) Order 1964 (SI 1964/873).)
Other legislation
Amends	Prevention of Crimes Act 1871
Repealed by	Scotland: Police (Scotland) Act 1956; England and Wales: Police Act 1964

Status: Repealed

Text of statute as originally enacted

The Prevention of Crimes Amendment Act 1885 (48 & 49 Vict. c. 75) was an act of the Parliament of the United Kingdom. It became law on 14 August 1885.

It amended the Prevention of Crimes Act 1871 (34 & 35 Vict. c. 112), and provided that any person convicted of obstructing a constable or "peace officer" in the execution of their duty was guilty of a criminal offence against that act. This would be punishable by a penalty of £5 (2009: £350) or, failing payment, two months imprisonment with or without hard labour.

== Subsequent developments ==
The whole act was repealed for Scotland by section 38(1) of, and the third schedule to, the Police (Scotland) Act 1956 (4 & 5 Eliz. 2. c. 26), which came into force on 1 January 1957.

The whole act was repealed for England and Wales by section 64(3) of, and part I of schedule 10 to, the Police Act 1964, which came into force on 1 August 1964.

== Bibliography ==
- Oliver & Boyd's new Edinburgh almanac and national repository for the year 1886. Oliver & Boyd, Edinburgh, 1886
