= Pedlars Act 1871 =

Act of the Parliament of the United Kingdom

Pedlars Act 1871 (Note: Section 1.)
- Act of Parliament
- Parliament of the United Kingdom
- Long title: An Act for Granting Certificates to Pedlars.
- Citation: 34 & 35 Vict. c. 96
- Territorial extent: United Kingdom

Dates
- Royal assent: 21 August 1871
- Commencement: 1 January 1872 (Note: Section 2.)

Other legislation
- Repeals/revokes: Pedlars Act 1870
- Amended by: Statute Law Revision Act 1883; Pedlars Act 1881; Statute Law Revision (No. 2) Act 1893; Local Government (Scotland) Act 1947; Police Act 1964; Police (Scotland) Act 1967; Forgery and Counterfeiting Act 1981; Statute Law (Repeals) Act 1989; Statute Law (Repeals) Act 1993

Status: Amended

Text of statute as originally enacted

Revised text of statute as amended

Text of the Pedlars Act 1871 as in force today (including any amendments) within the United Kingdom, from legislation.gov.uk.

Pedlars Act 1881
- Act of Parliament
- Parliament of the United Kingdom
- Long title: An Act to amend the Pedlars Act, 1871, as regards the district within which a certificate authorises a person to act as Pedlar.
- Citation: 44 & 45 Vict. c. 45
- Territorial extent: United Kingdom

Dates
- Royal assent: 22 August 1881
- Commencement: 22 August 1881 (Note: The Acts of Parliament (Commencement) Act 1793.)

Other legislation
- Amends: Pedlars Act 1871
- Amended by: Statute Law Revision Act 1894

Status: Amended

Text of statute as originally enacted

Revised text of statute as amended

Text of the Pedlars Act 1881 as in force today (including any amendments) within the United Kingdom, from legislation.gov.uk.

The Pedlars Act 1871 (34 & 35 Vict. c. 96) is an act of the Parliament of the United Kingdom. This Act, and an amendment in the Pedlars Act 1881 (44 & 45 Vict. c. 45), applies to the United Kingdom, and provides legislation governing pedlar's certificates and the peddling trade.

== Pedlars Act 1871 and Pedlars Act 1881 ==
The Pedlars Act 1871 requires pedlars to apply to the chief constable of their local police force for a pedlar's certificate. Trading as a pedlar without a certificate is an offence.

The Pedlars Act 1871 defines a pedlar as a person who trades by travelling on foot between town to town or visits another person's house. The Act specifically exempts certain traders from being covered by the law, people selling at legitimate markets and fairs, those only seeking customer orders, and sellers of vegetables, fruit, or victuals. The Pedlars Act 1871 limited the validity of the certificate to the geographical area covered by the issuing police force, so a pedlar needed to apply for another certificate to trade in a different area. The Pedlars Act 1881 amended the 1871 Act by making a pedlar's certificate valid throughout the United Kingdom.

== Applying for a pedlar's certificate ==
An application for a pedlar's certificate is made to a police chief constable. The procedure is that the person must attend at a police station in the area they live. The criteria for issuing a certificate is that the person must have resided in the local authority area for at least 28 days and be over 17 years old. An applicant requires a photograph, proof of identity and address, and the details of a referee. The certificate is valid for a year. In 2018, the application fee is £12.25.

Trading without a certificate or allowing somebody else to use it is an offence with a maximum penalty of a fine up to £200. Providing false information when applying for a certificate, or making or carrying a forged certificate is an offence with the maximum penalty of up to six months imprisonment. The police still enforce the Act, for example, in 2017 Derbyshire Constabulary seized the goods of a pedlar trading without a certificate.

== Debates about the Pedlars Act 1871 ==
Various calls have been made to reform the pedlar laws. In 2012, the Department for Business Innovation and Skills considered reforming the pedlar laws but considered it a matter for a decision at a later date. The Association of Town & City Management say the current pedlar laws causes one of the most complex problems about on-street trading. Local shopkeepers and retailers view peddling as undesirable and unfair competition. Argued is that pedlars are not restricted where they trade and can legitimately stand outside a shop and sell the same goods as it, they cause congestion on the streets in certain city centres, and are less accountable for any counterfeit or substandard good sold by them.

Since 1999, pedlars have raised concerns about the attempt of some local government authorities to pass Private Acts to circumnavigate the current pedlar legislation and restrict their trade, for example, by enacting the City of Westminster Act 1999, and Maidstone Borough Council Act 2006.

== Subsequent developments ==
Section 13 of the act was repealed for England and Wales by section 1(1) of, and group 4 of part I of schedule 1 to, the Statute Law (Repeals) Act 1989, which came into force on 16 November 1989.

Parts of sections 3 and 20 of the act were repealed by section 1(1) of, and group 1 of part I of schedule 1 to, the Statute Law (Repeals) Act 1993, which came into force on 5 November 1993.

== See also ==
- Merchant
- Peddler
- Retail
- Street trading licence
