= Police (Scotland) Act 1857 =

Act of the Parliament of the United Kingdom

Police (Scotland) Act 1857 (Note: The citation of this act by this short title was authorised by section 1 of, and the first schedule to, the Short Titles Act 1896. Due to the repeal of those provisions it is now authorised by section 19(2) of the Interpretation Act 1978.)
- Act of Parliament
- Parliament of the United Kingdom
- Long title: An Act to render more effectual the Police in Counties and Burghs in Scotland.
- Citation: 20 & 21 Vict. c. 72
- Territorial extent: United Kingdom

Dates
- Royal assent: 25 August 1857
- Commencement: 25 August 1857 (Note: The Acts of Parliament (Commencement) Act 1793.)
- Repealed: 1 January 1957
Other legislation
Amended by	Police (Scotland) Act 1858; Statute Law Revision Act 1875; Police Act 1946; Local Government (Scotland) Act 1947; Representation of the People Act 1948; Statute Law Revision Act 1950
Repealed by	Police (Scotland) Act 1956
Relates to	Burgh Police (Scotland) Act 1833

Status: Repealed

Text of statute as originally enacted

The Police (Scotland) Act 1857 (20 & 21 Vict. c. 72) was an act of the Parliament of the United Kingdom. It was one of the Police (Scotland) Acts 1857 to 1890. The legislation made the establishment of a police force mandatory in the counties of Scotland, and also allowed existing burgh police forces to be consolidated with a county force.

== Establishment of county police forces ==
The Commissioners of Supply for each county were required to form a police committee to administer a police force for their area. The committee was to consist of not more than 15 commissioners, plus the lord lieutenant and sheriff of the county (or their deputies). The police force forces were to come into existence on 15 March 1858.

A chief constable was to be appointed to each police force by the committee. It was, however, permitted for two or more adjoining counties to appoint a single chief constable. The chief constable was to run the day-to-day activities of the force, and to appoint and dismiss constables. He was also to appoint a deputy chief constable to act in his absence.

The commissioners of supply were to levy a "police assessment" or special rate to finance the constabulary. They were also permitted to divide a county into Police Districts, with constables allocated to each district, and a separate assessment to be paid in each area.

== Jurisdiction of county constables ==
Constables of a county police force were to have full powers within their county, which was to include for policing purposes any detached parts of other counties locally situate within it. Similar provisions were made in regard to sheriffs and justices of the peace. They had jurisdiction in all harbours, lochs and bays, and in burghs within the county, and in any adjoining county.

Constables in Berwickshire, Dumfriesshire and Roxburghshire were permitted to serve warrants in the counties of Cumberland and Northumberland across the English border.

== Inspector of Constabulary ==
An Inspector of Constabulary was to be appointed to ensure that an efficient police system was being operated by the various forces in Scotland. He was to certify annually that each force was being effectively, making it eligible to payment of one quarter of its costs by the treasury.

According to the Inspector's first report in 1859, 32 counties and 57 burghs had established police forces.

== Burgh police forces ==
A number of burghs had established police forces, either under the Burgh Police (Scotland) Act 1833 (3 & 4 Will. 4. c. 46) or by local acts. The magistrates and town council of a burgh could agree with the commissioners of supply of a county to consolidate the burgh force with the county police. One or more members of the town council would be appointed to the county police committee in this case.

Conversely, the act allowed any burgh which had not yet established a police force to do so within six months of the passing of the act.

Burgh forces were also to be subject to inspection, but those unconsolidated burghs with a population of 5,000 or less were not permitted to avail of central government funds.

== Exceptions ==
The act did not automatically extend to Orkney and Shetland, although it could be applied by Order in Council on the request of the sheriff of the county.

The act did not affect any police forces employed by railway or canal companies, or established by local act of parliament.

== Subsequent developments ==
In section 18 of the act, the words " or in the militia " were repealed by section 1(1) of, and the first schedule to, the Statute Law Revision Act 1950 (14 Geo. 6. c. 6), which came into force on 23 May 1950.

The whole act was repealed by section 38(1) of, and the third schedule to, the Police (Scotland) Act 1956 (4 & 5 Eliz. 2. c. 26), which came into force on 1 January 1957.
