= Police and Firemen (War Service) Act 1939 =

Act of the Parliament of the United Kingdom

Police and Firemen (War Service) Act 1939 (Note: Section 16(1).)
- Act of Parliament
- Parliament of the United Kingdom
- Long title: An Act to make provision with respect to constables I and firemen serving in His Majesty's forces during the period of the present emergency, to suspend the right of constables and firemen to retire on pension during that period, to provide that war injuries shall be deemed to be non-accidental injuries for the purpose of enactments and other instruments relating to the pensions of constables and firemen, to amend section sixteen of the Fire Brigade Pensions Act, 1925, and for purposes connected with the matters aforesaid.
- Citation: 2 & 3 Geo. 6. c. 103
- Territorial extent: England and Wales; Scotland; Northern Ireland (section 15); (Note: Section 16(3).)

Dates
- Royal assent: 5 September 1939
- Commencement: (Note: Section 16(2).)
- Repealed: 21 July 2008
Other legislation
Amended by	Police and Firemen (War Service) Act 1944; Police Pensions Act 1948; Statute Law Revision Act 1950; Police Act 1964; Police (Scotland) Act 1967; Northern Ireland Constitution Act 1973; Statute Law (Repeals) Act 1975
Repealed by	Statute Law (Repeals) Act 2008

Status: Repealed

Text of statute as originally enacted

Revised text of statute as amended

The Police and Firemen (War Service) Act 1939 (2 & 3 Geo. 6. c. 103) was an act of the Parliament of the United Kingdom passed soon after the outbreak of the Second World War. It was mainly concerned with pensions for those leaving the UK's fire services and police forces to serve in the armed forces (section 1–5), including those in the army and navy reserves (section 6) but excluding those in the London Fire Brigade (section 7).

It also clarified such matters regarding probationers and those in training on leave (sections 8 and 13) and that those injured on war service would have that injury counted as non-accidental injuries (section 11), but that nobody leaving the force to join the armed services needed to re-attest (section 9). It also made different provisions for chief officers (section 10).

== Subsequent developments ==
The whole act was repealed by section 1(1) of, and part 6 of schedule 1 to, the Statute Law (Repeals) Act 2008, which came into force on 21 July 2008.
