= Police (Scotland) Act 1956 =

Act of the Parliament of the United Kingdom

Police (Scotland) Act 1956 (Note: Section 41(1).)
- Act of Parliament
- Parliament of the United Kingdom
- Long title: An Act to consolidate with amendments certain enactments relating to police forces in Scotland and to the execution of warrants in the border counties of England and Scotland.
- Citation: 4 & 5 Eliz. 2. c. 26
- Territorial extent: Scotland (Note: Section 41(2).)

Dates
- Royal assent: 15 March 1956
- Commencement: 1 January 1957 (Note: Section 41(3). The Police (Scotland) Act, 1956 (Commencement) Order 1956.)
- Repealed: 27 October 1967
Other legislation
Amends	See § Repealed enactments
Repeals/revokes	See § Repealed enactments
Amended by	Police Act 1964; Police (Scotland) Act 1966
Repealed by	Police (Scotland) Act 1967

Status: Repealed

Text of statute as originally enacted

The Police (Scotland) Act 1956 (4 & 5 Eliz. 2. c. 26) was an act of the Parliament of the United Kingdom.

== Provisions ==
=== Repealed enactments ===
Section 38(1) of the act repealed 20 enactments, listed in the third schedule to the act.

Citation	Short title	Extent of repeal
1 & 2 Geo. 4. c. 88	Rescue Act 1821	The whole act.
11 Geo. 4 & 1 Will. 4. c. 37	Criminal Law (Scotland) Act 1830	Section fifteen.
20 & 21 Vict. c. 72	Police (Scotland) Act 1857	The whole act.
21 & 22 Vict. c. 65	Police (Scotland) Act 1858	The whole act.
32 & 33 Vict. c. 33	Judicial Statistics (Scotland) Act 1869	Section five.
34 & 35 Vict. c. 112	Prevention of Crimes Act 1871	Section twelve.
48 & 49 Vict. c. 75	Prevention of Crimes Amendment Act 1885	The whole act.
52 & 53 Vict. c. 50	Local Government (Scotland) Act 1889	Sections thirteen and ninety-seven.
53 & 54 Vict. c. 67	Police (Scotland) Act 1890	The whole act.
55 & 56 Vict. c. 55	Burgh Police (Scotland) Act 1892	Sections seventy-eight to eighty, eighty-two to ninety-eight, four hundred and sixty-nine, four hundred and ninety-four and five hundred and two.
4 & 5 Geo. 5. c. 8	Police (Weekly Rest-Day) (Scotland) Act 1914	The whole act.
4 & 5 Geo. 5. c. 53	Special Constables (Scotland) Act 1914	The whole act.
4 & 5 Geo. 5. c. 61	Special Constables Act 1914	The whole act.
9 & 10 Geo. 5. c. 46	Police Act 1919	Sections three, four and ten.
13 & 14 Geo. 5. c. 11	Special Constables Act 1923	Sections one, two and four. In section five the words from "and sections ninety-six" to the end of the section.
19 & 20 Geo. 5. c. 25	Local Government (Scotland) Act 1929	In section three, subsections (3) to (6). In section five, subsection (6).
8 & 9 Geo. 6. c. 11	Police (His Majesty's Inspectors of Constabulary) Act 1945	The whole act.
9 & 10 Geo. 6. c. 26	Emergency Laws (Transitional Provisions) Act 1946	The Second Schedule so far as it amends section four of the Special Constables Act 1923.
9 & 10 Geo. 6. c. 46	Police Act 1946	In subsection (2) of section twenty, the words "Except so far as it amends section eleven of the Police (Scotland) Act 1857"; in the Second Schedule, paragraph 5.
9 & 10 Geo. 6. c. 71	Police (Scotland) Act 1946	The whole act.

== Subsequent developments ==
Section 18(2) of the act was amended by section 1 of the Police (Scotland) Act 1966 (4 & 5 Eliz. 2. c. 26), which came into force on 21 December 1966.

The whole act, except section 37, was repealed by section 52(1) of, and part I of schedule 5 to, the Police (Scotland) Act 1967, which came into force on 27 October 1967.

Section 37 of the act was repealed by section 52(1) of, and part II of schedule 5 to the Police (Scotland) Act 1967, which came into force on 27 October 1967.

== Bibliography ==
- John Burke and Clifford Walsh (eds). "Police (Scotland) Act, 1956". Current Law Statutes Annotated 1956. Sweet & Maxwell. Stevens & Sons. London. W Green & Son. Edinburgh. 1956. Chapter 26. Google
- The Laws of Scotland: Stair Memorial Encyclopaedia. The Law Society of Scotland. Edinburgh. 1995. Volume 16. Paragraphs 1708 at pages 240 and 242.
- David M Walker. A Legal History of Scotland. LexisNexis UK. 2004. Volume 7 (The Twentieth Century). Page 337.
- J Bennett Miller. An Outline of Administrative and Local Government Law in Scotland. W Green & Son. 1961. Pages 263 to 265. Google
- "Summary Jurisdiction: Some Acts of 1956 - I" (1957) 101 The Solicitors' Journal 310 (13 April 1957)
- (1956) 75 Law Notes 120 (No 5)
- Halsbury's Laws of England. (The Laws of England). Third Edition. Butterworth & Co (Publishers) Ltd. London. 1959. Volume 30. Pages iv, 128 and 129.
- The Encyclopaedia Britannica. 1962. Volume 20. Page 165.
- J Daniel Devlin. Police Procedure, Administration and Organisation. Butterworths. 1966. Pages 35, 59, 110 and 129. Google
- Ian Oliver. Police, Government and Accountability. Macmillan Press. 1987. Pages 14, 29, 246 and 247.
- Police: A Social Study. Church Information Office. 1967. Page 79. Google
- Cowell, Jones and Young (eds). Policing the Riots. Junction Books. 1982. Page 67. Google
- Robin Evelegh. Peace Keeping in a Democratic Society. McGill-Queen's University Press. 1978. Page 14.
