= Gerard Van Helden =

Dutch police detective (c.1848–1901)

- Born: c. 1848; Gouda, Netherlands
- Died: 12 June 1901; Birmingham, England
- Occupation: Detective Superintendent in the Birmingham City Police

Gerard Jacob Van Helden (c. 1848 – 12 June 1901) was a police detective who became Detective Superintendent in the Birmingham City Police Force in Birmingham, England.

== Overview ==
Gerard Van Helden was born in the Netherlands in about 1848. Working for his father he journeyed firstly to London and then to Paris. In 1867, he was caught in the Siege of Paris when the Prussians stopped all the French trains running. When the siege ended in 1871 he journeyed back to London and then to Birmingham. There he joined the Birmingham City Police as a Constable fourth Class. Within a year he received very rapid promotions and in 1872 was an Honorary Sergeant. By 1881 he was an Inspector having solved many important cases and in 1885 he was promoted to Chief Inspector of the Detectives Department, in Birmingham. His success was based on an ability to remember faces and be fluent in Dutch, German and English. At one time, he acted as bodyguard to the Right Honorable Joseph Chamberlain, (1836–1914), the Birmingham politician and one time Colonial Secretary and William Gladstone (1809–1898), the British Liberal Politician. Eventually he was promoted to Superintendent of the Birmingham City Police Detectives Department where his crime solving continued until his untimely death. He had an unusually eventful career and experiences and became known as "The Famous Detective". He was known countrywide.

== Early life ==
Gerard Jacob Van Helden was born in about 1848 in the small town of Gouda, the Netherlands. His father was a Hide and Skin Merchant. Gerard Jacob Van Helden was educated at a boarding school in Turnhout, Belgium, where he learnt English, French and German languages. After he left school he went to work for his father and was sent to Bermondsey Market, London, to do some trading. He was engaged by a company to go to Paris, which came under siege by the Prussian Army just after his arrival. For about two months, he was engaged in helping the French outside the fortifications constructing barricades, etc. and then was involved in preparing food for the population, at which he was, reputedly, very efficient. At the end of May 1871, the Prussians entered Paris and Gerard Van Helden left making his way back to London. Three days later he arrived in London and two weeks later he arrived in Birmingham and joined the city Police force.

== The Birmingham Police Force ==
Birmingham was England's second largest city. Gerard Van Helden joined the City of Birmingham Police Force as a Constable 4th Class on 19 April 1871 and was given the Warrant number 4595. In June 1871 he was promoted to Constable 3rd Class, December 1871 to Constable 2nd Class and June 1872 Constable 1st Class. sometime during the previous year he became attached to the Detectives Department of the Force and in October 1872 was made an Honorary Sergeant. The Birmingham Watch Committee were so impressed by his work results they awarded him a special gratuity for his vigilant conduct. His ability in languages in multicultural Birmingham and an ability to remember faces had brought him to the attention of his superiors and his promotions continued. In March 1874 he was promoted from 2nd Class Sergeant to 2nd Class Sergeant, mainly for arresting four burglars. In January 1881 he was promoted to 3rd Class Inspector, April 1882 to Second Class Inspector, mainly in recognition of his services as an interpreter, in July 1884 to First Class Inspector and May 1885 Chief Inspector of the Detectives Department. In 1894 he became Chief Superintendent of that department. This rate of promotion on ability is unique.

In August 1873, a young Constable joined the Birmingham City Police named Frank Richardson, and was assigned to the Bradford Street Police Station, central Birmingham. Both lived in the centre of Birmingham with their new wives. There were four divisional offices in the centre of Birmingham at this time. Van Helden's office was in the main Town Hall complex and later Steelhouse Lane. As Van Helden became more involved in criminal detection he needed a Policeman as a uniformed presence and it appears he often chose Frank Richardson who was climbing the promotion ladder as he was. They worked together for ten years until Frank Richardson was promoted to Chief Constable and Fire Brigade Chief of Hereford in 1882. where he was to remain until 1920. The link between them did not end here as Frank Richardson's second son, Alfred Richardson joined the City of Birmingham Police in 1890 and was soon working in, by now, Chief Superintendent Van Helden's office. Gerard Van Helden's experiences in office were well reported in the local newspaper The Birmingham Post as were Alfred Richardson's. Frank Richardson's experiences in Hereford were well reported in the Hereford Times. Alfred Richardson climbed the promotion ladder very quickly in the late 1800s and achieved the post of the Chief Constable of Newcastle-under-Lyme, Staffordshire and later the larger police force of Halifax, West Yorkshire.

Gerard Van Helden solved 17 major cases over the years. His first important case was a Criminal Investigation by the Jockey Club of England which was entered for a race at the town of nearby Wolverhampton. A horse that was not the favourite, won a race easily. After the race there was a rain shower and some white markings on the horse washed off. Gerard Van Helden was sent to investigate the matter and he discovered the horse's appearance had indeed been changed. The owners were arrested and charged. In 1885 he issued a special notice via The Birmingham Post newspaper to Constables and Peace Officers of the Borough of Birmingham regarding a jeweller who had thirty one gold finger rings with intent to defraud. Instructions given: "You are commended to bring him before a Justice of the Police." In another case which caught the public attention he regularly secreted himself in a small cupboard on the premises of a Birmingham jeweller who had often been burgled. It took Van Helden seven weeks of hiding until a man with a revolver entered the premises, which saw Van Helden leaping from his hiding place and handcuffing the burglar. Another very high-profile case involved the manager of a large bank who slipped out of England in 1883 and went to France with Gerard Van Helden a few hours behind him. The man then boarded a boat intending to flee to South America but Van Helden was able to apply for his extradition back to England using some rather unorthodox methods. He was always interested in protecting the Jewellery District of Birmingham, which included ending the transporting of hall-marks and lengthy and complicated trials took place between 1891 and 1893 when alleged forgeries and forged Hallmarks were made by Van Helden to a Jeweller in business in Preston, Lancashire, at the Preston Borough Police court. The accused were charged with selling chains using the Birmingham Hallmark when they were not from Birmingham.

On another occasion he followed an Assay forger to Philadelphia USA. and tracking the offender to several locations eventually apprehending him in Chicago, Illinois, where the District Judge ordered the offender back to England to stand trial. Even when he became his departments Chief Detective Superintendent in 1892 his zeal for catching criminals personally did not diminish. Gerard Van Helden acted as a Protection Officer to the Rt. Hon Joseph Chamberlain the Birmingham MP,

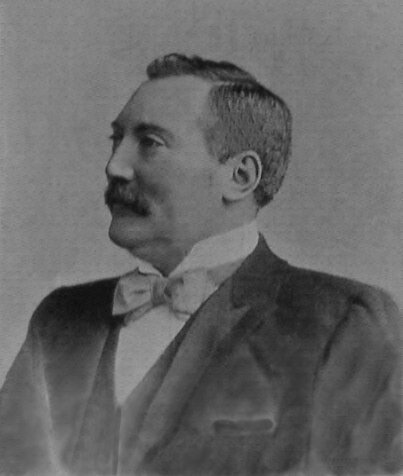
Detective Superintendent Gerard Van Helden of the Birmingham City Police Force, taken about 1895.

when he was Colonial Secretary, and he went with him on his eastern tour, which included Constantinople, Athens, and most of the islands in the Greek Archipelago. Mr. Chamberlain specifically asked for Gerard Van Helden and the invitation was accepted for the ten weeks it lasted. He also went to South Africa with Mr. Chamberlain in the late 1890s. In 1898 Superintendent Van Helden continued was based in the Detectives Office, Corporation St. Birmingham. In the late 1890s Gerard Van Helden turned his attention towards a prominent bogus company promoter who was later charged with negotiating many worthless cheques. As a testament to his memory for recognising faces a prisoner concerned in another case was in court for an offence and was recognised by Gerard Van Helden who was in court on another case who he had arrested twenty years previously. In 1898 he was offered retirement with a pension but elected to keep working.

In the spring and summer of 1901, Gerard Van Helden undertook a gruelling journey to Ireland and the north and west of England on behalf of The Force. On the journey home to Birmingham he was taken ill on the train and a doctor sent for on his arrival home. He was immediately ordered to bed but his condition deteriorated and he died a few days later.

== Family life ==
Gerard Van Helden who had been born in the Netherlands and educated at boarding school in Belgium, started working for his father when he first came to England. After his return from Paris he joined the City of Birmingham Police Force in 1871 and rose through the ranks until his sudden death in 1901. He started out as a clerk to the police in 1871, and was attested on 19 April of that year into The Force. He and his new wife were living in Irvine Street Court House, Birmingham. He had by then married Elizabeth, (1850–1933) from Bristol. With his extremely rapid promotion he moved houses as his status demanded and in 1891 was recorded in the census as living as a 'naturalised' Police Chief Inspector living in Spring Rd, Aston, Birmingham. with his wife and a Mary Ann Adams (1865–1941) as a Domestic Servant. Van Helden married Mary Ann in 1896 at Kings Norton, a suburb of Birmingham. Between then and 1901 they moved to a Police Residence in Moor Street Birmingham, near the Mor Street railway station and very near to where Frank Richardson lived twenty years previously. This location was central for the police Divisional Offices, the main police office and Law courts.

Obituaries

When he died in 1901 many newspapers reported his death with an obituary, perhaps the most significant was by The Police Review of 21 June 1901 and copied to The Owl newspaper, Birmingham; 'Obituary: Chief Superintendent Van Helden. The lamentably sudden death of Superintendent Van Helden deprives the city of an officer whose zeal in the discharge of his duties was as noteworthy as his skill in his business was exceptional...There was a little of the Sherlock Holmes system about Van Helden's methods...' Similar obituary articles and notices were posted by The Portsmouth Evening News Thurs 13 June 1901, Yorkshire Telegraph and Star 4 July 1901, Sheffield Evening Telegraph 14 June 1901 and 4 July 1901, The Gloucester Echo, 14 June 1901. The Cheltenham Chronicle 15 June 1901. Previously in December 1900 Van Helden and his wife had a son, Anthony Gerard Van Helden, but he died on 1 April 1901. Anthony is included in that census. In consequence of the sudden death of Detective Superintendent Van Helden, the Birmingham police sports, which was to have been held on 13 June, was postponed on an order from the Chief Constable. Another newspaper insert noted: 'It is stated that Van Helden had caught pneumonia. Out of respect for the deceased's long and useful official career, military honours will be accorded.' The Funeral: The distance from Gerard Van Helden's residence in the centre of Birmingham to Lodge Hill Cemetery was six miles. Starting at 2pm it was long and impressive according to The Police Review newspaper had an article which read: "The funeral of the late Detective Supt. Van Helden who died on the 12th inst. took place on the 15th inst. at Lodge Hill Cemetery, Selly Oak. There was a long procession from the deceased's residence, in which several Chief Constables from neighbouring cities and districts attended, and a large body of police. There were one hundred and twenty five policemen and twenty five firemen in the procession. Members of the Detective Department wore sombre black, and there were contingents from the Birmingham Fire Brigade and from the Aston and Kings Heath Police.

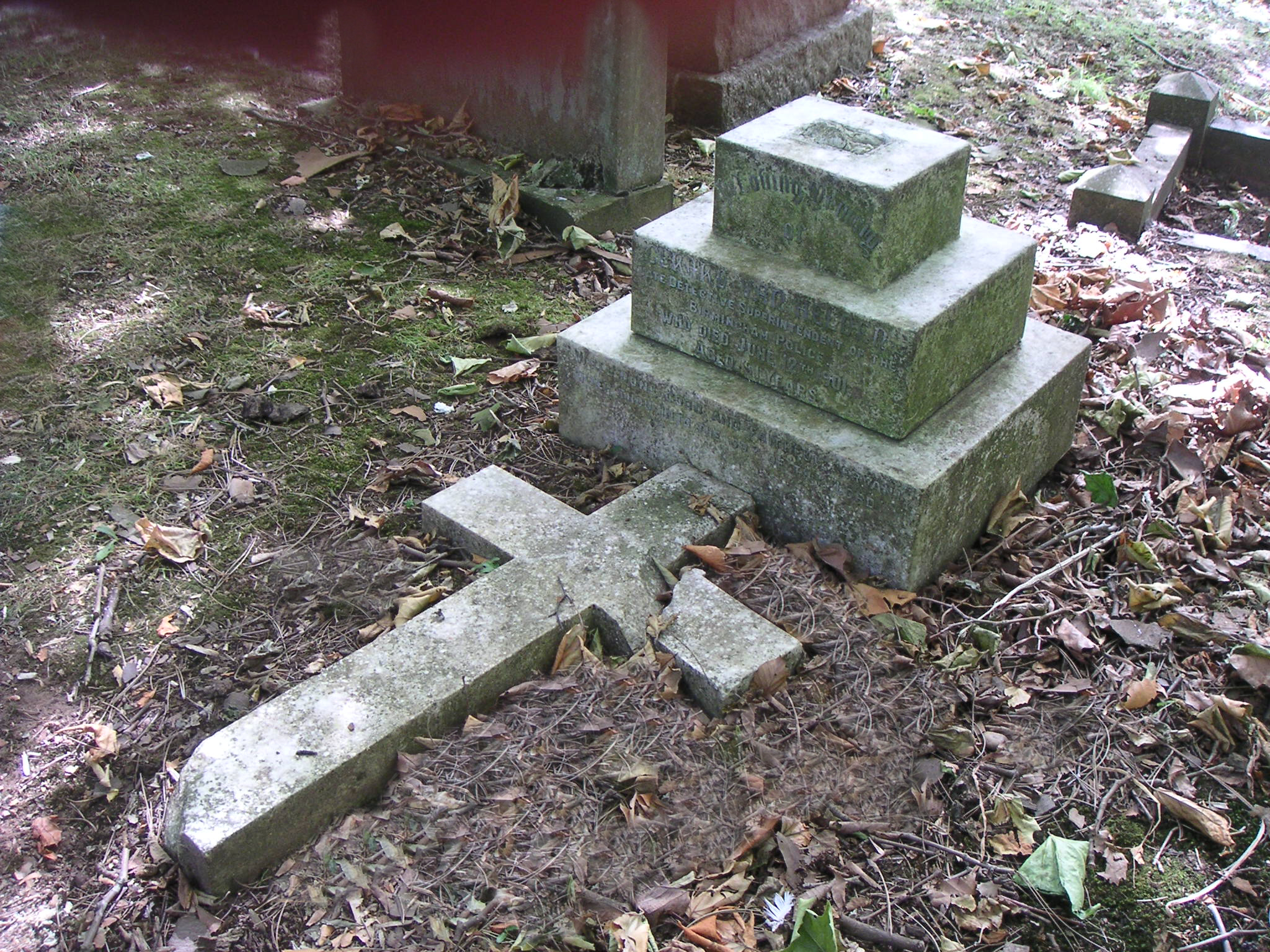
Memorial (broken) of Gerard Van Helden, who died 12 June 1901, Detective Superintendent in the Birmingham City Police Force.

The hearse was covered with floral tributes. Among those who took part in the procession was the Chief Constable of Birmingham (Mr C.H. Rafter), Chief Constable Richardson Hereford, Bennel (Kidderminster) and Charsley (Coventry), all of whom were formerly in the Birmingham force … A number of Councillors were present. The following members of the Detective Department acted as bearers; Insprs. Daniel, Taylor, Davies, Richardson … There were many handsome floral tributes including one from the Right Hon, Joseph Chamberlain with the wording 'In kind remembrance, from J. Chamberlain' … among the mourners was Mrs. Van Helden and Mr. Rymeer Van Helden." Gerard Van Helden was buried at Lodge Hill Cemetery, Selly Oak, Birmingham alongside his son. In reporting the funeral it was noted by the press that his wife would receive a police pension. Mary Ann Van Helden lived until 1941 having moved to Newcastle upon Tyne, Northumberland. Elizabeth Van Helden died in 1933 in Birmingham.

== See also ==
- Frank Richardson
- Ernest Frank Richardson
- Alfred Herbert Richardson
