= Women in policing in the United Kingdom =

Women began working as police officers in the United Kingdom as early as December 1915 amidst the First World War. As with other countries, police forces in the UK were entirely male at the start of the 20th century. Their numbers were limited for many decades, but have gradually increased since the 1970s. In England and Wales, 31.2% (40,319) of police officers were female on 31 March 2020. Previously, policewomen made up 28.6% in March 2016, and 23.3% in 2007. Women also make up a majority of the non-sworn police staff. Notable women in British police forces include Cressida Dick, the former commissioner (chief) of the Metropolitan Police Service.

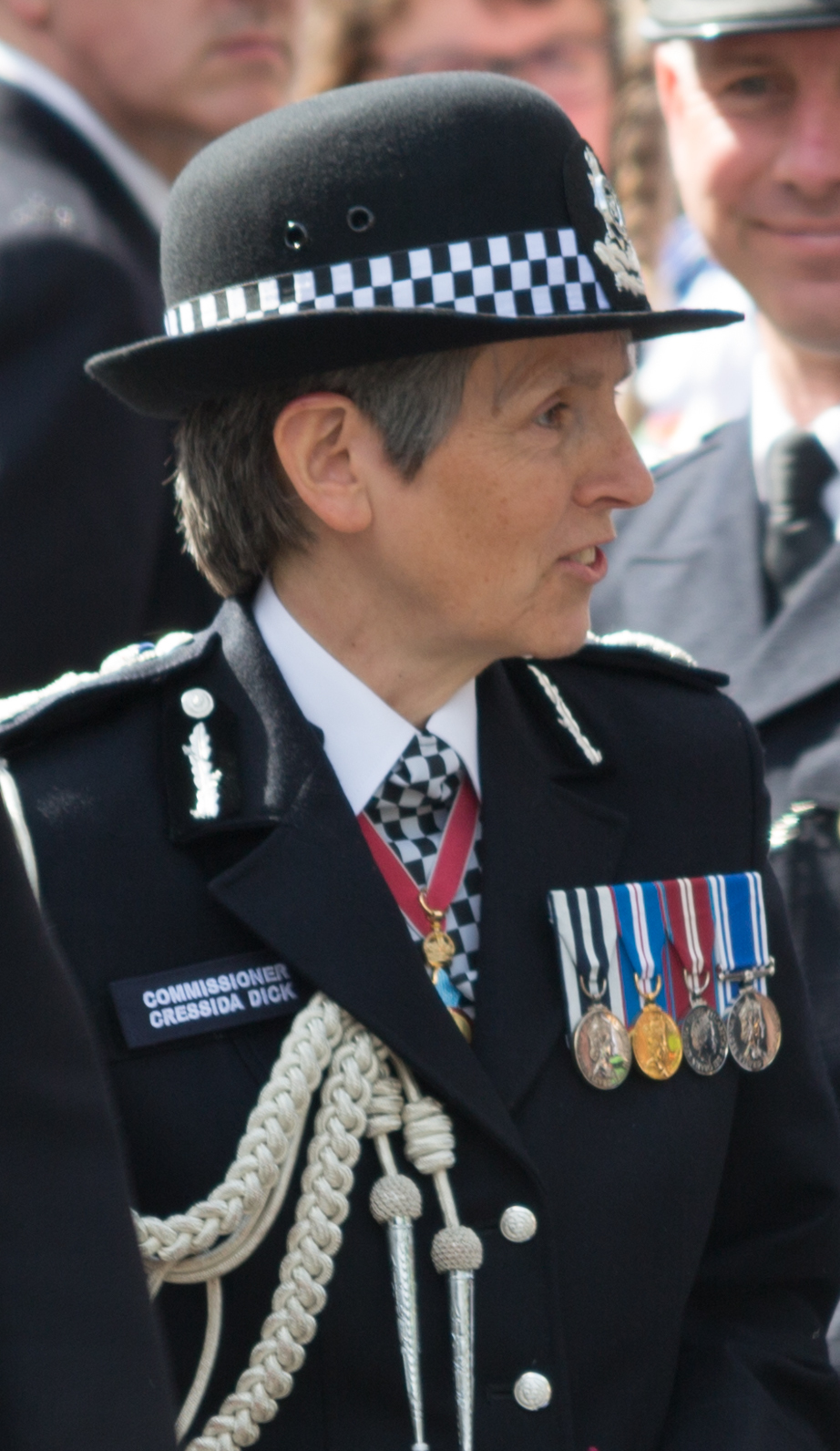
Cressida Dick, former Commissioner of the Metropolitan Police Service in London.

Until 1999, women in the police had their rank title prefixed with the word "Woman", or the letter W in abbreviations (e.g. "WPC" for Constable); this construction is still sometimes used in the press and by individuals. From 1919 until January 1993, female officers' warrant numbers also came from a different series from male officers'.

== History ==
=== Precursors ===
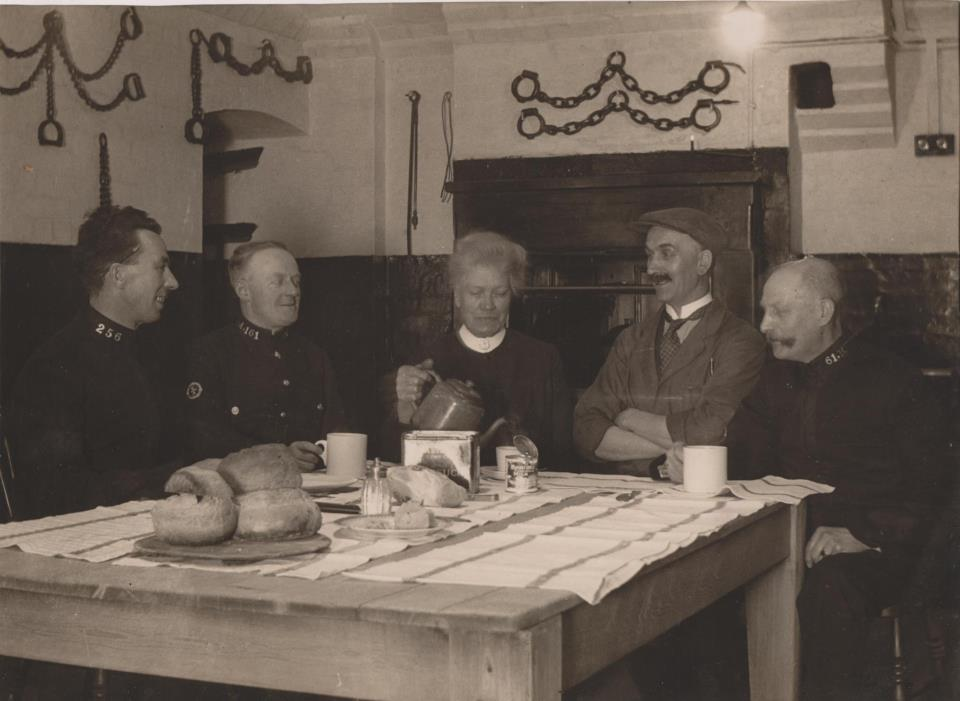
Police in Birmingham with a matron in about 1919

The first women to be employed by the police were matrons. In 1883, the Metropolitan Police recruited its first woman in the role, and within six years had 14. They were tasked with guarding women and children, and were usually wives or relatives of the officers. Apart from London's Metropolitan Police commissioning of a report by a "female on females in custody" in 1907, the police forces did not give any consideration to women being employed as officers until the First World War.

In 1910, five women got together as a group and started to draw the attention of the police authorities to the fact that there were no woman constables, even though many women were temporary prisoners in police custody. Two women in particular sought to point out the lack of a woman constable presence was wrong. They each had a relative in political high office. One of these women was Edith Tancred (1873–1957). She became a campaigner for the requirement of women police. The other was Dorothy Peto. Peto later decided to take the 'administrative path' within the Constabulary for promotion. Both Tancred and Peto were well placed in society to get their views heard. They were soon joined by three other women campaigners, and around 1911 started unofficial street patrols from an office in Bristol "to maintain public morality and decency". A Voluntary Women's Force was created in Bath, Somerset in 1912. In 1914 Peto joined the National Union of Women Workers and made patrols herself. Florence Mildred White left her teaching post at the Godolphin School in 1914 to live and work in the newly created Bath office for women police, where Peto had become the Assistant Patrols Organizer). White stayed at the Bath office until May 1918, working under the supervision of Peto, as a Patrol Officer in the city.

The war deprived the country of able-bodied young men and was a major impetus for the arrival of the first female officers, as well as many comparable developments in other professions. At first, women began organising voluntary police police patrols. These included:

- Women's Police Volunteers, later known as the Women's Police Service – established by Margaret Damer Dawson and Nina Boyle in 1914. They had joined forces after seeing the trouble faced by refugees during the war. These volunteer women were allowed to officially patrol the streets of London and policemen were asked to assist them. They were trained and they were intended to assist women during the turmoil of the war. It later provided women officers to police the government munitions factories.
- Voluntary Women's Patrols, run by Boyle after a split from Damer Dawson's organisation in 1915 – these had spread to some major British cities by the end of the First World War and were made up of 'well-bred' women patrolling the streets to help women and children and especially those who became involved in crime.

=== Entry into the profession ===
In August 1915, Edith Smith became the first British woman to be appointed a police officer with full powers of arrest. Her duties were to deal with cases where women were involved. She was particularly concerned with trying to reduce the number of prostitutes in Grantham who were attracted there by the nearby army base. Female officers were also recruited in Hull and Southampton later that year. Salisbury, Liverpool and Glasgow had twenty women constables already attested by 1919.

Sir Leonard Dunning, His Majesty's Inspector of Constabulary, wrote an article in Police Review in 1918. About two of the six pages of his annual report concerned the employment of women in professional police work, including the possibility of them having the powers of arrest. Many chief constables saw the role of women as 'Clerks and Chauffeurs' and thought women could possibly be employed as special constables. The chief constable of Wolverhampton wrote an article in Police Review and Parade Ground Gossip in which he listed a range of duties women could undertake within the Force. On 16 November 1921, the Metropolitan Commissioner of Police, Sir Nevil Macready, who was considered to be setting the standard throughout England, issued an order that with the possibility of women being appointed to the Police Service, these would reflect current requirements for male officers; "a minimum height would be established, though at 5 feet 4 inches this was considerably lower than that for men." Florence Mildred White (see below) was officially documented as being 5 feet 5.5 inches (1.66 m) tall. Macready added that women with dependent young children would be barred from service, women officers were not to be sworn in as constables, and they would not have the right to a pension.

Once police forces had recruited a small number of women, they tended to organise them into separate units. They were typically given jobs that specifically involved arresting or caring for women and children. In 1919, the Metropolitan Police recruited 110 women to be unattested policewomen (i.e. not having powers of arrest) to serve in the Women Police Patrols, led by Superintendent Sofia Stanley. However, in 1922, their numbers were cut to just 24, after a committee of Parliament recommended disbanding them entirely. Similar cuts to women numbers happened in other forces. Ostensibly a result of budget cuts, these happened at a time when the wartime women's rights movements were petering out and in some cases being undone. In 1923, the Women Police Patrols became attested officers and their numbers were increased to 50.

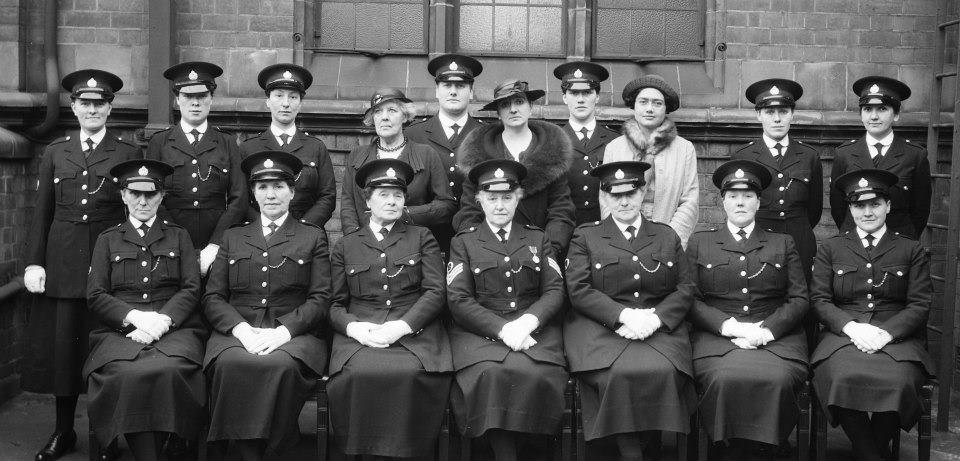
Policewomen in the Birmingham City Police during the inter-war years.

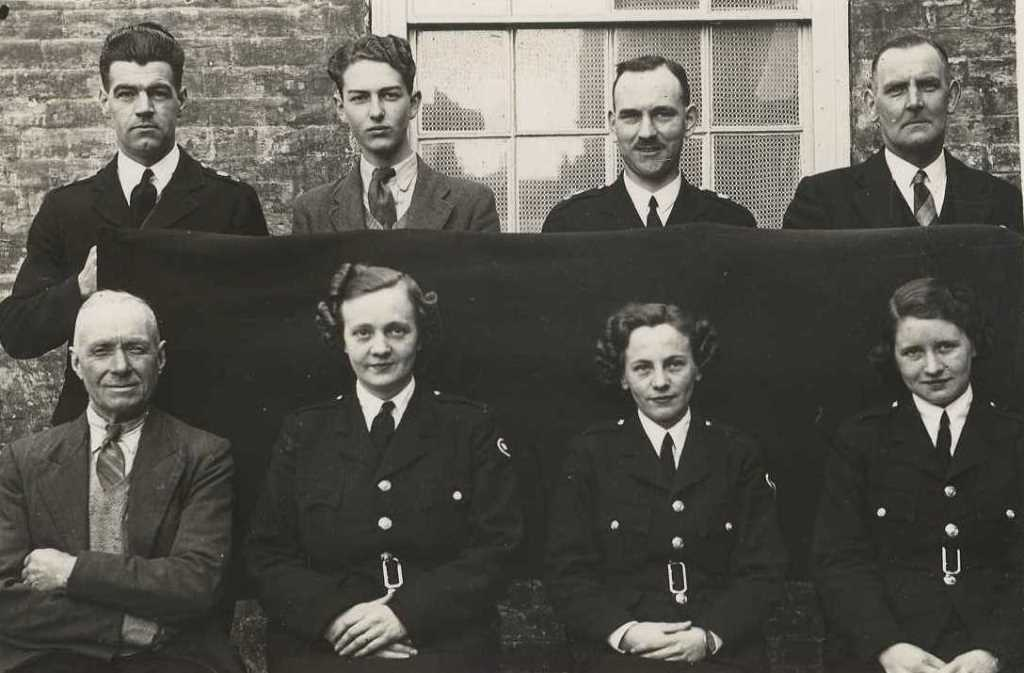
Women police in Hull City in 1940

The Home Office set up the Baird Committee in 1920 on the employment conditions and attesting of women in the service. Two Inspectors of Constabulary gave evidence as did several senior people in the service, including two attested sergeants from provincial forces, Florence Mildred White and Ethel Gale from Gloucestershire.

Although there was little change or recruitment of female officers in the 1920s, more rules and guidelines were published to give them a clearer position. Further guidelines were published by the Home Office in 1931. Dorothy Peto moved to the Metropolitan Police in 1930 and became the first attested superintendent two years later. In her 14-year tenure in charge of its A4 (Women Police) division, their numbers were increased from under 60 to over 200, and it employed half the policewomen in the United Kingdom. In 1948, women were for the first time permitted to join the Police Federation.

=== Integration ===
Until the 1970s, police forces segregated its female officers from the men, where they had separate ranks, duties and sometimes facilities as well. The situation changed in the 1970s, which saw the passages of the Equal Pay Act 1970 and Sex Discrimination Act 1975. Around this time, segregation was ended. The Metropolitan Police abolished the A4 division and integrated its female officers in 1973.

== Today ==
In March 2017, the percentage of female officers was 29.1% in England and Wales, 29% in Scotland and 28.5% in Northern Ireland. In England and Wales, women made up a 61% majority of non-uniformed support staff (likewise in Northern Ireland) and 45% of Police Community Support Officers. The proportion of female special constables is similar to that of fulltime police officers.

Women make up a higher percentage of constables than of higher-ranked officers. The Home Office attributes this to the fact that women make up a higher proportion of the newer officers, who are less likely to serve in the higher ranks. The percentage of women among new recruits was static overall between 2007 and 2017.

The British Association for Women in Policing, founded in 1987, represents female officers and their interests.

== Timeline of firsts ==
Rank	First attested officer	Force	Year
Constable	Edith Smith	Grantham Borough Police	1915
Full time, paid Constable	WPC, later Sergeant Margaret Hood	Great Eastern Railway Police; British Transport Police	1917
Sergeant	Florence Mildred White; Ethel Gale	Salisbury City Police; Gloucestershire Constabulary	1920
Inspector	Florence Mildred White	Birmingham City Police	1930
Chief Inspector	Lilian Wyles	Metropolitan Police Service	1932
Superintendent	Dorothy Peto	Metropolitan Police Service	1932
Chief Superintendent	Elizabeth Bather	Metropolitan Police Service	1949
Commander; Chief officer (of any rank)	Shirley Becke	Metropolitan Police Service	1969
Assistant Chief Constable	Alison Halford	Merseyside Police	1983
Deputy Chief Constable	Sue Davies	Dorset Police	1994
Chief Constable	Pauline Clare	Lancashire Constabulary	1995
Deputy Commissioner of Police of the Metropolis	Lynne Owens	Metropolitan Police Service	2022
Commissioner of Police of the Metropolis	Cressida Dick	Metropolitan Police Service	2017

Others:

• In 1968, Sislin Fay Allen was appointed as the first non-white policewoman and joined the Metropolitan Police Service.
