= Alfred Herbert Richardson =

English policeman (1874–1951)

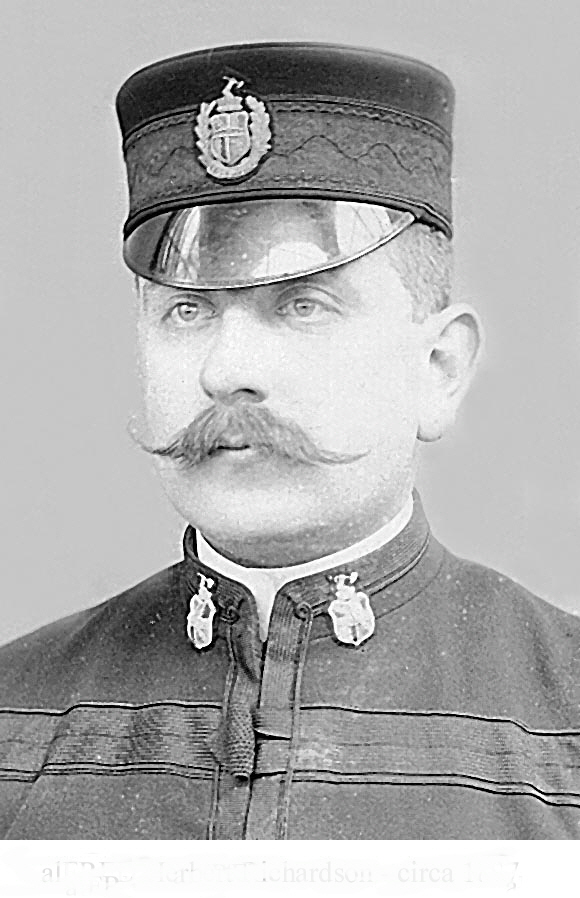
- As a Sergeant
- Born: 1 February 1874; Digbeth, Birmingham, England
- Died: 29 July 1951 (aged 77); Hipperholme, West Yorkshire, England
- Spouse: Emily Ethel Marden

Alfred Herbert Richardson (1874–1951) was an English policeman. He joined the Birmingham City Police in 1890. He achieved very rapid promotion within this force and in 1901 became chief constable of Newcastle-under-Lyme, Staffordshire. In 1903 he successfully applied for the chief constable's office at Halifax, West Riding of Yorkshire, where he remained until his retirement in 1944. During his time there he achieved many early improvements in policing at Halifax, some of which were later used nationwide. The most notable were the installing of coloured lights as traffic signals at road junctions, the formalisation of procedures for police identity parades, making 'keep left' mandatory for traffic and the installation of police telephones in the town, among others. In later years he was recognized as being a policeman who was ahead of his time. He came from a police family: his father, Frank Richardson (1851–1938), was the Chief Constable of Hereford from 1882 until 1920, and his elder brother, Ernest Frank Richardson (1871–1952), served as Chief Constable of Salisbury between 1903 and 1929. Thus three members of the Richardson family served as chief constables between 1902 and 1920. He also had three other brothers who served in other police forces.

== Early life ==
Alfred Herbert Richardson was the second son of Frank and Mary Richardson. He was born in a police house in Digbeth, Birmingham, where his father was serving in the city police force. He, along with his elder brother Ernest Frank, remained there until 1882. His father was then appointed Chief Constable of Hereford. This was a post he retained for 38 years until his retirement. When the family lived in Security Villa, next to the police station, Hereford, Alfred Richardson attended the Broomy Hill Academy, Breinton Road, Hereford. In around 1887, having finished his education, Alfred Richardson returned to Birmingham and took a post as a clerk in the City Police Force, Central Office.

== Constable to detective inspector, Birmingham ==
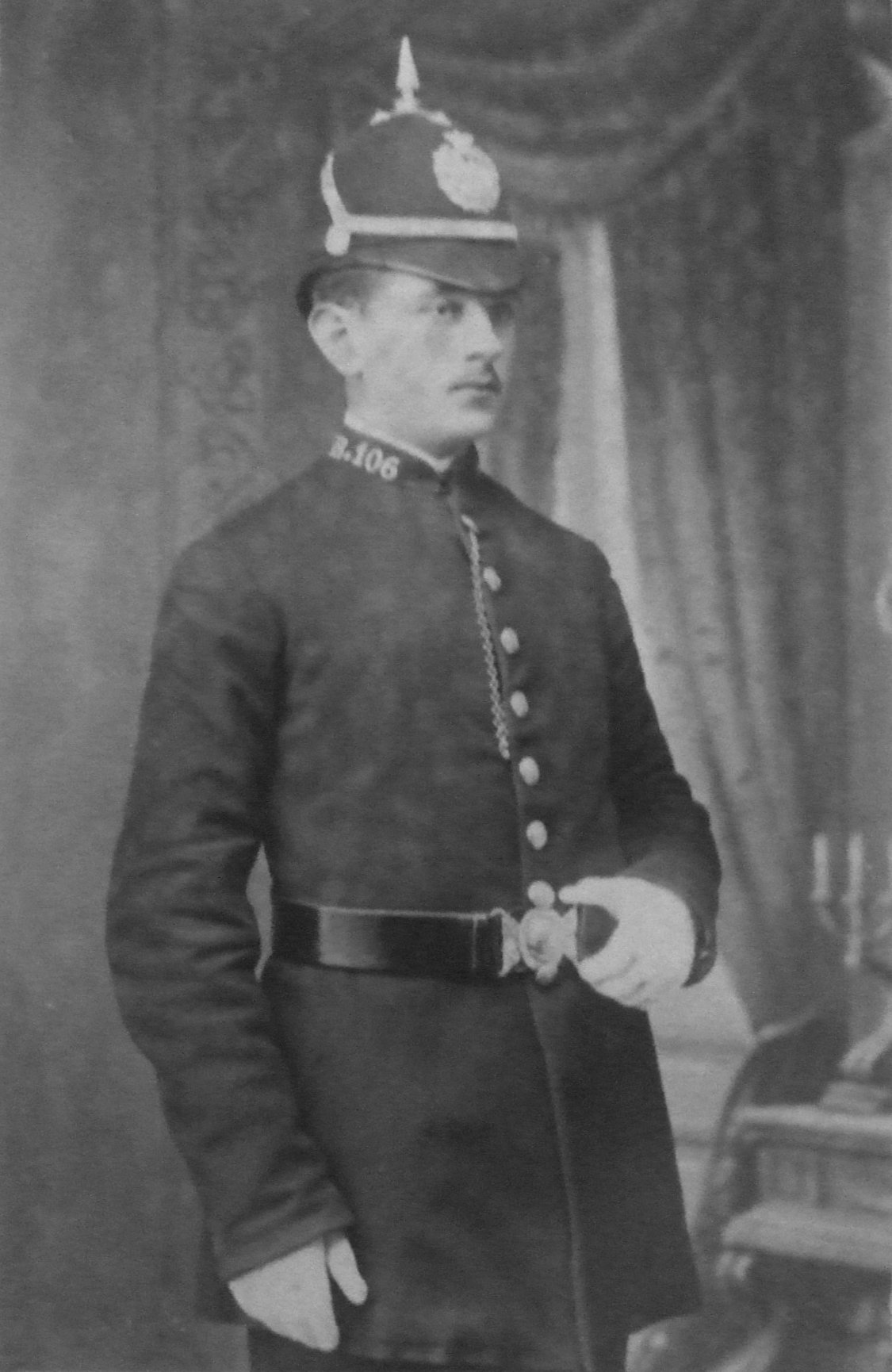
Alfred Richardson as a Constable

Alfred Richardson joined the City of Birmingham Police Force on 27 October 1890 and was attested. (Note: This entails the individual making a "Solemn Declaration to Serve Our Sovereign," in this instance Queen Victoria. Alfred's declaration was: I, Alfred Herbert Richardson of Birmingham, do solemnly and sincerely declare and affirm that I will well and truly serve the Queen in the office of constable, with fairness, integrity, diligence and impartiality, upholding fundamental human rights and according equal respect to all people; and that I will, to the best of my power, cause the peace to be kept and preserved and prevent all offences against people and property; and that while I continue to hold the said office I will to the best of my skill and knowledge discharge all the duties thereof faithfully according to the law.) Initially he was a 'beat constable' but was promoted through the four classes of constableship very rapidly and then moved from the beat to the Detective Office in central Birmingham. Here he came under the supervision of Superintendent (later Chief Superintendent) Gerard Van Helden, a very well-known detective of the time. On 26 April 1898 he was promoted to detective sergeant and on 26 March 1900 to inspector. Alfred Richardson remained in the Birmingham Central Detectives Office in the Municipal Buildings and the Moor Street Police Station and almost immediately he was promoted to detective inspector by the Birmingham Watch Committee of Police Promotion and Awards. Alfred Richardson was living with his new wife and her parents at this time. Alfred Richardson's mentor, Chief Superintendent Garrard Van Helden, died very suddenly in office in June 1901. Such was his standing in the Force that four chief constables, one of whom was Alfred's father Frank Richardson, and four deputy chief constables attended his funeral of 15 June 1901, with Alfred acting as a pall-bearer. (Note: A crowd and many policemen lined the five-mile route from Van Heldens residence in Moor Street to Lodge Hill Cemetery. The grave was in good condition when viewed in 2012.) In May 1901 he successfully applied for the post of chief constable of Newcastle-under-Lyme, Staffordshire, beating 69 other applicants. The conditions of the appointment and schedule of duties were "that the person to be appointed must not exceed 36 years of age. He will be requested to enter on his duties on the 2nd September, or as soon after as may be arranged and will be required to devote the whole of his time and attention to the duties of the office. The salary is £180 per annum with uniform, accouterments and boots. The duties will include all duties ordinarily appertaining to the office of the Chief Constable, the granting and endorsing of peddlers' licenses and the issuing of licenses, the duties of billet master, the duties of an Inspector of common lodging houses, the duties of an Inspector under the Contagious Diseases (Animals) Act and any other duties which the Watch Committee or the Town Council may desire him to perform consistently with his office."

== Chief constable, Newcastle-under-Lyme, Staffordshire ==
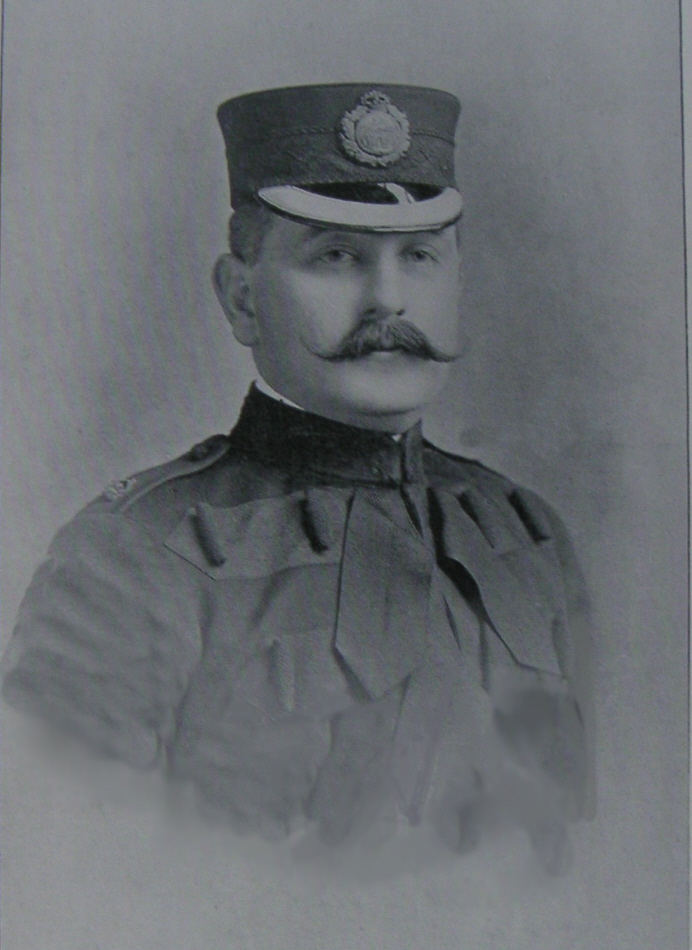
Chief Constable of Newcastle-under-Lyme

Alfred Richardson duly started his duties at Newcastle-under-Lyme Police Station on 2 September 1901. The Force size for the town was 18 men. His new telephone number was '9'. Within a few days there was a ceremony at the Town Hall and Square for the mayor and the town dignitaries and local citizens to meet their new chief constable, which he attended in his Number One uniform. This showed the chief constable's badge of rank, worn on the epaulettes, which consisted of crossed tipstaves in a wreath, surmounted by a crown, similar to the insignia of a Lieutenant General in the British Army. The population of the town was about 20,000 people and it was heavily industrialized. The conditions for his men were, "All Officers had to wear helmets for all duties and keep Truncheons. Constables would work twelve hours a day, seven days a week. There would be two shifts, one day and one night." There were no meal breaks. A beat system was such that a constable was taken to the start of his beat on foot by a superior. Constables worked on 'shifts', which meant they spent about six or seven hours during the day or night at their work. Some weeks they did 'nights', others they did 'evenings', others did 'days'. At this period they worked seven days a week with no rest days, which was to become a factor in Richardson's next appointment. As he had in Birmingham previously, the new chief constable now appeared by name regularly in the local newspaper in court cases. In these cases Alfred Richardson was the prosecutor, a role he was to continue in his next post. At this time, and later, the Borough had an ongoing problem with smallpox, which added to police work with contagion. Newcastle-under-Lyme Fire Service worked, as all fire services did, in conjunction with the local police force, but it was an entirely separate unit. There was a fire brigade captain and lieutenant, 12 men and two runners in Richardson's time. In 1901 it had a first-class steam engine, one manual engine and a new fire escape. It was separated from the police force in the early 1880s.

Alfred Richardson had married Emily Ethel Marden in Birmingham at St Silas' Church, Lozells, on 13 August 1898. Ethel was a daughter of Inspector Thomas Marden (1847–1913) of the Birmingham City Police, and the first of their two children was born in March 1902 in Newcastle-under-Lyme, the second in 1905. In February 1903 he found that the Council Watch Committee of Halifax, West Riding of Yorkshire, was advertising for a new chief constable. Halifax was regarded as a 'tough town'. There were 31 applicants including five army officers, three chief constables and a number of police inspectors among them. Richardson was in the final interview. The police sub-committee selected six for the final interview and held a ballot as to who would be offered the position. Richardson received a substantial majority. His salary was to be £250 per annum with an annual increase of £25 until £350 was reached. £50 per annum was paid in lieu of house coal, light, water, taxes and clothing. Two and a half per cent of salary was paid into the police pension fund. He tendered his resignation to the Newcastle-under-Lyme Watch Committee in March 1903. The local newspaper, the Halifax Guardian, carried the news in an article: "Young Chief of Police. Mr A. H. Richardson was appointed Chief Constable of Halifax yesterday. He is one of the youngest Chief Constables in the country being at present but thirty one years of age." (In fact he was 29 years old, as he had joined the force under age.)

== Chief constable, Halifax, West Yorkshire ==
Under a Charter of Incorporation 1848, A watch committee was formed and the first members of the Halifax Borough Police were appointed on 7 July of that year. In April 1903 Richardson took up his post as Chief Constable of Halifax, West Riding of Yorkshire, in the then relatively new building housing the Magistrates' Court, (Note: After 1924 the building also housed the Quarter Sessions Court.) the Coroner's Court and police station. The Force size at this time was 118 men. This was the start of the time when the Halifax Police Force became known as one of the smartest in the country, reflected in the strict discipline Richardson instigated. He, with his wife and young son, moved to a large detached stone-built house in Clover Hill Road, Halifax (known as Clover Lea in 1903, but soon there were concerns by the Halifax Watch Committee about his general safety. There was a surge of threats to officials at this time, including the British Royal Family, and he had to move in closer to the town centre and live nearer the Police station at Harrison Road. The Halifax Borough Council had several houses available and he moved to Balmoral Place, Halifax.

Balmoral Place was about two hundred metres from the police station in Harrison Road. The police office was quite large. At ground floor level there was the main reception behind double entrance doors. Further in were various rooms used for storage. At this level were the cells for the prisoners just arrested and for those prisoners attending the magistrates' court in the building. There was no basement in the building and this was why the court was on the first floor. Access from the cells to the court was up a short flight of stairs which had a double doored cage around them and a door at the stairs' base. This was for security and allowed the magistrates or judge to 'send the prisoner down'. There were twelve cells in total and these were for short duration use only. The prisoners travelled to and from Leeds prison. There was a large courtyard between the court building and the police station which was used for police parades. The parade ground was also used for exercising the horses and housed four stables. From reception, going up the steps to the first floor the first item encountered was the police enquiry desk. Behind the desk were three corridors. One corridor to the left housed the typists' room, a small room for the senior typist and a store room. There was also a sergeants anteroom and the sergeants main room. There was another corridor to the right which housed the chief typist, an inspector, a chief inspector and a superintendent. At the far end was the chief constable's office which had a constable seated at its entrance day and night. The Criminal Investigation Department was in another corridor. There was one more set of stairs at the rear of the police station. Letters from local residents in the Press i.e. "The Halifax Courier", wrote that a measure of much needed discipline continue in the Halifax Force. Richardson was considered to be the man to bring this about and he had acquired the reputation of being a strict disciplinarian which continued throughout his career. He presented his first financial accounts to the Halifax Watch Committee on 28 September 1903 where the cost of the Constabulary per week averaged £164.1s.7d. The police were paid weekly at this time. Within weeks Richardson persuaded the Watch Committee to purchase a Black Maria, a horse and a secure trailer fitted with lockable cubicles for transporting prisoners to and from the court in Halifax to Leeds prison. He insisted the design was adjusted so that it could rapidly become an ambulance should the need arise. In 1905 he attended a meeting in Bradford of the Chief Constables Association. An official photograph by the CCA shows him, his father and his brother among 40 attendees. A similar meeting of chief constables in the association took place in Brighton, Sussex, in 1906, which he attended. In August 1905 after a recommendation from the chief constables report of the time, the Halifax force was increased by six additional constables.

On 3 December 1906 Alfred Richardson, was given permission to join the general and finance committee of the Northern Police Orphanage and Convalescent Home in Halifax. Chief Constables were encouraged to add their patronage. He wrote a booklet for his men which was an extract from a council meeting held on 7 May 1906. It was written so that all members of the Force could know the regulations to which it was their duty to confirm. In 1907 there were several disturbances in Commercial Road, Halifax, during the tram drivers strike, causing much extra work for the police. The local press praised the constabulary for their restraints in handling this situation. By this time Richardson had increased further the reputation of the force as one with a strict sense of discipline and generally having a smart turn out, a sentiment reflected in the local newspapers. Richardson was known to have a love of horses, even to wearing spurs in his office at Harrison Road. Halifax was soon to have its own horses and stables, rather than hire them. Horses were increasingly seen as effective in crowd control. In the annual inspection by His Majesty's Inspector of Constabulary Sir Llewelyn Atcherley in 1930, the Borough Mounted Police in full dress uniform were presented by Richardson to the Inspector.

In 1907, Alfred Richardson received an open testimonial from the mayor of Halifax. It was: "Testimony of His Worship, the Mayor of Halifax, Alderman R. D. Ward. JP as to four years of Alfred Richardson as Chief Constable of Halifax." 1907 had seen the Women's Suffrage Movement make its presence known in Halifax, mainly by a local resident named Lavena Saltonstall (1881–1957). (Note: Lavina Saltonstall. Daughter of Mary and John Saltonstall. Born 3 September 1881 near Hebden Bridge, Yorkshire. Joined Suffragette Movement circa 1902. Left Hebden Bridge to live in Halifax March 1906. An Electrical Engineer's clerk and married George Baker, a Private in the Duke of Wellingtons Regiment, at the Unitarian Chapel, Halifax, in June 1917. There were no children and she died a Widow in St. Lukes Hospital, Bradford in September 1957.) Saltonstall was born near Hebden Bridge, Yorkshire, and moved to live permanently in Haugh Road Halifax in 1906. Saltonstall met the suffragette Christabel Pankhurst who had toured the area, especially around 1905/6. She made speeches in Halifax during the tram strike and agitating for reform for women by writing letters. This then evolved into a local suffragette movement in Halifax, which Alfred Richardson had to monitor with care and tact. In 1908, Saltonstall wrote an article in the local newspaper, The Halifax Guardian, entitled "Our Police System" a by-product of which was to give an insight into the Halifax Police and Chief Constable Richardson. Part of the article stated: "In order to gather a little information, concerning the work of the Police Force, the other day I paid a visit to the Halifax Borough court. First of all I will mention the fact that a friend of mine had business with the Chief Constable, which fact gave us the chance of getting to his office. Presently we came to an inquiry office where we had to await the Chief's pleasure. Photographs of police groups adorned. Presently we received the intimation that the Chief was disengaged, and we walked into another room sumptuously furnished. The Chief himself had taken refuge behind a table on which were books and pens and inks and flowers. Several movable objects in the form of chairs and rulers and books, and also a fire-screen, were placed near him. An ecclesiastical looking individual in belt and buttons, and with a signet ring and a scholarly stoop, he mounted guard over the door by which we had entered. As in the outer office, photographs etc. and the Chief's overcoat, tall hat, and walking-stick adorned the walls." Comments were made in the local press about how well the local constabulary handled the Suffragette Movement in the town from this time (1908) until its demise in 1916. It seems that the chief constable met with a certain amount of approval by Saltonstall.

The Halifax Borough Committee and Watch Committee had complete control over the Force at this time. There was a great deal of discontent in the Halifax Force and Richardson thought his men were getting a raw deal from the Borough Watch Committee but got short shrift from them when he tried to improve their working life. Apparently he got very tenacious about their working hours and would not back down after repeated attempts to get them a better deal got dragged out over a period of time. In the end, however, he won the day. His men were very grateful for his efforts and a brass plaque was cast in 1910 and erected in the entrance hall of Harrison Road Police Station from 1910 until 1985. When the Station moved to a new location it was re-erected at the new station at Richmond Close, Halifax. Both Alfred Richardson and his brother Ernest Frank Richardson were involved in improving the indexing of police procedures on identifying past law-breakers by fingerprints and body measurements. Alfred Richardson tended to favour the Bertillon (1853–1914) method which involved several body measurements being recorded. His brother, Frank Richardson preferred indexing the records after photographing on-site fingerprints. (He had been working in conjunction with the Home Office, London, for many years on experimenting to find the best method.) Alfred Richardson gave lectures locally on the differences between the Bertillon method and photographic fingerprinting.

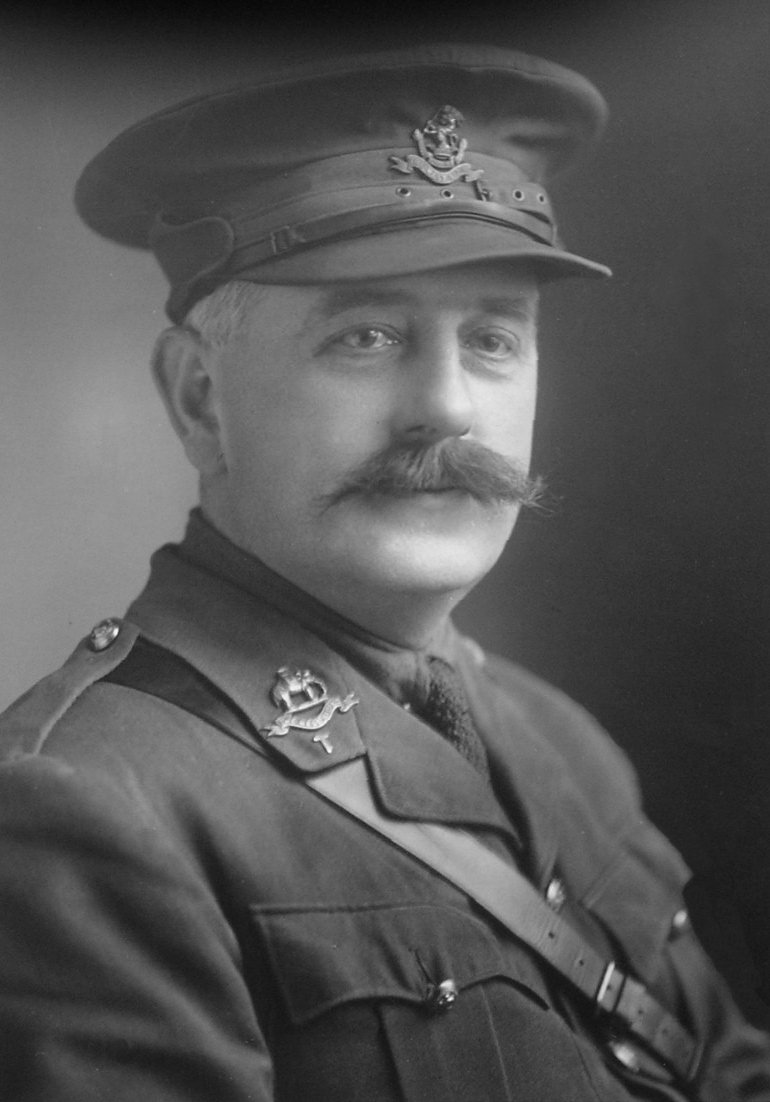
Military, 1915.

Around about 1910 the Borough Police acquired four police horses. They were purchased and used for crowd control with the horses being stabled in the yard at the Harrison Road Police Station, having their names over their stable doors. Four horses were photographed in the Mounted Police Section in 1930 as part of the annual inspection of the Halifax Borough Police of that year by Sir Llewelyn Atcherley, His Majesty's Inspector of Police, with Chief Constable Richardson. The Suffragettes were holding meetings that often ended with crowd trouble and there were many strikes at local works and on the railways in the offing at Halifax. A year later a car was purchased for Halifax police use and bicycle use had reached a peak by this time. Also, a motorbike and sidecar unit was formed and based at Harrison Road. 1911 saw the first national census when the householder presented the census form as opposed to giving verbal details to an enumerator. On 18 May 1912 there was a special meeting of the Watch Committee and it was resolved 'That the Police Standing Orders be reprinted as amended and re-published to the Force.' This was an update of the booklet published on 7 May 1906 and reflected the improved conditions of the Police Force and reaffirmed that the Force could know the regulations to which it was their duty to conform. (Note: Booklet was again the size which enabled it to be carried in a uniform breast pocket. It was signed by Alfred Seed, Councillor and Chairman of the Watch Committee, and A. H. Richardson, Chief Constable.) On 11 July 1912 King George V and Queen Mary visited Clough Mill, a factory site near Halifax. This entailed a heavy police presence and a large amount of police activity to ensure their security. Alfred Richardson was later to become recognised for a particular police security procedure he created for this event which had the security and police activity highly organised. Always involved with Police Pensions, Alfred Richardson added to the Family Archives a newspaper article from Sheffield where a Quarter Sessions Judge gave police officers consideration where the house, free gas and coal were supplied when calculating that officer's pension. At the outbreak of the First World War he joined up as a Territorial, in the Duke of Wellington's Regiment which had a long-standing association with Halifax. He was the assistant provost marshal and given the rank of major. Alfred Richardson was in charge of the Harrow Dog Kennels near Halifax, which provided dogs for the war effort. During the early days of World War I, Chief Constable Alfred Herbert Richardson was in charge of the kennels. They provided dogs for use in the trenches, for scouting with soldiers and for use in sentry duty at isolated posts. In 1914, he served with the 4th Battalion Duke of Wellington's Regiment and as a major was the Halifax recruiting officer with the regiment.

He stayed in Halifax for the duration (and was re-activated on the outbreak of the Second World War.) He was head of recruiting of Halifax men into the army and was based at Catterick Garrison between 1914 and 1918. An article was written in the Halifax Courier on 3 October 1914 when he was involved with the Harrow Dog Kennels, Halifax. Two dogs had been officially recruited at Halifax and given a constables number in the 1880s, so there was a long tradition of using them for whatever purpose long before other constabularies did. This tradition might well be the reason Harrow Kennels were considered important, and Richardson was known as being an advocate of the use of dogs to be properly trained in the detection of crime. Later in the local newspaper there were several articles about two Halifax Policemen who had joined up and were now in the trenches. A letter was written to the chief constable by them whilst serving with the British Expeditionary Force. They had written to Richardson thanking him for their Christmas gift. It was reported in a local newspaper on 20 December 1915 that "several, but not many, temporary Constables were appointed to the Halifax Police stationed at Harrison Rd."

During the First World War Richardson, in his position as chief constable, issued instructions about introducing, the Keep Left Rule, Traffic Signals and the Police Identity Parade. All motor and horse drawn traffic must drive on the Left hand side of the road. This was mandatory and not optional. Coloured lights at busy road junctions were introduced into Halifax, being one of the first Boroughs to do so. There were two lights for each road, one red for Danger (red as it was considered to be the best colour to penetrate fog and haze) and green for Go. These two colours were used by the railways and instantly recognizable by the population. They were attached to tram poles and hand operated by a constable. This is thought to be possibly one of the first uses of traffic lights in the country. London had used semaphore signals, the first sited at Charing Cross, but they were never considered to be effective.

Richardson introduced the Police Telephone System throughout the borough during the First World War. They were attached to tram line poles, and for the first time constables on the beat could contact Harrison Rd. H.Q. Telephone boxes were introduced in 1925 and pillar type telephone boxes (soon to go nationwide) which could be used by the public in emergencies. These were used in Halifax until 1967. An article headed Police Signals. records that" Lt. Col. Sir Hugh Turnbill, Commissioner of the London City Police, is making full use of electrical devices in connection with his force. He is experimenting with a signaling system in connection with the present ambulance alarm posts. The Journal remarks: Halifax was one of the first towns to introduce this system. When will these who follow the doings of Halifax, as we have wondered before, give Halifax and its chief constable the credit that is due in them, and acknowledge Halifax as the very first town to adopt these street signals for the purpose of communicating from headquarters with men on the various beats. There are 24 such lights in operation in Halifax now and the system has been in use for over 20 years. It has been a great boon. For instance, before it was introduced, if headquarters wished to pass any kind of information on to the man on duty in the streets it could only be done by messenger, a waste of time and a very cumbrous method compared with that in existence today." However, it was not until 1937 that London saw telephones that were erected in Pillars in quantity. Soon, their use was extended to the public.

Alfred Richardson had turned his attention to the Police Identity Parade. These had been held for many years by police forces, but there was no standard procedure or rules (such as a minimum number in a line up) that was followed. Halifax was the first Police Force whereby all those taking part had to be of similar likeness and build as the person arrested. The number of individuals in any Parade had to be the same wherever the Parade took place. This was adopted throughout the country and is still used today. At this time Richardson became the secretary of the Chief Constables Association of England and Wales and in 1917 he became Vice President and 1918, President.

The Halifax Ambulance Team with Richardson in charge, records, circa. 1918, that the first and second teams of the Halifax Borough Police Ambulance Teams and the prizes, 'of which there are many', they had won during the summer months. A range of other trophies had been won by individuals. Later, in the yard of the Police Station at Harrison Road, policemen from the newly increased Mounted Section posed for a photograph. There were seven Constables wearing a white sash and gaiters, two Sergeants, two Inspectors and the Chief Constable. (Wearing gaiters and spurs.) Before the War there were only three or four mounted men. All the horses were stabled in the yard which was big enough for them and motor cars as well as Police parades. The mounted section lasted until 1944, when the number were reduced to four again, the last horses were named Pilot, Portia, Peter and Paul.

In 1918 it was officially announced that "Major A. H. Richardson, Chief Constable of Halifax, Yorkshire, has resumed duties after four years service with the army, having transferred to the Reserve of Officers." Also in 1918 his term of service in the police force was completed and he had reached pensionable age. However, the Halifax Borough Council Watch Committee asked him to stay on in office, and he did so, until 1944. Around this time Richardson instigated the installation of a Police Out-Station at Kings Cross, Halifax, which was a mini replica of Harrison Road. This, he said, would benefit the police and, just as important, the local population, and set the scene for what was to become Neighbourhood Policing in the UK many years later. The first Police van for the Halifax Borough Police was purchased in 1920. Richardson supervised the purchase and modifications were made so that it could be used for various other purposes, not least of which was for use by The Coroner's court in Halifax. By 1922 Halifax had many theatres and cinemas. Richardson made and published a booklet regarding the safety of people in 'Queues at Licensed Places of Entertainment' involving their health, weather protection and creating crush room amongst other headings. This followed a tragedy in London when some people died in a cinema fire because the emergency doors opened inwards. Richardson ensured all such doors opened outwards from now on. From 16 January 1924 the Borough was granted the status of a 'Quarter Session town'. This affected procedure and routines for Richardson and his police/court work. From this time he was very active in a prosecutors role in court cases. In 1925 he wrote a book called 'The Evolution of the Police Force.' and also wrote a booklet 'Superannuation in the Police Force'.

On Friday 15 October 1926 the Prince of Wales visited Halifax. It was another of several visits the Royal Family made to Halifax during Richardson's time in office. Richardson continued to establish his reputation of being a good organiser and planner. He prepared the borough police by devising a booklet of 28 pages. It shows, in detail, the route of the cars taking part, crowd control, sergeants in charge of sections, mounted police positions, roads to be blocked off and timings – to the minute. Everyone taking part had a copy of the booklet so every policeman on duty knew not only what they had to do but what other policemen had to do as well. It had the signature of A.H. Richardson on the cover to prove it was genuine, and all copies had to be returned immediately the visit was over. Copies were later sent to other chief constables as a template for any royal visit they might get.

In 1930 the government introduced the Road Traffic Act 1930. In 1931 Richardson started the Borough Motor Traffic Police unit, specially concentrating on motor vehicles. A document from the Metropolitan Police Force, London, was sent to Halifax which the Force implemented and was distributed to the policemen. The chief constable wrote in a memorandum dated 1 January 1931: "The Road Traffic Act of 1930 places a responsibility on the Police in the Borough which can only be discharged by the organisation of efficient motor patrols throughout the County." Richardson purchased two vans which, from 3 August 1931, were used to enforce the new regulations that had just been brought in. Their use was mainly connected with speed limits in built-up areas in the Borough. Richardson continued his involvement with the local population by encouraging swimming and life-saving lessons and giving awards at the Woodside Baths, Halifax. In 1935 he was awarded the King's Silver Jubilee Medal. The well known Person and Trade Directory Kellys always listed the Chief Constable of Halifax when new editions were printed. One edition reads, Kellys Directory of West Riding 1936 has entry: Richardson. A.H. 5 Balmoral Place.

On 20 October 1937 King George and Queen Elizabeth visited Halifax. This was a cause for much celebration throughout the town and surrounding areas and large crowds of well wishers arrived to see them. Richardson, was in charge of the Policing arrangements and he followed up his success of 1926 by producing another, this time larger, list of procedures. Many more surrounding Forces were involved, so great clarity and understanding was required by the men. In the booklet he produced instructions for everyone involved in the procession of the King and Queen through the town. Every item that could have affected the procession is contained in the next 28 pages. Street closures-Funeral processions-crowd control-possible crowd surges-erecting barriers and taking them down-Police Signal lights-street telephones boxes-Police deportment-do not salute- Rights of photographers, First Aid, and the Mounted Police had a special extra set of instructions. It is possible to read through the booklet and know exactly who was where doing what by time and location within minutes. Each book had a unique number which the involved policeman signed for, and at the back is a message to say each copy MUST be returned to the Chief Constable of Halifax at the end of the day. Reading the booklet headings it appears the Royals safety was being taken more seriously perhaps than before. A photograph was taken and published in the Halifax Guardian showing the King and Queen with Chief Constable Richardson, the mayor and other local dignitaries.

Around this time two more small police stations were opened in the Halifax suburbs. This extended his ideas on bringing the police to the community and to make the Force more efficient.

In November 1938 there was in an incident of mass hysteria in Halifax as many people in the town believed a serial killer was on the loose. He had been nicknamed, The Halifax Slasher. Richardson, in a written statement to the press on 3 December 1938 headed, "Halifax Slashing Attacks" answered a number of questions that had been asked by the press and public, and then called in Scotland Yard, London. Eventually Scotland Yard concluded there were no "Slasher" attacks after several locals came forward and admitted they had inflicted the wounds upon themselves.

== Preparations for the Second World War ==
With War expected Richardson was heavily involved in preparing Halifax for a possible bombing blitz. In 1912 all chief constables had been given authority by Government to start a special constables unit, which Richardson used to the full in Halifax during the First World War. In the early 1930s he had introduced new uniforms, instructions and ID cards etc. to upgrade their status. He now re-organised the Halifax Special Constables Force on the 'outlying residential unit' basis he had previously set up. There was opposition from the Watch Committee to activate this, but it went ahead were proved later to be a great success. A leaflet dated 11 January 1940 regarding Police and Special Constable equipment and uniforms which included a list of Wartime aids for Animal Owners, was issued from the Chief Constables Office and sent to the thirteen outlying Residential Units. His role, within the framework of the Watch Committee, are noted in a series of committee reports from 8 December 1937 to 22 June 1939. There was a National "Safety First Congress". The chairman and chief constable are appointed as delegates to Congress in London from Halifax. A report from the Halifax Watch Committee stated "The Chief Constable requested extra furniture and repairs for more staff at Harrison Rd. Police Station. Chief Constable is advised the Air Raid Precaution unit for Halifax will be based at Harrison Rd. Police Station. Chief Constable and Fire Brigade to liaise and are instructed all of Halifax's public buildings are to be fitted with window blinds." A letter from the Home Office to the Halifax Watch Committee that stated all Chief Police Officers have been instructed to "assume immediately the responsibility of a scheme of public warning signals (known as sirens by the population) in urban areas under their command. The Chief Constable was authorised to carry out painting or white washing of kerbstones and necessary discs for traffic signals. Chairman and Chief Constable are authorised by the Watch Committee to attend a Conference of Chief Constables at Cambridge. For Air Raid precautions a shelter is provided in the Police Headquarters Harrison Rd. and an office for police telephone extensions. Also Curtains for windows are necessary."

Richardson had advocated the use of the police on motorbikes (Note: Possible number; two) in the mid-1930s because of their speed and maneuverability. When the Second World War started he increased the number to at least six. The motor bikes had sidecars attached and were equipped with gas masks and tin helmets. In January 1940 Alfred Richardson issued a booklet for animal owners in Halifax. It listed what animal owners should do during the expected blitz. 11 civilians were killed and 10 injured when a bomb dropped on Hanson Lane, Halifax on 22 November 1940. Ten other local bombing incidents occurred between June 1940 and December 1944. There was a total of 588 casualties in Halifax in the Second World War.

The Chief Constables Report for 1943, showed that "a general increase in offences of one kind or another, compared with 1941, showed there was an increase of 211 indictable offences and 404 more offences than the average of the last nine years." Each year, from 1903 until 1943, the watch committee was rewarded with a certificate of efficiency from The Home Office (Note: Central Government Office for the Constabulary of England and Wales) for efficiency and discipline for the chief constable of its police force. Never once during his time of office did he fail to attain the certificate. There were no women police officers in Halifax during his time in office; he did not approve of them. This was in contrast to his brother Frank Richardson, chief constable of Salisbury, who attested the first female police officer in England. (Note: Florence Mildred White (1873–1957) was attested into the City of Salisbury Police Force in 1918. Book. The Memoirs of Miss Dorothy Olivia Georgina Peto OBE)

== Retirement ==
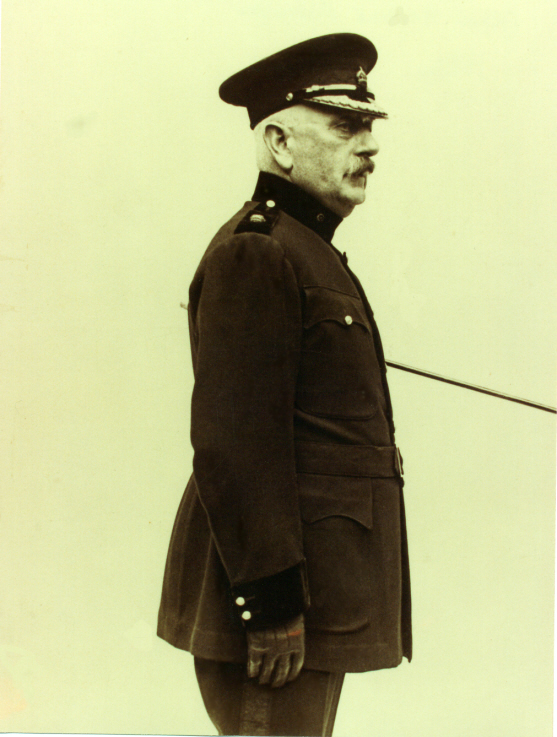
Chief Constable of Halifax taking his last parade in 1944.

Alfred Richardson was entitled to retire in 1918 when he had reached pensionable age within the police force. He was persuaded by the Halifax Borough Council Watch Committee at this time to remain in office. In 1938 he informed the council that he wished to retire, but again he was persuaded to stay in office, as war seemed inevitable. In 1943, when it became apparent that the Second World War was going to be over fairly soon, he officially gave notice to the council that he was going to retire, giving three months' notice dated from 13 September 1943. It was noted in the Halifax Police Force Officers and Constables Book, that Alfred Herbert Richardson, "Joined 8th June 1903. Superannuated 31 October 1943." The Watch Committee resolved that in recognition to the service he had given to the authority, (40 years) it granted he may relinquish the post on 31 October 1943. It immediately resolved that subject to Home Office approval the post would be advertised in the press by advertisement. Alfred Richardson took his last police parade in the courtyard of the police station in Harrison Rd. on 30 October 1943. He received much praise from the Halifax Special Constabulary and the town council in the various speeches made at this time, and in official meetings held before his day of departure. He had made no secret of the fact that he did not approve of women police (Note: Halifax Police relied on 'Matrons' when it came to dealing with females and children in their temporary care. A Police Matron in 1915 was a Mrs. Widgley. She testified in the Halifax Coroners Court concerning a female prisoner in April 1915. Halifax Guardian 3 April 1915.) and in fact none was appointed during his term of office. After his retirement it was nearly a full year before the first woman police officer was appointed at Halifax.

== Family life ==
Alfred Herbert Richardson was born on 1 February 1874 in Digbeth, a suburb close to the centre of Birmingham. He was aged eight years when his father became chief constable of Hereford, Herefordshire. From a home surrounded by industry, buildings and many other houses, he went to living in a detached house in its own grounds and a totally different environment and lifestyle. Both he and his elder brother Ernest Frank attended Broomy Hill Academy, Hereford, together for their education. He also had a close cousin, Ralph Clutterbuck, of similar age living nearby. Alfred Richardson was always known as Fred in the family, a name he decided to retain when he joined the Constabulary on 27 October 1890, (under the required age.) he did so as Fred Richardson. Whilst a constable in Birmingham he lodged with a then police sergeant, later inspector, Thomas Marden and family. Fred married one of Thomas's daughters, Ethel Emily Marden in 1898. (Note: St. Silas Church, Lozells, Birmingham, on 13 August 1898. They lived at Wills Street Birmingham.) Fred Richardson and his wife Ethel's first son, Frank Herbert, was born in Newcastle-under-Lyme, in 1902. After his appointment at Halifax, Fred Richardson was to take on the role of the 'senior' son in the Richardson family although he was the second born male. This was usually held by the first born in Victorian times. He had six brothers and three sisters. All his siblings were born between 1871 and 1894. In 1904 his second son Alfred Eric was born. In December 1905 Fred Richardson travelled to Southampton to wish two of his brothers, James Richardson and Ralph Richardson, farewell on their return to South Africa on the SS Kenilworth Castle. This was the last time he saw them. They were both killed in separate incidents in 1907, and Ralph, a Trooper in the South African Police Force was killed trying to save another man who was being attacked. Both were hailed as heroes. Also Fred Richardson's cousin, Ralph Clutterbuck, had died at the same time (Note: Ralph Clutterbuck died 12 May 1907 with James Richardson at his bedside.) of Diabetes in South Africa. All are buried next to each other in Braamfontein Cemetery, Johannesburg. On 2 November 1929 his son Alfred Eric married Florence Patricia Pearson. with Alfred Herbert Richardson signing the certificate. They had a daughter Jean Patricia (1930–2003) who became a medical doctor and emigrated with her new husband, Charles O'Morchoe, to the United States of America, where she became a professor and head of department of pathology, Harvard Medical School. Other medical appointments followed in later years.1) Seattle Canada newspaper, Bainbridge, 9 July 2003. Obituaries. Patricia Jean O'Morchoe. Their first son, Frank Herbert Richardson married Ethel Radcliffe in 1932. Circa 1950 Fred Richardson and Ethel had a photograph taken with eight members of Ethel's (Marden) family, the location is probably Halifax. This was to be their last photograph. Alfred Richardson died at the home of his son Eric in Hipperholme, Halifax, on 29 July 1951. He was survived by his two sons and his wife. His eight-page will was written by his own hand in October 1944. His funeral was held at the Holy Trinity Church on 3 July 1951, where the Halifax Borough Police lined the entrance to the church, and he was cremated at Lawnswood crematorium, Leeds, Yorkshire. His wife, Ethel Richardson, died in 1963 also at her son's home at Hipperholme, Halifax.

== See also ==
- Ernest Frank Richardson
- Frank Richardson (policeman)
- Gerard Van Helden
