= Florence Mildred White =

English policewoman (1873–1957)

- Born: 10 December 1873; Warminster, Wiltshire, England
- Died: 29 December 1957 (aged 84); Bournemouth, Hampshire, England
- Occupation: policewoman

Florence Mildred White (10 December 1873 – 29 December 1957) was an English policewoman. She became the first policewoman in Salisbury, Wiltshire in 1918, after training in Bristol and briefly serving in Bath. She joined Birmingham City Police in 1925.

Prior to joining the police force she was a teacher of English in Germany. She later returned to England and taught German, Italian and French at a school in Salisbury, Wiltshire, reaching a senior post. In 1914, aged 41, she moved to the Bath and Bristol city area to join a group of women who had started an unofficial Women's Police Volunteers unit. She returned to Salisbury in 1918 to join the Salisbury City Police. Seven years later she moved to the Birmingham City Police where she attained the rank of Inspector. She stayed with the Birmingham force until her retirement in 1937.

== Early life ==
Florence Mildred White was born on 10 December 1873 in the small town of Warminster, Wiltshire. She was the third child and second daughter of Charles Henry White (b. 1845, in Beckington, Somerset) and Marion White (b. 1844, in Preston, near Weymouth, Dorset). Florence Mildred was baptized in the Warminster Minister Church, St. Denys, on 8 March 1874. In 1881 the family lived in Warminster in a villa with a governess, a nurse and two housemaids. Her father was a cheese factor, or manufacturer of local and traditional cheeses. There were four children in the family noted in the census of 1881. After a local education her parents sent her to a private boarding School named Duncan House in Cleveden, Glasgow, and later to a finishing school, Clapham Park Ladies College, in south London. In 1892 she took a teaching post. From June 1898 until October 1903 she attended the Grand Ducal Victorian Pension at in Karlsruhe, Germany as a teacher of English, Italian and French. She described herself as a 'Modern Language Mistress in large Schools'. In 1906 she returned to England and became a teacher at the prestigious Godolphin School in Salisbury. She is recorded as being a 'Boarder', aged 37 years and single, in the 1911 national census of England. She was an Assistant Mistress (Modern Languages). This group consisted of a Head, six female teachers, a housemaid and a cook. Three other female teachers came from South Africa, Russia and Austria respectively. She later became a Senior Language Mistress at the Godolphin school, where she remained until 1914.

In 1914, White left the Godolphin School; her departure was so sudden that the other teaching staff wrote in the next edition of the school magazine that they were sorry not to have had the opportunity of saying 'Goodbye' to her. In a School Year Book the Headmistress of the school at the time, Miss Douglas wrote:

... Miss White! Far distant in quite another sense, for who can judge what must have been the change of climate when she passed from a school packed with youth and vigour where she always seemed to be one of the youngest, the happiest, and the most vigorous—to being a policewoman? She served first in Salisbury, and now she is the only policewoman in Birmingham— surely because of the undaunted courage and depth of human sympathy which we knew so well when she lived and worked amongst us.

== Patrol volunteer at Bristol and Bath ==
Apart from London's Metropolitan Police commissioning of a report by a "female on females in custody" in 1907, there was not any consideration given to women working within the Police Force.

In 1910 five women got together as a group to draw the attention of the police authorities to the fact that there were no women constables in the force, even though many women were arrested and were temporary prisoners in police custody. Matrons were employed as civilian staff to look after women and children only. They had been established for many years and were usually the wives of serving police officers. Two women in particular sought to point out this lack of a female constable presence was wrong. They each had a relative in political high office. One of these women was Edith Tancred (1873–1957). Tancred became a campaigner for the requirement of women police. The other was Dorothy Peto (1886–1974). In 1912 Tancred, Peto and three other women campaigners started organising unofficial street patrols from an office in Bath, Somerset and later Bristol "to maintain public morality and decency". The creation of the Bath office in 1912 was considered to be the first in England. It was disbanded in the latter half of World War One. In 1914 Peto, as Chief, had joined the National Union of Women Workers and made patrols herself. White abruptly left her teaching post at the Godolphin School in 1914 to live and work in the office of the group in Bath, where Peto had become the Assistant Patrols Organizer. White stayed working under the supervision of Peto as a patrol officer in the city until May 1918. She was at this time 44 years old and is mentioned in an article The Women Patrols – Miss I. Douglas, Miss White and Miss G. Bagnall and others spent many evenings, wet or fine, at this most difficult and exacting work. During the war Mildred White acted as a prisoner's friend at a court martial when she answered a call for 'women of a special type' to which she responded.

As the end of the First World War was approaching there were several other groups of women's police voluntary patrols in other major cities in Great Britain. These consisted of 'well-bred' women patrolling the city streets to help women and children who needed assistance or who became involved in crime.

Sir Leonard Dunning, (1861–1941) knighted on 14 February 1917, His Majesty's Inspector of Constabulary between 1912 and 1930, wrote an article in a police magazine in 1918. About two of the six pages of his annual report concerned the employment of women into professional police work, including the possibility of them having the powers of arrest. Many chief constables saw the role of women as clerks and chauffeurs and thought women could possibly be employed as special constables. The Chief Constable of Wolverhampton wrote an article in Police Review and Parade Ground Gossip in which he listed a range of duties women could undertake within the force.

== Salisbury City Police ==
With the possible end in sight of World War One there was much discussion within the male dominated British police force about the role women were going to play. His Majesty's Chief Inspector of Constabulary, Sir Leonard Dunning who seven years later would give Mildred White a reference for a post within the Birmingham City Police, concluded that such employment was a matter for individual police authorities.

Mildred White moved to Salisbury to join the Salisbury City Police as its first female member. She worked at the police station in Endless Street which was purpose built in the 1880s as the third police station within the city; it housed all the offices needed for the city force, a parade ground in its centre and it had several stables at the back. The chief constable had his accommodation there. Like all chief constables, Frank Richardson employed the wives or close relatives of serving officers to accommodate the needs of women and children who came into police custody. He decided a dedicated policewoman was best suited for this task in his force. Later, in June, at an important meeting in London, his decision was vindicated. Lady Nott-Bowes addressed the Chief Constables Association held at the Waldorf Hotel, London, on 23 May. She stated she hoped that those who tried the experiment of Women Police would do their best to get their full status recognised.

On 26 May 1918 White joined the Salisbury City Police and was attested immediately. Because she was attested she had the same rights as a male constable. Her appointment was confirmed by the Salisbury Watch Committee and also by her new employer, The Birmingham Watch Committee, when she took up the appointment there in 1925.

She joined as a constable and was promoted rapidly. Her commencing salary on joining the force was £210. per annum. On 3 April 1919 she was transferred to the same pay and allowances as that of ordinary (male) constables of the Force and she was promoted to 11th class constable with an increase in salary of £2 per week. On 22 May 1919 she was promoted from 11th class constable to 10th class constable to take effect from 25 May 1919 at an increase of £2.1s.0d per week. This was again revised when she was transferred from 10th class constable old scale to 12th class constable, new scale, back dated to 1 April 1919 with a salary increase of £3.12s 0d per week. By 1920 she was a sergeant. Her duties were plainclothes work in the mornings and city patrol work, in uniform, in the evenings. In February 1919 she attended a Salisbury City Court hearing as a prosecution witness at an alleged bigamy trial. Because she was attested she had the power of arrest; in contrast, Dorothy Peto remained an unattested Lady Enquiry Officer. Dorothy Peto maintained she would not accept a rank below inspector, whereas White did accept the lower rank. Most important of all to constable and then Sergeant White was that she now could receive a pension like her male counterparts. Chief Constable Richardson took steps to ensure she would get her pension by clearing her with the Salisbury Watch Committee on appointment as someone who was superannuated, writing a letter to her chief constable at her next posting in 1925 stating "Miss White is entitled to reckon the period between 26 May 1918 and 26 May 1925 as 'Approved Service' within the meaning of Section 8 (1) of the Police Pensions Act 1921."

The Home Office in London set up the Baird Committee in 1920 on selection, control on the future employment conditions and attesting of women in the Service. Two H.M. Inspectors of Constabulary gave evidence as did some thirteen others from various ranks and locations within the countrywide police force. Sergeant Mildred White from the Salisbury City force attended as did Sergeant Gale of the Gloucestershire force. It was specifically pointed out to the Committee that Sergeant White and Sergeant Gale were already attested female policewomen. Another who attended was Lillian Wyles who was to write a book later of her experiences.

On 16 November 1921 the Metropolitan Commissioner of Police, Sir Nevil Macready, who was considered to be setting the standard throughout England, issued an order that with the possibility of women being appointed in the Police Service they would be in line with requirements for male officers; "a minimum height would be established, though at 5 feet 4 inches this was considerably lower than that for men." (White was officially documented as being five feet five and one half inches tall so qualified in stature.) Macready added that women with dependent young children would be barred from service, women officers were not to be sworn in as constables, and they would not have the right to a pension. Salisbury, Gloucestershire, Liverpool and Glasgow had attested women Constables but it appears only White of Salisbury paid into a pension and had equality with male constables.

In 1925 Peto left the Birmingham City Police, and White applied to the City of Birmingham for Peto's post. The choice of force may have been coincidental with the Peto post becoming vacant, but the Richardson family had strong connections with Birmingham since Frank Richardson (Senior) (Chief Constable of Hereford from 1882 to 1920) started his police career in Birmingham in 1871. White very quickly made contact with Sir Leonard Dunning (17 June 1860–8 Feb 1941), still the Chief Inspector of the Constabulary, asking him if he would give her a reference for the post in Birmingham. Dunning duly wrote to the Chief Constable of Birmingham City Police, Sir Charles Rafter (1857– 23 August 1935), from his home in Horsham. White also wrote a letter to Chief Constable Rafter stating she would welcome getting experience from a larger force.

Two weeks later White sent her application for the post to Birmingham. This she did on Chief Constable Frank Richardson's office notepaper, adding she did so with his permission as well as his agreement that she should apply for the post. She also wrote another letter to Chief Constable C. H. Rafter in April 1925, reiterating the monetary conditions that she was expecting in her new position relating to her pay i.e. salary, detective allowance, plain clothes allowance, boot allowance, and she added five per cent of pensionable pay being deducted towards the Superannuation Fund. Chief Constable Rafter replied with a personal letter to White giving very precise details of what would be expected of her in her duties as a Lady Enquiry Officer in the Birmingham City Police Force. He added that his "Force needs a broad minded woman of the world" and noted that "If your Chief Constable approves of your joining this police force I would seek the approval of your Watch Committee about allowing you to count your previous police service in the Salisbury Force towards pension in this Force". White often referred to her possible new position as being a Lady Enquiry Officer, a female detective. She could not be attested, as there was no provision for it in the Birmingham Force at the time; it was to be 1930 before the rules were changed in Birmingham. Two women, Evelyn Miles (1867–1939) who would become a sergeant later and Rebecca Lipscombe were policewomen since 1918 but were not attested and therefore did not have the same powers or status as their male counterparts.

White journeyed from Salisbury to Birmingham on 23 April 1925 for an interview with the chief constable at the Chief Constable's Office in Corporation Street, Birmingham. White was accepted for the post of Lady Enquiry Officer with the Birmingham Police Force, Detectives Office. She had to accept the title "Lady Enquiry Officer", as opposed to "Policewoman". Her previous attestation was held in abeyance. Peto was very pleased with the outcome: she wrote in her Memoirs that on her resignation she had the consolation of promoting the appointment in her post of Sergeant White of Salisbury, who had trained at the Bristol School and was admirably qualified, in her view, to take over and develop the work in Birmingham. Peto notes the White, having already been sworn in at the Salisbury Force, was able to make her transfer and to carry her "attested work" with her. Commencing work in Birmingham Peto did not have the power of arrest. Peto also wrote that in 1925 there were about thirty female Constables in Great Britain. By 1937 she estimates this number was just under three hundred.

On 1 May 1925 Chief Constable Frank Richardson sent a Certificate of Approved Service to Chief Constable Rafter and confirmed "Miss Florence Mildred White is resigning from the Salisbury Force to take up an appointment with the Birmingham Force." He then sent another letter enclosing a 'Certificate of Service' for White. Chief Constable Frank Richardson wrote an open letter certifying White has his "written sanction to take up office" with the Birmingham City Police. The necessary permission of the Birmingham Watch Committee was obtained for White to be transferred into their Force. At the end of May Chief Constable Richardson wrote in a letter to Sir Charles Rafter that she had been a great benefit to his force, and he recommended her release to her and Birmingham's benefit.

At this time Sergeant White was summoned to appear at a meeting of the Salisbury Council Watch Committee. There, as the Salisbury and Winchester Journal reported:

The Salisbury Council says that this would be the last occasion they would have Miss White, the policewoman, with them. He (the Mayor) took the opportunity of saying how much the city appreciated the work she had done and he was sure she went away with their good wishes. Another councillor stated he wished to associate himself with the Mayors words and congratulated her on her new appointment at Birmingham. Miss White replied that the work had not been easy but would have been much more difficult if she had not had the support of colleagues and general public. She looked forward to returning to the familiar streets sometime.

Sergeant White was to be officially released from the Salisbury Force on 2 June 1925. However, she had written on 23 May to the Chief Constable of Birmingham, saying that she envisaged travelling from Salisbury to Birmingham on 3 June. When White left Salisbury the local press, The Salisbury and Winchester Journal noted her move adding:

Senior local residents of the time are recorded as remembering her walking the Salisbury beat in her wide brimmed hat and smart blue uniform.

At White's departure in May 1925, Chief Constable Frank Richardson immediately replaced her with another attested policewoman, Elsie Mouland, who took over White's case load. He described the duties of their posts to the Salisbury Watch Committee in 1929: "In addition to the policewoman's ordinary police duties such as acting as matron to female prisoners, patrolling the streets and making enquiries concerning women and young persons etc., she has carried out a considerable amount of necessary, although unofficial welfare and rescue work". When Frank Richardson initiated a photograph of all police officers in 1929 Mouland sat to his immediate left.

When White left the Salisbury Constabulary she left her truncheon behind as a gift to her chief constable. It is smaller than the truncheon used by male constables and much lighter in weight.

== Birmingham City Police ==
Birmingham was the second largest city in England. With many poor areas and sub-standard housing, it was a contrast to White's previous working area. Birmingham's police force was divided into five divisions—A. Division located in Steelhouse Lane, B Division in Ladywood Road, C Division in Kenyon Street, D. Division in Victoria Road, Aston and E Division in Mosley Street—plus the police headquarters which incorporated R Division, the Detectives Office, which was in a large complex in the city centre.

White, now aged 51 years, officially joined the Birmingham City Police on 1 June 1925 as a Lady Enquiry Officer (an attested sergeant) in R Division in the Criminal Investigation Department. From 3 June, she attended the Birmingham Police School to take instruction on General State Law, amendments to the Vagrancy Law, Punishments on Incest, Evidence and Procedure Taking of Statements and Elementary First Aid. On 18 June she passed her course with the note from her instructor, "A keen hardworking woman with a very high standard of intelligence and should make a reliable person for her class of work." The Birmingham Watch Committee were very interested in her and as early as May a councillor, Miss Wilson, had written to Sir Charles Rafter saying she wanted to make her acquaintance on arrival as soon as possible.

On 23 June 1925, White took up her full duties when an internal memorandum was circulated that she should be notified of all cases of indecent assault where women were witnesses. From her arrival White was renting an apartment in Harborne Road, Birmingham. Her appointment had been ratified on 1 July by the Watch Committee.

Later, on 8 July 1925, the chief constable asked the Judicial subcommittee that:

she be appointed under the Health Acts to work where there were cases of indecency and where women might make statements. The Watch Committee should confirm with the city council that she be allowed to enter and inspect premises where the Registry of Servants and other books are kept.

In her first year White dealt with 577 investigations and wrote to her Superintendent that her experience of the last six weeks had convinced her that her work as a C.I.D. Enquiry Officer was in excess of what one woman could reasonably be asked to accomplish, She soon had two assistants allocated to her. In September 1927 there appeared to be an issue with her not getting a rent allowance for her accommodation. This request had to go before the Judicial subcommittee of the Watch Committee where a payment of 10/- a week was approved. The Chief Constable recommended approval. In recognition of her work her salary was increased from 1 October 1926. In order to be recalled in an emergency, White had to write a specific letter to her Superintendent asking permission to go to Oxford from the early morning of 25 December 1927 until the last train back on 26 December 1927.

Meanwhile, her colleague Dorothy Peto, whom she had known since her 1914–17 days in Bath and Bristol, had taken a post in Liverpool, not in the uniform police service, but as a director of ten policewomen in 1930. Also in 1930 Chief Constable Rafter gave evidence to a Royal Commission on Police Powers and Procedure. The commission noted with satisfaction the Birmingham Force was starting to appoint women police constables. (By 1935, the women's police department had seventeen female officers, including uniformed and plain-clothes women constables and a woman enquiry officer (White) attached to the detective department.) The Detective Department by now had its own offices in Steelhouse Lane, adjoining the new central police station. By 1930 the Birmingham City Police thus allowed the attesting of women as police officers. White, already an attested Sergeant, was immediately promoted to the rank of Inspector on 1 April 1930, making her in all probability the first attested female Inspector in the country. Dorothy Peto was attested as a constable in mid April 1930. New Pay Scales were published headed, "New Pay Scales, Allowances and Conditions of Service of Women Police." At this time a new police magazine started publication especially for women police officers. Named the Policewoman's Review it published two articles relevant to Mildred White and Salisbury. The first was a letter from Colonel T. E. Fowle. concerning women in the police force. The Editor of the Review writes further "There is one policewoman in Salisbury but none in the Wiltshire Constabulary. The second was an article on the Salisbury City Police headed Policewoman in Salisbury. Salisbury has had the services of a policewoman since 1918. A Miss Mouland, the present holder of that office was appointed in February 1927. The Women Police Regulation was issued on 10 July 1931. In 1930 the police negotiated for its force members to be treated at the local Dental Hospital. This included Inspector White and any newly attested female constables. At the time of women being allowed to be attested in the Birmingham City Police, the Birmingham City Council Watch Committee asserted that new recruits had to be unmarried. This did not apply to Rebecca Lipscombe and Evelyn Miles, who had been instrumental in fighting for women to be attested in the Birmingham City Police.

Some correspondence and internal memoranda showed that in 1931 White was using tram discs, supplied by the police authority, in the city while travelling between her office, the Explosives Department, the Lock Up, and the Summoning Office and Public Carriage Office. But, like all Birmingham police officers, the discs could not be used for travel between their home and their place of work within the city centre. This situation had arisen because she was working 'split shifts' which meant travelling in and out from home twice a day which doubled her travelling costs.

At the end of 1933 there were many amendments to the Vagrancy Act 1824 which came under review; the protection of women was quite dominant and White's personal importance in CID increased. Peto was credited with using the Children and Young Persons Act 1933 to take ownership of cases involving child abuse and based on that establish a special role for policewomen. In 1933 the majority of interviews with women involved in indecency was being taken by policewomen where, like Birmingham, they were available.

With the advent of new female recruits into the Birmingham City Police, both uniform and others, their accommodation had to be increased. In 1935, White's duties increased with her receiving the authority to inspect premises and books of private employment agencies. In May 1935, White received the King's Jubilee Medal, and in March 1936 she received a special payment of one guinea for apprehending a person obtaining goods by false pretences and a person committing abortion. At a conference, the first ever held by and for women police, held in Leicester over 5 and 6 March 1937, over thirty six delegates attended including one from Salisbury. One of the speakers was CID Inspector White, Birmingham, who gave a talk on "Taking Statements".

On 26 February 1937, White had applied to her superintendent for retirement. He conveyed the request to the chief constable. There was no precedent for a woman to retire and receive a pension, despite the fact she had been paying into the fund since 1918. She had to send many letters (25 in all) to confirm her pension would be paid, writing to the government in Whitehall, London. The Watch Committees of Salisbury and Birmingham were consulted. In both 1925 and 1930 White had her superiors confirm her pensionable pay status. It was argued by some that she should serve the full 25 years to get a pension but, as a gentleman from the Home Office in Whitehall, wrote that she would be aged 69 years by this time, or 74 to get her full pension. Again, her chief constable came to her aid: he suggested she should be considered a special case, quoting a section of Stone's Justices' Manual, and that she had been of great benefit to his force. White herself suggested she retire on a reduced pension of 19/60ths or she could not afford to retire at all. The Home Office suggested that she should receive a part-pension if the watch committees of Salisbury and Birmingham agreed to it. Birmingham Watch committee agreed to the pension arrangements. Salisbury readily agreed and Birmingham agreed after her chief constable wrote that he wanted her to leave in a happy state of mind. Her record was 'Exemplary' and the reason for retirement given as 'Superannuation'. In a report to the chief constable from her Office Superintendent at the Birmingham C.I.D. Corporation Street he says : "During the whole of her Service she has carried out her duties in a most efficient and capable manner as an Officer of great skill and ability." Her retirement was reported in the Police Review and Parade Ground Gossip.

== Retirement and death ==
Inspector Florence Mildred White, aged 63 years, retired from the Birmingham City Police on 31 May 1937, and went to stay with a relative, Preston White, who lived in Talbot Road, Highgate, London, near to Kenwood House on Hampstead Heath. Sometime later, probably just before or at the start of the London blitz of the Second World War, she moved to a retirement cottage in Wimborne Road, Bournemouth, then in Hampshire.

White was taken ill in December 1957 and was staying at a nearby nursing home in Richmond Park Road, Bournemouth, when she died on 29 December 1957 aged 84. Birmingham City Police kept its serving officers in touch with previous officers in a publication called The Order, and a notice of her death appeared on 8 January 1958. In 1977 a new accommodation building was ready for occupation in the Salisbury City Police complex and a suggestion was made by the Wiltshire Constabulary, Devizes, that it be named the Mildred White Building. However, this did not come about.

She had served three Chief Constables: Frank Richardson who retired from Salisbury City Police in 1929 and who died in 1951; Chief Constable (Birmingham) Sir Charles Rafter, who died suddenly at the age of 75 in August 1935; and C.C.H. Moriarty (1877–1958), who held the post between 1935 and 1941.
