= Frank Richardson (police officer) =

English policeman (1851–1938)

Frank Richardson KPM (1851–1938) was an English policeman. He joined the Birmingham City Police in 1873 as a constable third class. Within one year he was promoted to constable second class and one year later to constable first class. In 1878 he was promoted to sergeant within the same force, and in 1882 he applied to be chief constable of Hereford, Herefordshire and was successful. He remained in this post, receiving the King's Police Coronation Medal in 1912 and being decorated at Buckingham Palace in 1917. He was at that time the "Most Senior Chief Constable of England" He had married in 1870 and had nine children of which seven were sons with only one not joining the police service. In total he and his family provided 176 years service to the constabularies of England and South Africa. Between 1903 and 1920 there were three Chief Constable Richardsons in office. He was also the chief fire brigade officer of Hereford, adding many innovations to the fire service.

== Early life ==
Frank Richardson was baptised Frank Richardson Green. He was the fifth child of James (1823–1885) and Alvina (1828–1886) Green, of Upton St Leonards, near Gloucester, Gloucestershire. His father was a builder, stonemason and bricklayer, who usually employed about five or six men. He was also a deputy overseer.

At the age of five he went to the village school. From the age of eleven until seventeen he attended a prestigious school in central Gloucester. Like his brothers and sisters, he also had to work on the family smallholding. His father and grandfather had a strong work ethic which was passed on to all the children and in Richardson Green's case it led to him using his home knowledge to set up his own business in Gloucester at the early age of seventeen. At twenty he married Mary Taylor (1851–1894) and they immediately moved to Birmingham where he started another business. Later in the year Frank Richardson Green and his wife returned to Gloucester, where their first child was born. For a while he ran a successful business in central Gloucester but in August 1872 they returned to Birmingham where he joined the Birmingham Police Force.

== Birmingham ==
At this point Frank Richardson Green dropped his surname and became Frank Richardson. He joined the City of Birmingham Police Force on 21 August 1873. He was stationed as a uniformed police officer at Moor Street Police Station, a central station in the heart of the city. The family lived in a court, a collection of houses forming a square and overlooking a courtyard, very characteristic of Birmingham city centre at this time. Birmingham in this period was controlled by gangs and was a violent city. During his time in Birmingham, he worked closely with Detective (later Chief Superintendent) Gerard Van Helden who was to become very well known later. Richardson was promoted to constable second class, in August 1874 which coincided with the birth of his second son Alfred Herbert Richardson (who was to become chief constable of Halifax). In March 1875 he was again promoted, to constable first class and in 1878 to sergeant. Promotion brought a move in accommodation to an improved location but still within the city centre. This was considered to be a very rapid rate of promotion. In 1882, the City of Hereford advertised for the office of superintendent of police and chief fire brigade officer. It was very unusual to have a post within the Constabulary which combined both police and fire chief. Richardson applied and went for his first interview in November of that year. One week later after further selections Richardson was offered the post.

== Hereford ==
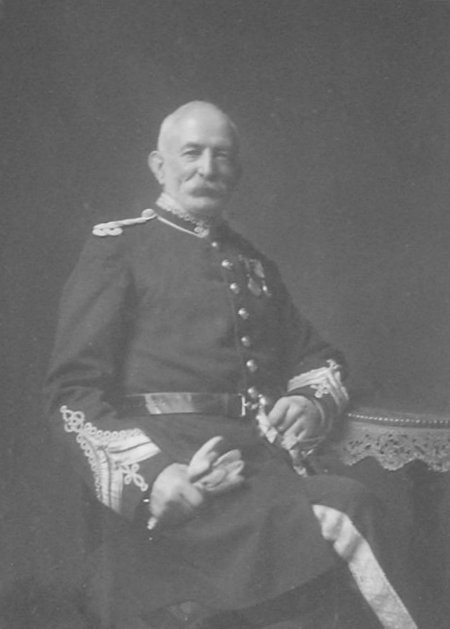
Chief Constable of Hereford Frank Richardson in full dress uniform.

The Chief Constable's accommodation was a large one-storey house on its own grounds, known as Security Villa, DeLacey Street within the City of Hereford Police Complex. This complex of buildings, built in the late 1880s, was very austere without the usual Victorian design extras. The complex also housed the fire station, the firemen's married accommodation, the single constables' accommodation, the police station, the magistrates' court and administration offices. The Hereford Police Station was a former gaol in Gaol Street, Hereford. It was built in 1841 and occupied the whole of the first floor of the building, the magistrates' court (which has a wide glass roof) and the court administration offices occupied the ground floor. The basement housed six cells, a restraining cell and police offices which were used when the court was sitting. A short staircase led from here to the witness box in the courtroom. Chief Constable Richardson in his new position had a large range of duties ranging from the licensing of hackney carriages to being inspector of contagious diseases and a requirement to always appear in uniform.

City fire departments were in their infancy in 1883 and for an individual to lead both the police and fire departments was an innovation in Hereford. Soon after his arrival, he wrote to the Mayor of Hereford referring to the possible appointment of seven men as firemen. Up until this time policemen carried out fire-fighting, and he wanted a new situation whereby if policemen arrived first at a fire, they would fight the fire but give way to the firemen when they arrived. The letter also suggests that both the police officers and the seven new firemen men should receive training as fire-fighters. This was agreed by the Watch Committee of Hereford City Council. After further discussion, the seven fire fighters were integrated into the police force, using them as constables when there were no fires to be fought. Richardson also introduced a new grey uniform for the fire fighters. A post boy was employed as a runner; one of his duties was to run to the Merton Meadows or the Green Dragon Public House in Broad Street, Hereford, to collect two horses to pull a steam driven fire engine named the Nell Gwynne. A charge of five pounds five shillings was made for attendance of the steam fire engine. The fire station had a bell which was tolled to call the fireman out. The seven firemen each had houses in DeLacey Street and electric alarm bells were installed. The Chief Constable also had an electric bell installed at Security Villa which alerted him of a fire. Also a horse and gig cart from the Security Villa's own small stable was made ready by a policeman. In later years, a taxi would automatically arrive at the front door, again, summoned by the duty police officer. Richardson took great pride in his creation. Apart from the grey uniform, red piping was later added, plus three sets of fire headgear, boots and axes and a motto "Always Ready". In 1885 300 yards of canvas hose, couplings and stand pipes and a "telescopic fire escape" were added to the equipment. This made the use of the old leather buckets obsolete. He distributed hand-held "fire extinguishers", patented in 1868, to public and larger buildings. These contained about a gallon of water in a sealed glass container within a smaller metal canister. There was a weak point created at the top of the glass and the idea was to throw it on the fire where it would spray water. In 1907 a severe fire broke out at Rotherwas House, a country gentleman's mansion with an historic chapel, just outside the city limits. Richardson broke the councils rules by rushing to the scene and prevented the blaze from spreading. Horses pulled fire engines in Hereford until 1908 when a motorized unit was purchased. As a further refinement the 1912 "list of beats" for the city police showed that certain city centre night beats were designated "fire escape beats". These were the areas with a higher risk of fire and ensured a rapid response for the heart of the city. This arrangement continued until the 1930s. The officers on the special beat list occupied a row of houses in DeLacy Street, adjacent to the police and fire stations.

It does underline the city police's role as a dual law and order and fire-fighting organization, with Frank Richardson being in charge of both organizations. Like many Chief Constables, Richardson often acted a prosecutor at the magistrates' court, so he could be out fighting fires during the night and prosecuting in court the following day. A Report by the Chief Constable was published by the Magistrates Clerk from the Hereford Watch Committee on 2 September 1898 which went into great detail concerning the Licensing of premises in Hereford. The Annual Police Return for 1899 was presented by the Magistrates Clerk from the Hereford Watch Committee who read the contents as supplied by the Head Constable, Frank Richardson, at a Session following a speech by the Bishop of Hereford who was concerned about the number of licensed premises in the city and the serving of children. A further report from the Hereford Watch Committee was published in 1899 concerning the Hereford Police Force from statistics supplied by the Chief Constable. This showed the force had thirty three officers at a cost of £1,744 from the local rates. At this time he asked for an increase in salary, which was granted. From 15 November 1899 until 10 May 1900 Frank Richardson was the Charging Officer in six cases which came to court. He was also head of the Hereford St. John Ambulance brigade and chairman of the Belmonty Football Club in Hereford. During his time in office Frank Richardson made use of the Police Gazette, a police magazine sent weekly to senior police officers. to publicize local cases in particular. An early example concerned a large amount of stolen goods. Another, the search for a male. Like two of his sons, Ernest Frank Richardson, Chief Constable of Salisbury, Wiltshire and Alfred Herbert Richardson, Chief Constable of Halifax, Yorkshire, Frank Richardson liked horses and wanted to use them for policing and crowd control. After the success of a 1906 trial and usage with the Royal Family in Salisbury, a mounted section was created in 1911.

An official photograph was taken of the whole of the Hereford Police Force in the police complex grounds in 1912 and printed in The Hereford Times under the heading "The gallant men who protect our lives and property". Also in 1912 Richardson was awarded the King's Police Coronation Medal at a ceremony in the Hereford Guildhall and presented by the Mayor of Hereford and a full bench of magistrates. A photograph taken in 1914 showing the Special Constable Unit set up in preparation for the expected war with Germany. Richardson was in charge of them as well as his other duties. During the War years these men proved invaluable in policing Hereford. In February 1917 The King awarded Police Medals and Frank Richardson was a recipient. The citation stated "Exceptional detective ability in serious cases of crime and admirable service as Chief of City Fire Brigade". He went to Buckingham Palace on Wednesday 24 March 1917 to receive the award from the King. A special police operation took place in February 1918 when an ambulance train arrived at Hereford carrying many war wounded bound for hospitals in Shrewsbury, a town north of Hereford. The policing arrangements came under the personal direction of the Chief Constable.

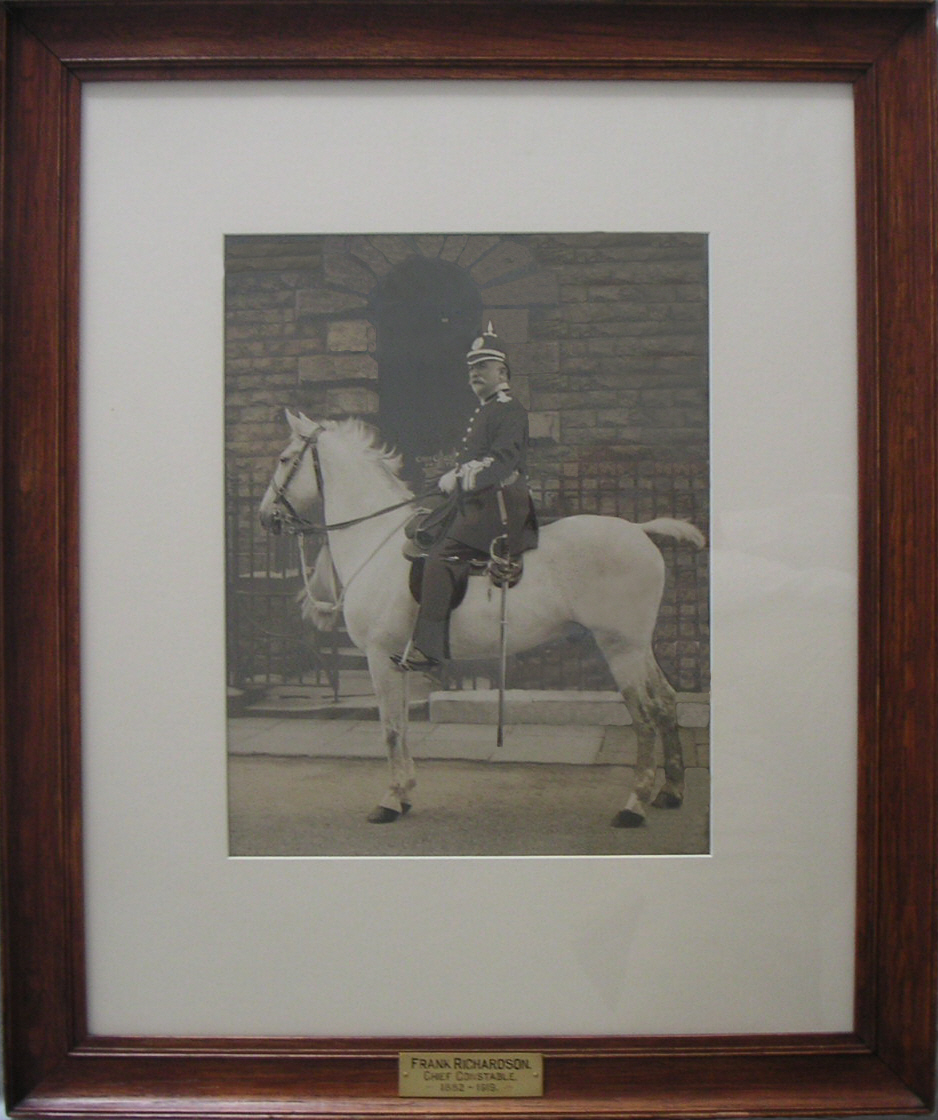
Photograph of Frank Richardson on a white horse outside the Hereford Police Station.

An official photograph of Richardson on a white horse in full dress uniform was taken outside the Hereford Police Station, Gaol Street, in 1919. This photograph was used in the local press and various publications which mentioned his career when he would retire at the end of the year. He retired from his post on 30 December 1919. His last official appearance in his position as Chief Constable of Hereford was appropriately enough in the court where he had presented many cases over the years on Friday 16 January 1920 when the mayor and city officials publicly thanked him for all his years of service. After a final bow to the court he, accompanied by his successor, Mr. Rawson, "addressed an unusually good muster of the city Police Force, who had formed up at the Parade Office at the Police Station." A week earlier he had been presented with an illuminated address by the council and magistrates. The city Fire Brigade held a separate presentation to their chief in the following week when he was reported to have made a long speech detailing the fires he had attended since 1883. He had also received a solid silver tea set from members of the Hereford City Police. During his time in office he had served three monarchs and over twenty mayors.

== Family life ==
Richardson, born in the village of Upton St Leonards, Gloucestershire, progressed from the village school education to Greyfriars School in central Gloucester. Afterwards he became a businessman before entering the police force, firstly at Birmingham and later Hereford. He married Mary Taylor from Cheltenham in 1871. Their first son, Ernest Frank, was born in 1872 and he joined the Gloucester City Police in 1892 and in 1903 became the chief constable of Salisbury Wiltshire. Their second son, Alfred Herbert, joined the Birmingham City Police in 1891 and became the chief constable of Newcastle-under-Lyme in 1901 and later of Halifax, West Yorkshire. Their third child, James William, was born in 1886, and he became a businessman in Worcestershire, a police lieutenant in the South African Police Force, then a soldier and was killed in 1907 at Germiston, Johannesburg saving some Chinese mine workers. Their third son, Harry Lionel, was the only son not to join a police force, he became the planning officer for a council in West Sussex. Their fourth son, Major Hubert, born in 1885, joined the City of Birmingham Police Force in 1904. He was stationed in the chief constable's office and rose to the rank of sergeant and stayed at that rank and in that location until he retired in 1938. Ralph Nelson was their fifth son, born in 1886, and he joined the South African Police Force and was killed in a skirmish in Florida, South Africa in 1907. He has a large monument dedicated to his bravery in the Braamfontein Cemetery. Of their daughters, Alice was born in 1881 and became an assistant matron at Worcester Hospital, Worcestershire. Kate was born in 1891 and dedicated her life to looking after her father both at work and in his retirement. Gladys, born in 1894, became a businesswoman owning two milliners shops in central Wales. Richardson's wife Mary died in childbirth in 1894. He remarried in 1896 Mary Fanny Farr, a widow of a local hotel owner and businessman Charles Farr. She died in 1912.

On 20 January 1885, Frank Richardson Green had officially changed his name by Deed Poll. This is confirmed in all instances outside of the police force by an insertion into Kellys Trade and Residents Directory of 1885. They had re-affirmed their marriage a few days earlier.

In 1900 Chief Constable Frank Richardson had become eligible for a police pension but was persuaded by the Hereford Watch Committee to stay in his post - which he did until 1920. He did however rent a house in the village of his birth, Upton St Leonards, Gloucestershire in February 1899, later purchasing it in 1912. A few years later he purchased the cottage in the village where he was born. After his retirement it is thought he never returned to Hereford. In 1926 he visited Salisbury, Wiltshire, for the wedding of one of his granddaughters (daughter of his son Ernest Frank) Doris Richardson (1905–1990) to William Walker (1900–1969) but not the wedding of another granddaughter Nora Trixie Richardson in 1933. In 1931 he marked the occasion by having every member of the family at his (retirement)house and which the local press noted by writing : A long and honourable career in the Police Force is recalled by the celebrations of his 80th birthday on Oct 3rd by Mr. Frank Richardson, formerly Chief Constable of Hereford who since he left the city has been enjoying a well earned repose in the town of his birth Upton St Leonards in the neighbouring county of Gloucestershire. Mr. Richardson had been Chief Constable of Hereford for 37 years when he resigned towards the end of 1919. He served the city faithfully during that long period. Altogether Mr. Richardson served the Force nearly 50 years and at the time of his retirement was senior Chief Constable of England. Normally in good health, he died unexpectedly in February 1938 at his home in Upton St Leonards. His funeral and burial took place at the family grave site in Hereford cemetery with many family and relatives attending plus police and fire service representatives. The local newspapers printed an article about the funeral: Largely Attended Funeral of Former Hereford Police Chief. There was a large attendance of police representatives and former associates at the funeral at Hereford on Friday afternoon of the late Mr. Frank Richardson, from 1862 to 1912 Chief Constable of Hereford, whose death at Upton St Leonards, Gloucestershire, was reported in last week's Hereford Times. Prior to the interment at the Hereford cemetery, a service was conducted in St Peters church by the Vicar (the Rev. G. Foster Carter.) The article then included a long list of mourners and wreaths. He was buried with his first wife and youngest daughter who pre-deceased him.

== Gallery ==
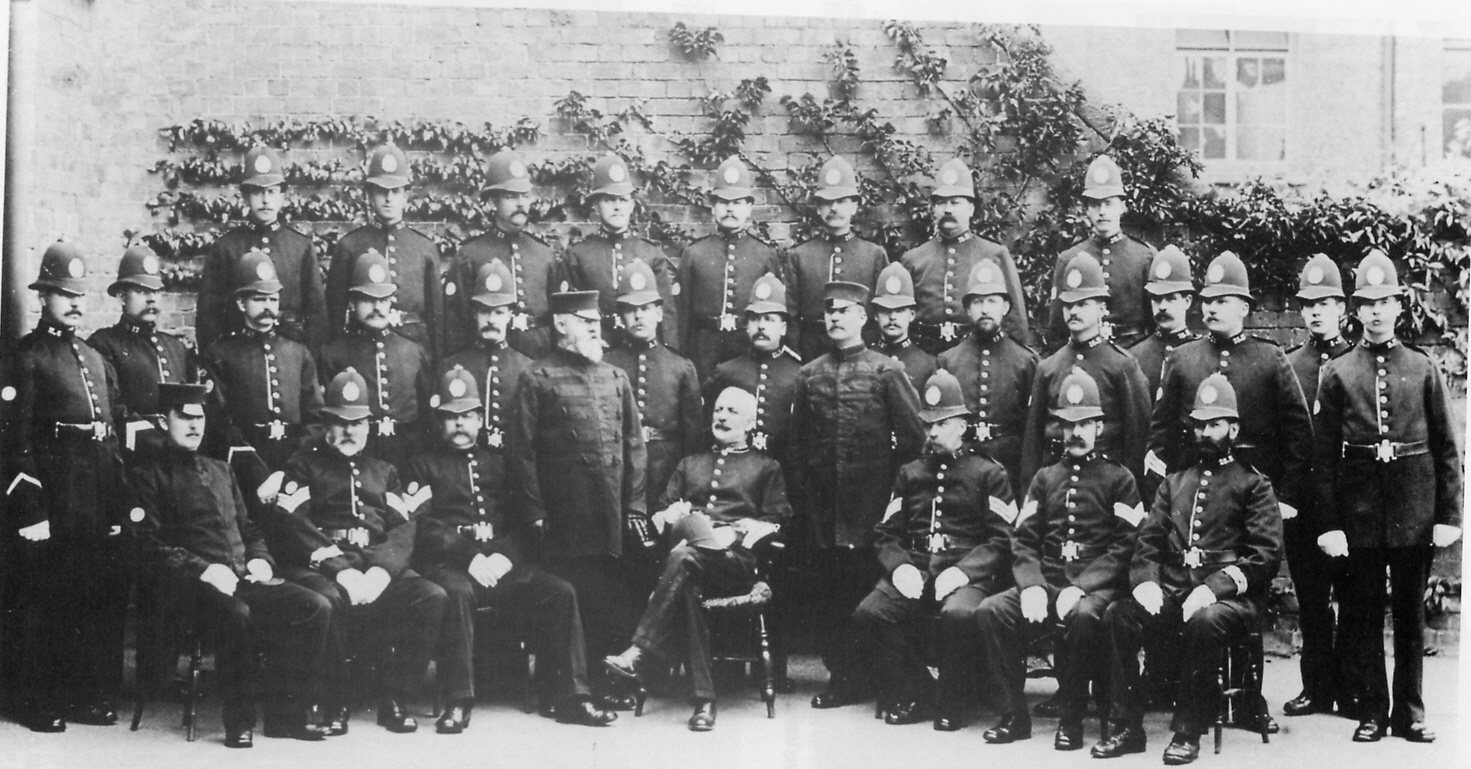
Richardson in front of his men, 1899

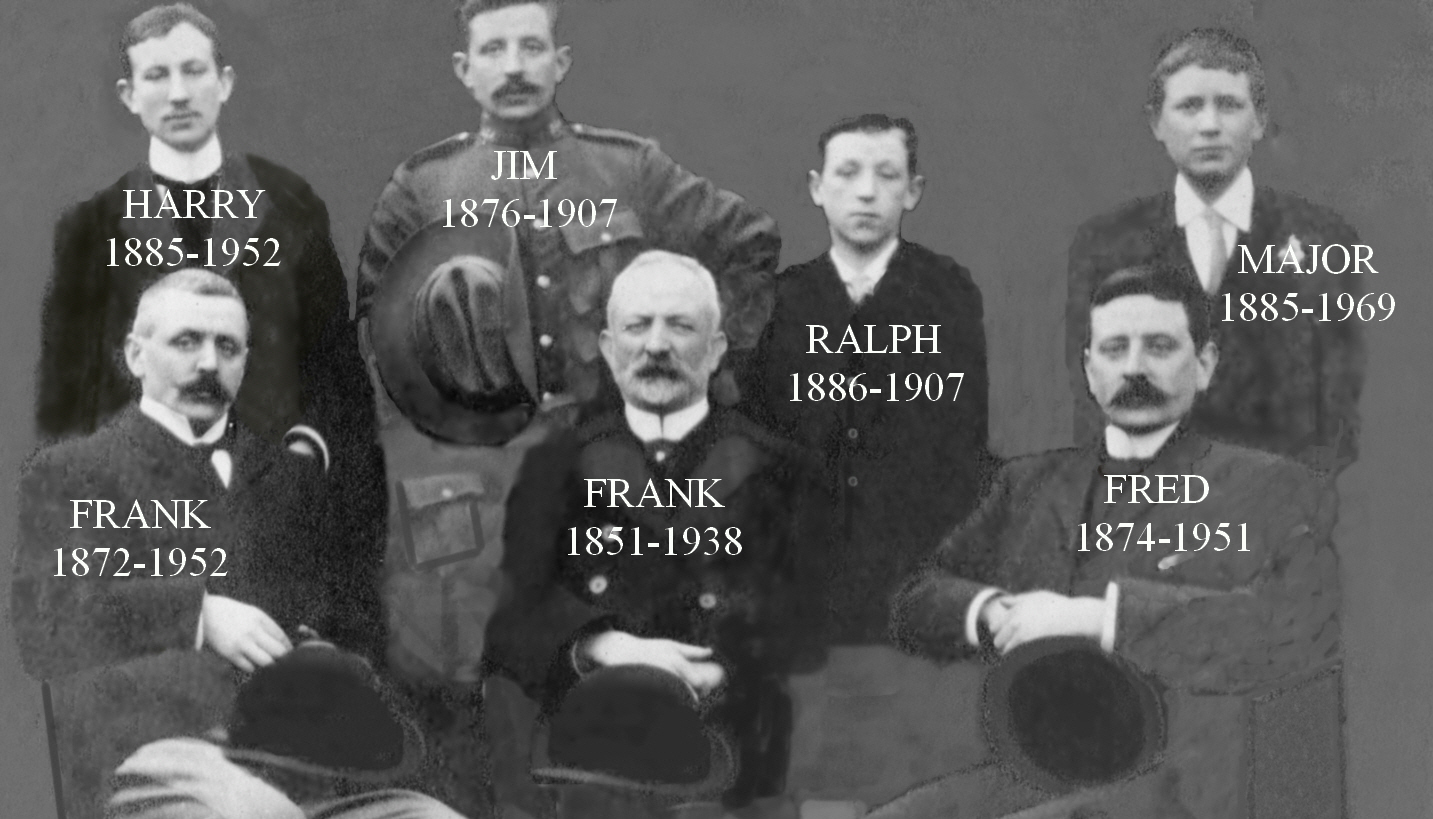
Richardson with his sons, Hereford 1900

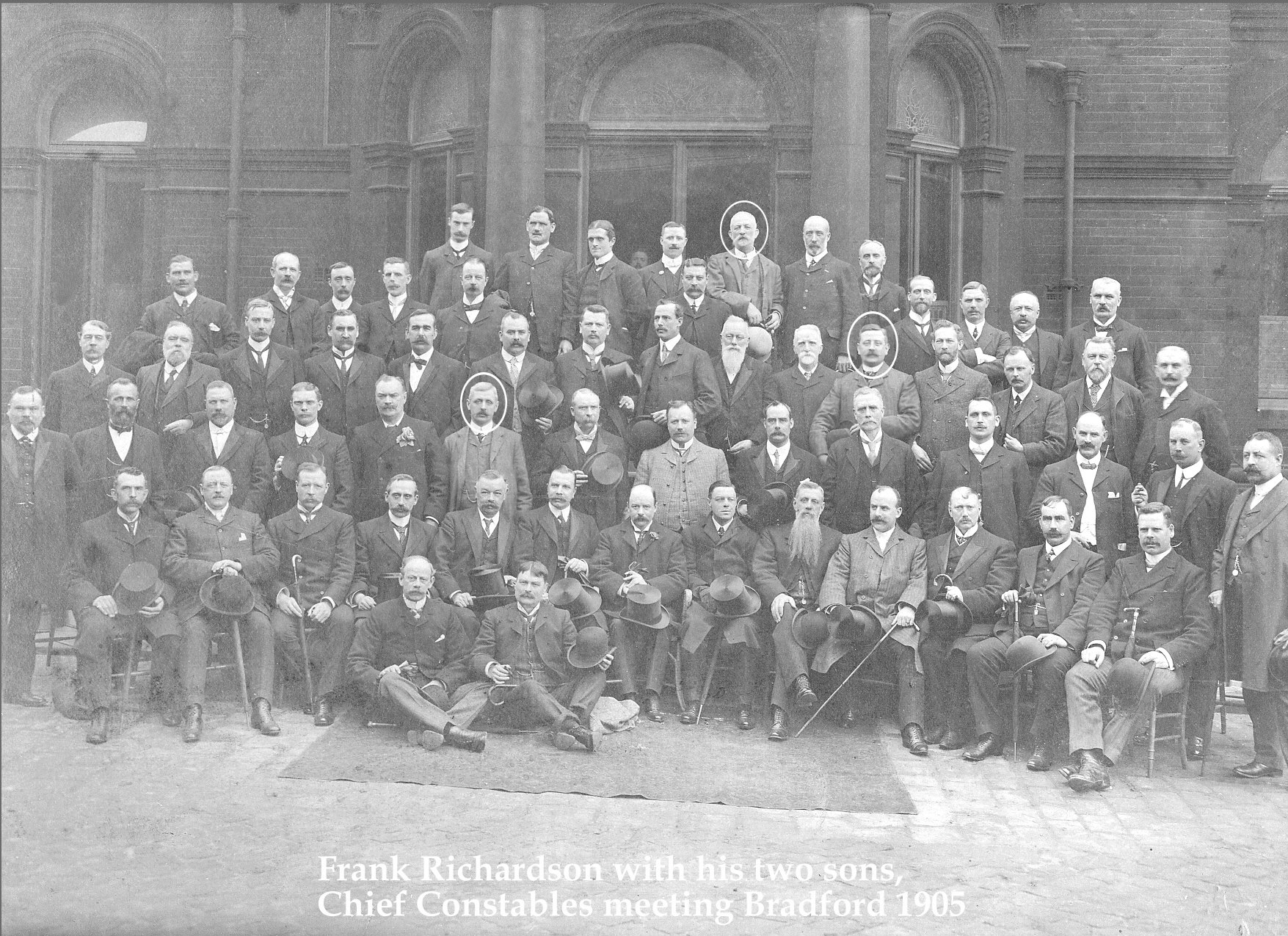
Frank Richardson with two of his sons at a chief constables meeting, Bradford 1905

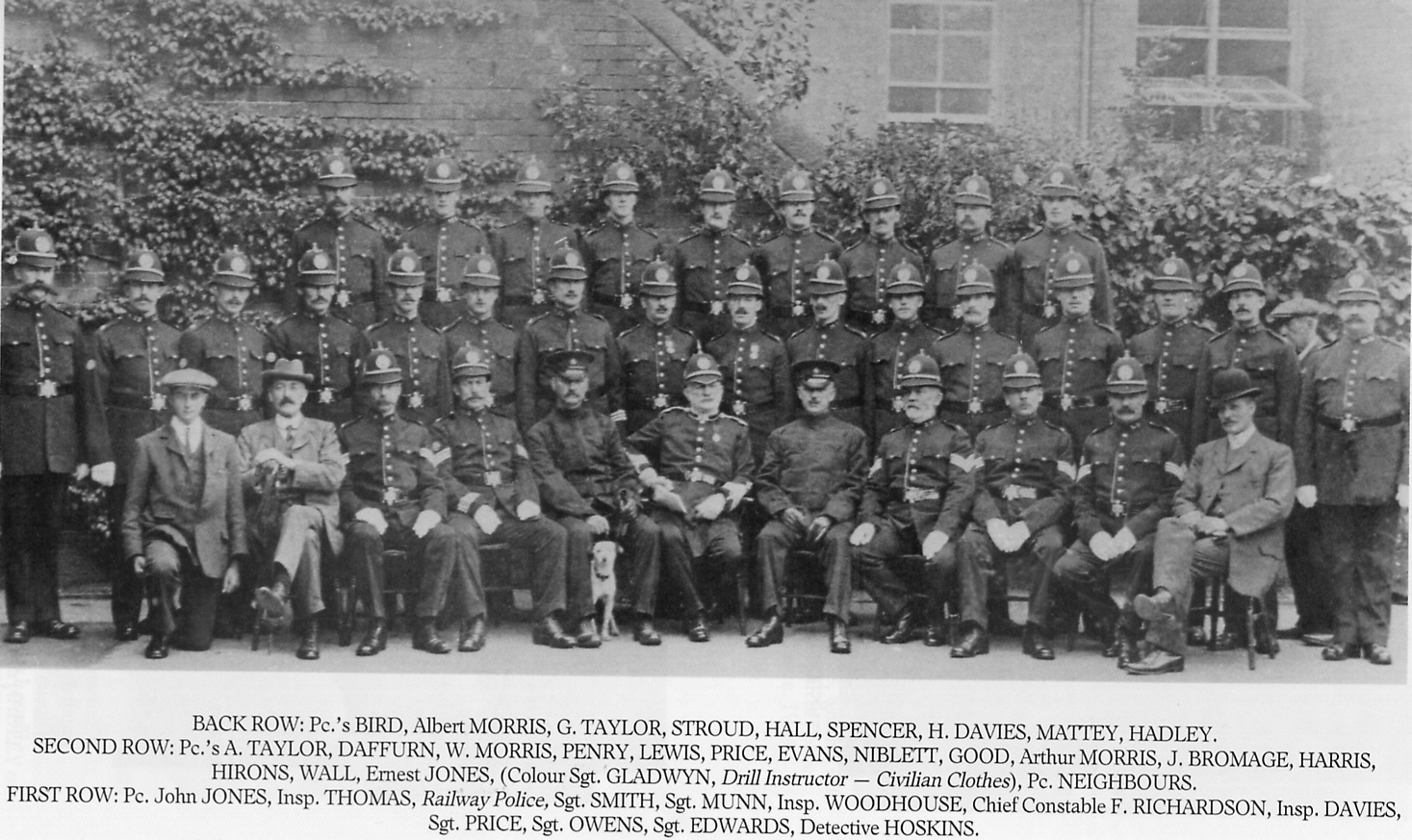
Frank Richardson with The Hereford Force 1912

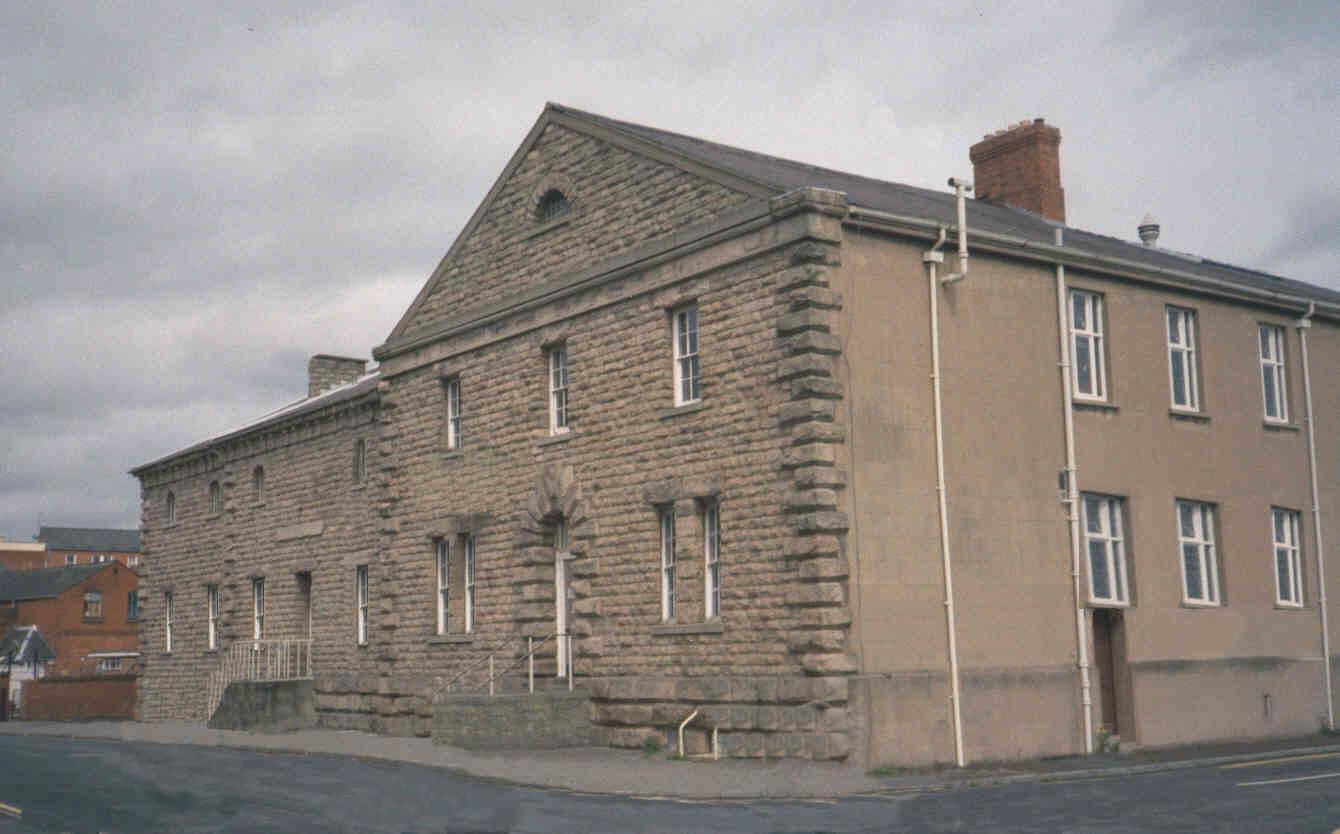
Police Station and Magistrates Court. Gaol St. Hereford.

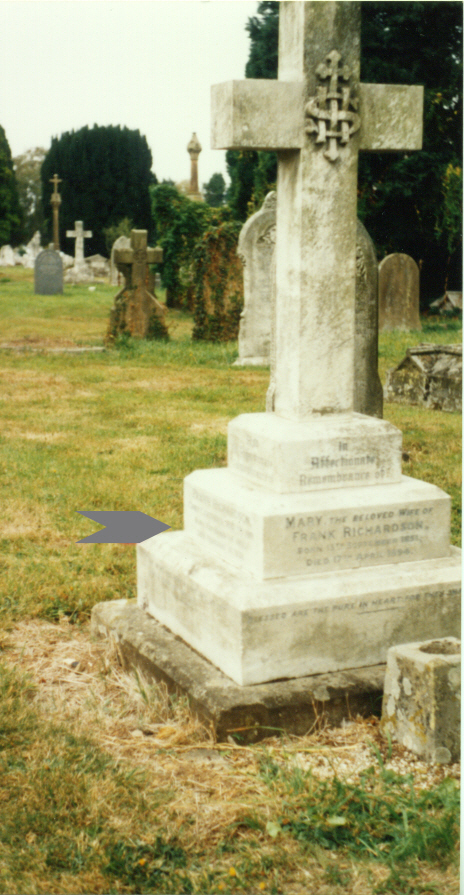
Richardson's memorial

== Links ==
- Ernest Frank Richardson
- Alfred Herbert Richardson
- Gerard Van Helden
