= Ernest Frank Richardson =

English chief constable (1871–1952)

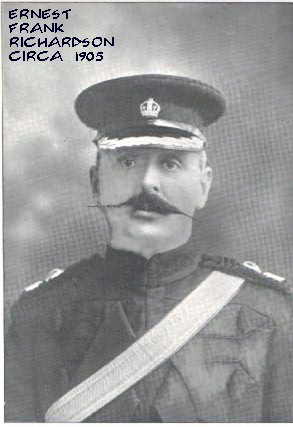
- Born: 1871; Birmingham
- Died: 1952 (aged 80–81); Salisbury
- Occupation: Chief Constable

Ernest Frank Richardson (1871–1952) was a Chief Constable of Salisbury, Wiltshire, England. He joined the Police Force in 1893 at Cheltenham, Gloucestershire, and rapidly achieved promotion to Chief Constable. He came from a family many of whom served in the police, and three family members served concurrently in the office of Chief Constable, at Salisbury, Hereford and Halifax.

== Early career ==
Ernest Frank Richardson was the first son of Frank and Mary (née Taylor) Richardson. He was born in Birmingham on 2 January 1872. From about 1882 to about 1887 he attended the Broomy Hill Academy in Hereford. He then moved to Birmingham and served in the City of Birmingham Police, Detective's Office, initially as a police clerk, in the late 1880s. He joined the Gloucestershire Police Force in Cheltenham in 1891, and within three months was posted to the City of Gloucester on a special assignment. In 1899 he was promoted to Station Sergeant and later Chief Clerk to the Deputy Chief Constable of Gloucestershire and was often involved with notable criminal cases. In particular, he became involved in standardising and indexing the early use of fingerprinting.

== Chief Constable, Salisbury ==
In November 1903 he was the successful candidate for the position of Chief Constable of Salisbury City Police. A reception was held for him at the City Police Court, where he made his first public appearance. One of the first actions he undertook as Chief Constable was to purchase bicycles for the constables and sergeants of the force, to make them more mobile, and then to ensure that every officer took a course in first aid. A photograph of the Salisbury Police Force was taken in 1905 with the police officers individually named.

June 1906 saw the Chief Constable head a large parade on horseback through the city streets for the first Hospital Carnival parade. This was a charity event which became an annual occurrence. In July 1906 he was applauded by his superiors when he organised the police, fire and hospital medical departments into a joint rescue team after a train crash at the city's railway station. Passenger lives were saved and injuries treated quickly because his men were able to get to the scene quickly by bicycle and provide first aid on the spot. A Board of Trade report was published at the end of July 1906. Most of the dead and injured were Americans from a transatlantic liner who had disembarked at Plymouth, Devon, to travel to London. The year also saw three high-profile bigamy charges brought by the Chief Constable at the City Magistrates Court which were extensively reported in the press, as was a Swine Removal Order where Richardson stressed to the Bench that regulations concerning livestock cannot be infringed with impunity. Later in the year the city received a royal visit from Princess Christian, the policing of which fell to the Chief Constable.

In 1908 Richardson raised the profile of using horses for crowd control by adding to the standard regulations. This was to protect the Royal Family, whose lives were considered to be under threat at the time, when they were visiting the Earl of Pembroke's estate at nearby Wilton. Richardson brought in extra policemen from surrounding areas; this was the first time that this had been done in an organised and professional manner. As a result, a special report was circulated by the Home Office to other Chief Constables in England on the success of the methods used, and to advise them to use these methods when royalty visited their city.

On Saturday 31 October 1908 at about 6.50 in the evening, a young disabled boy named Teddy Haskell aged twelve was murdered at his home where he and his mother lived in the city. His body was found about 10 o’clock that evening. The murder quickly attracted attention and – as was the procedure at that time – the Chief Constable immediately contacted Scotland Yard in London. At the same time, a telegram to alert 'All Stations' was issued to look out for a suspect. The Inquest into the death was held on 26 and 27 November 1908. The investigation which followed saw the Chief Constable being assisted by a County Superintendent and Inspector Walter Dew from Scotland Yard, who a few years later would arrest Dr Crippen for the murder of his wife amidst much publicity. He was not impressed with Inspector Dew who insisted Teddy Haskell's mother Flora Haskell be charged with her son's murder. Haskell was tried twice at the City Assize Court in Salisbury, once in February 1909 and again in April 1909. She was found 'not guilty' by a Salisbury jury.

In 1915, during World War One, Richardson received instructions from the Home Secretary that convalescent soldiers in hospital uniform should not have intoxicating liquors purchased for them by well meaning local citizens in public houses, since this might prejudice their recovery. He was told to inform the owners of licensed premises in the city that this consumption was against military law. Pay scales, being arranged locally, involved the Chief Constable as the head; the Police Authority for Salisbury stated it would not accept the South West Group of Authorities pay scales which were revised in 1918. Also in 1918, the Home Secretary expressed his appreciation of the work done by the numerous enquiries and reports made by the City of Salisbury Police on behalf of his Department for the Registration of Aliens project. In May 1923, Salisbury erected a large monument to the war dead in the Market Square which was unveiled by HRH Prince Edward. This drew large crowds to the area and Chief Constable Richardson received a letter from the Prince's office afterwards congratulating him on the police arrangements.

== Richardson's character ==
One incident illustrates something of Richardson's character and approach to police work. In 1904 he had to deal with the Reverend Litten, a Salisbury resident who was known nationwide for refusing to pay certain taxes. Duly sentenced to a term of imprisonment in Winchester gaol, there were threats of violence from Litten's local supporters. Chief Constable Richardson defused the situation by appearing at Litten’s house in Salisbury on the day to escort him to Winchester gaol by train, but doing so in a suit and not uniform. Litten was moved to write to the press admiring his tact.

Richardson was one of the first Chief Constables in England to attest a woman as a Constable. Florence Mildred White was born in December 1873 in Warminster, Wiltshire. She went to Baden-Baden, Germany, in 1892 to work as a teacher in a college, and then returned in 1902 to teach at the Godolphin School, Salisbury. In 1914 she left teaching abruptly and joined unofficial women's street patrols in Bath, Somerset, and in Bristol city. On 26 May 1918 she joined the City of Salisbury Police and was attested as a Constable in the City immediately. By 1921 she held the rank of Sergeant. Another female, Miss Elsie Mouland was attested by Richardson in 1925.

Richardson was tall, ramrod straight, very slim and distinctive. He had a reputation for often walking the city streets and talking about police matters to the local shopkeepers and shoppers and attended important events in his Number Two uniform (Number One uniform being the Full Dress). He is captured on an early Pathé newsreel of 1918 walking across Victoria Park, Salisbury, to talk to the city's Mayor. He was known throughout the city as "a man who liked to be seen".

== Retirement and death ==
Frank Richardson was a popular Chief Constable, and at his retirement in 1929 the city officials praised him for his fairness and tact in the city magistrates' court cases of the last 26 years.

Ernest Frank Richardson spent 38 years in the Police Force. He died in 1952 at his home in Castle Road, Salisbury.

== Family ==
Frank Richardson married Emily Caroline Hignell Tedder (1881–1946), the stepdaughter of Nehemiah Philpott (1811–1914), Deputy Chief Constable of Gloucestershire, in Gloucester in September 1899. They had three daughters and one son.

His brother Alfred Herbert Richardson became Chief Constable of Newcastle-under-Lyme, Staffordshire, in 1901, and then Halifax, Yorkshire, in 1903 and served that city until 1944. His father Frank Richardson (Senior) served at Hereford from 1882 until 1920 as Chief Constable. Thus, between 1903 and 1920, the Richardson family was in the unique position of having three Chief Constables serving at the same time.
