= Hereford Times =

English tabloid newspaper

- Type: Weekly newspaper
- Format: Tabloid
- Owner: Newsquest Media Group
- Editor: Alicia Kelly
- Founded: 1832
- Headquarters: Hereford; England, United Kingdom
- Circulation: 8,427 print per issue; 477,600 online monthly average users; (as of 2024)
- Website: herefordtimes.com

The Hereford Times is a weekly tabloid newspaper published every Thursday in Hereford, England. Its offices are based in Rotherwas. The editor is Alicia Kelly. The newspaper covers events across the county of Herefordshire as well as some on the outskirts of Worcestershire.

The newspaper was founded as a broadsheet in 1832 by Charles Anthony and until recently was published in two separate editions, the North County edition and the City & South edition.

The newspaper is owned by Newsquest Media Group.
