= Dunning baronets =

Baronetcy in the Baronetage of the United Kingdom

The Dunning Baronetcy, of Beedinglee, Lower Beeding, West Sussex, was a title in the Baronetage of the United Kingdom. It was created on 24 June 1930 for Leonard Dunning. He was Inspector of Constabulary at the Home Office between 1912 and 1930. On the third Baronet's death, the baronetcy became extinct.

== Dunning baronets, of Beedinglee (1930) ==
- Sir Leonard Dunning, 1st Baronet (1860–1941)
- Sir William Leonard Dunning, 2nd Baronet (1903–1961)
- Sir Simon William Patrick Dunning, 3rd Baronet (1939–2025)

== Sources ==
- Kidd, Charles, Williamson, David (editors). Debrett's Peerage and Baronetage (1990 edition). New York: St Martin's Press, 1990.
- Leigh Rayment's list of baronets
