= Salisbury City Police =

Agency overview
- Formed: April 1838
- Preceding agency: New Sarum Police
- Dissolved: October, 1839
- Superseding agency: Wiltshire Constabulary

Jurisdictional structure
- Operations jurisdiction: England, United Kingdom
- Area: 1-square-mile (2.6 km^{2})
- Constituting instrument: Municipal Corporations Act 1835
- General nature: Local civilian police

Facilities
- Stations: 2

Salisbury City Police was a British police force that existed officially between 1835 and 1943. It was absorbed by Wiltshire Constabulary during the Second World War.

== History ==
Policing in Salisbury, previously known as New Sarum, can be traced back to the 18th century when a local militia known as Brodie's Volunteers were instructed to watch over the city. They were overseen by the Salisbury Watch Commission who decided to disband the thirteen constables in 1836 in favour of forming a more official-looking organisation. The new force called 'New Sarum Police' was to consist of one 'Superintending High Constable', one 'High Constable', four 'Day Constables' and ten 'Night Constables'.

In May 1836 the decision to dress the constables in a new uniform was made; it was to be similar to other forces with the letters 'NSP' (New Sarum Police) on the collar. Police stations were created on Endless Street and Salt Street.

In April 1838, New Sarum Police was disbanded and reorganised into Salisbury City Police, under the Municipal Corporations Act 1835. Mr John Bunter was the first Superintending Constable, earning £40 a year. More constables were hired in the reorganisation.

The County Police Act 1839 authorised county-wide police forces, and as a result Wiltshire Constabulary was formed in October 1839.

During World War II, Salisbury City Police decided to temporarily amalgamate with Wiltshire Constabulary. Towards the end of the war, the planned separation of the two forces did not occur due to the Defence (Amalgamation of Police Forces) Regulations 1942 (SR&O 1942/1443). Salisbury City Police ceased to exist after an official handover on 1 April 1943, when Wiltshire Constabulary took responsibility for policing Salisbury. The outgoing Chief Constable was made Assistant Chief Constable in Wiltshire Constabulary.

== Legacy ==
Salisbury Museum hold the original Hazelwood & Dent badge and button dies of the Salisbury City Police. Found in a load of scrap iron by Eugene Maidment in 1975, they were donated to Salisbury Museum over thirty years later, to ensure they stayed in the City of Salisbury, rather than a private collection.

== Chief Constables ==
- John Bunter (1838–)
- Unknown
- Ernest Frank Richardson (1903–1929)
- R F Nixon (1929–1943)
