= Watch committee =

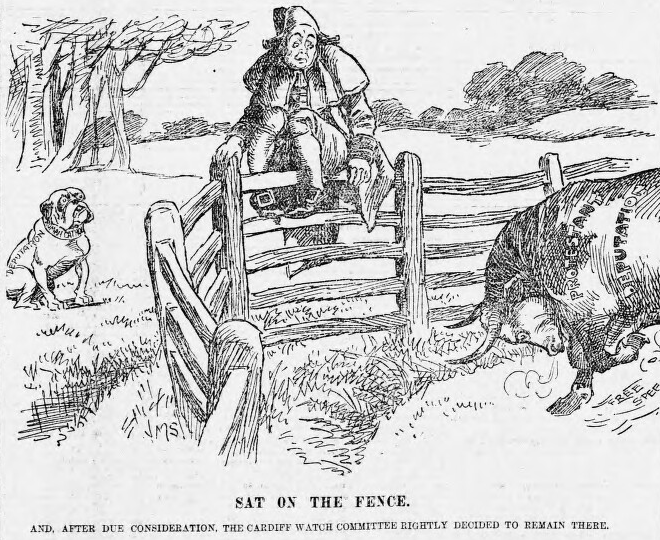
"Sat on the Fence"; J. M. Staniforth. The Cardiff Watch Committee literally sits on the fence on the matter of deputising either a member of the Catholic church (represented by a bulldog) or a Protestant candidate (represented by a bull).

In England and Wales, watch committees were the local government bodies which oversaw policing from 1835 until, in some areas, 1968.

== Establishment ==
The Municipal Corporations Act 1835 required each borough to establish a "watch committee" and to appoint constables to 'preserve the peace'.

== Disestablishment ==
From 1889 counties switched to using "standing joint committees" which also had magistrates among their members. For police forces working within a single borough, watch committees were retained.

The Police Act 1964 replaced both sets of bodies with police authorities, comprising two-thirds elected members of county or borough councils, and one-third magistrates.
