= List of Elizabeth Emblem recipients =

The list contains recipients of the Elizabeth Emblem, as of July 2025.

== List ==
Name	Age	Rank (or role)	Organisation	Date of death	Roll of Honour citation or circumstances of death	Date published of recipients approved by HM King Charles III
Bernard Goodwin Bourdillon	35	Assistant Secretary to the Palestine Government	HMG Foreign and Commonwealth Office	22 July 1946	Members of the Irgun disguised themselves as Arabs and set off a bomb in the King David Hotel, Jerusalem. The hotel had been the base for the British Secretariat, the military command and a branch of the police. 91 people were killed, most of them staff of the secretariat and the hotel, including Bourdillion.	4 July 2025
Jack Foster	20	Police Constable	HMG British Palestine Police Force	29 December 1947	Shot in attack	4 July 2025
Robert Gilchrist Broadhead Martin	47	Police Constable	Metropolitan Police	23 March 1950	Fatally injured in an accident on a wet road while on motorcycle traffic patrol.	4 July 2025
Robert Watson MM		Lieutenant	Malayan Police	29 August 1951	Unable to locate information (July 2025)	4 July 2025
Isaac Taylor	30	Police Constable	Lancashire County Police	22 May 1956	Fatally injured when his patrol car crashed during a vehicle pursuit.	4 July 2025
Sidney Leslie Dodd	27	Police Constable	Essex Police	24 February 1957	Killed when he was struck and knocked down by a car while on bicycle patrol near Tilbury.	4 July 2025
Peter Charles John Griffin	35	Police Constable	Newport Borough Police	15 March 1960	Alongside PC Hosea Pope (who was also killed), Griffin was fatally injured after being knocked down directing lorries to a checkpoint.	4 July 2025
Kenneth Gledhill	34	Firefighter	West Yorkshire Fire and Rescue Service	25 March 1963	Injured at an incident by a falling coping stone.	4 July 2025
Dennis Edward Cowell	41	Police Constable	Metropolitan Police	22 November 1965	Cowell was on duty as a River Policeman. He died in the river Thames after a police launch on which he was a crew member, capsized after a collision between three boats. PC Cowell was in the cabin at the time of the incident and drowned.	4 July 2025
Henry Bertram 'Bert' Kenna	Unable to locate information (July 2025)	Station Officer	Isle of Man Fire and Rescue Service	22 November 1965	Kenna collapsed and died after attending a commercial building fire in Douglas, Isle of Man, after entering the smoking building alone to search for people inside, before re-emerging.	4 July 2025
Christopher Tippett-Head	30	Detective Constable	Metropolitan Police	12 August 1966	Tippet-Head and his colleague David Stanley Bertram Wombwell, alongside another colleague, PC Geoffrey Fox (not yet a recipient of the Elizabeth Emblem), questioned the occupants of a suspected getaway vehicle for a prison escape, before they were all shot and killed by Harry Roberts, John Duddy and John Witney.	4 July 2025
David Stanley Bertram Wombwell	25	Detective Sergeant (Temporary)	Metropolitan Police	12 August 1966	Wombwell and his colleague Christopher Tippett-Head, alongside another colleague, PC Geoffrey Fox (not yet a recipient of the Elizabeth Emblem), questioned the occupants of a suspected getaway vehicle for a prison escape, before they were all shot and killed by Harry Roberts, John Duddy and John Witney.	4 July 2025
Brian Armstrong	31	Police Constable	Gateshead Borough Police	12 September 1966	Fatally stabbed by a youth he was questioning about theft from a car.	4 July 2025
Clive Blackburn	30	Police Constable	Staffordshire County Police	24 February 1967	Killed when he was struck by a car while assisting at the scene of a breakdown.	4 July 2025
Arthur Bertram Chadwick	41	Sub Officer	Derbyshire Fire Service	8 March 1967	Killed in Hopton, Wirksworth after being injured during a road traffic accident in an appliance he was in.	4 July 2025
Joseph Stewart Drake	36	Police Constable	Stirling and Clackmannan Constabulary	11 August 1967	Drake was killed when a stolen lorry being pursued by officers intentionally struck his police vehicle as he tried to intercept it at Dennyloanhead near Falkirk.	4 July 2025
John 'Jack' Liptrot	47	Leading Firefighter	Lancashire Fire Brigade	16 April 1968	Liptrot was part of a fire crew called to attempt to rescue three children who had entered a disused mineshaft at the former Brackley Colliery. He was overcome by blackdamp (a combination of gases with insufficient oxygen to support human life) and could not be revived.	4 July 2025
John Robson Taylor	53	Police Constable	Hull City Police	29 April 1968	Fatally injured in a police car crash while escorting a prisoner.	4 July 2025
Ronald Brewer	40	Leading Firefighter	Doncaster Fire Brigade	25 June 1969	Injured during an accident in an appliance, en route to a fire call.	4 July 2025
Douglas Frederick Beckerson	22	Police Constable	Metropolitan Police	10 April 1971	Killed in a fall through a glass roof while trying to arrest a violent suspect.	4 July 2025
Ernest McAllister	31	Police Constable	Royal Ulster Constabulary	20 March 1972	Killed alongside a colleague by a terrorist car bomb that exploded in Lower Donegall Street, Belfast.	4 July 2025
Sir Richard Christopher Sharples KCMG OBE MC	56	Governor of Bermuda	HMG Foreign and Commonwealth Office	10 March 1973	Sharples was killed outside Bermuda's Government House on 10 March 1973. An informal dinner party for a small group of guests had just concluded, when he decided to go for a walk with his Great Dane, Horsa, and his aide-de-camp, Captain Hugh Sayers of the Welsh Guards. The two men and dog were ambushed and gunned down outside the Governor's residence. Following a police search, in 1976, Erskine Durrant "Buck" Burrows and Larry Tacklyn, who had ties to a Black Power group known as the Black Beret Cadre, were arrested. Both men were executed by hanging on 2 December 1977 at Casemates Prison, the first hanging in Bermuda since the Second World War. Burrows and Tacklyn would be the last people executed under British rule anywhere (the last hangings on British soil occurred in 1965).	4 July 2025
Royston Victor Jerred	27	Police Constable	Sussex Police	4 April 1973	Killed when struck by a car while on a police motorcycle training course.	4 July 2025
John Doherty	31	Police Constable	Royal Ulster Constabulary	28 October 1973	Doherty was shot by a terrorist gunman from the Irish Republican Army (IRA) while visiting his mother in Lifford, County Donegal. He was the first RUC Constable to be killed in the Republic of Ireland during The Troubles.	4 July 2025
Robert Megaw	29	Police Constable	Royal Ulster Constabulary	1 December 1973	Fatally shot by a terrorist sniper while on mobile patrol in Edward Street, Lurgan, County Armagh	4 July 2025
Dennis Arthur Smith QPM	44	Police Constable	Devon and Cornwall Police	21 December 1973	Smith was shot dead at point blank range in Torquay, by a man who went on to kill two other people at a nearby casino.	4 July 2025
Hamish Harry Pettit	26	Firefighter	London Fire Brigade	13 January 1974	Pettit was killed during a fire at The Worsley Hotel in Maida Vale, London, after the ceiling collapsed in a room he and three other firefighters had entered on the second floor, trapping them. While the others were saved, Pettit died. Inspired by his brother's heroism, Pettit's brother joined the LFB in 1976, serving for 25 years.	4 July 2025
Cyril John Wilson	36	Police Constable	Royal Ulster Constabulary	17 March 1974	Fatally shot when he was ambushed by terrorist gunmen while on mobile patrol in Rathmore, Craigavon, County Armagh.	4 July 2025
Keith Marshall	22	Firefighter	West Midlands Fire Service	8 March 1974	A build-up of toxic and highly inflammable gasses at a fire at Hurcott Mill, a 19th-century Mill in Kidderminster, caused a massive flashover, which claimed the lives of Marshall and Sub Officer Robert Albert Crampkin (not yet a recipient of the Elizabeth Emblem), the first officers to be killed in the 25-year history of the brigade.	4 July 2025
John Harrison Forsythe	30	Police Constable	Royal Ulster Constabulary	18 June 1974	Killed while on foot patrol as he investigated a terrorist booby-trap bomb that exploded off Market Street, Lurgan, County Armagh.	4 July 2025
Ian Rodgers	25	Police Constable	Greater Manchester Police	3 April 1975	Struck by a train in Brinnington, having been responding to a report of children trespassing on the line. Rodgers suffered fatal injuries, dying approximately a week later.	4 July 2025
Andrew Alexander Baird	37	Reserve Constable	Royal Ulster Constabulary	14 October 1975	Died three weeks after sustaining fatal injuries from the explosion of a terrorist booby-trap bomb in Portadown, County Armagh.	4 July 2025
Margaret Cherry Campbell	24	Reserve Constable	Royal Ulster Constabulary	21 November 1975	Died from serious injuries received on 1 November while she was assisting other officers at the scene of a road traffic accident in Derry when they were struck by a speeding car.	4 July 2025
James Hunter	33	Police Sergeant	Royal Ulster Constabulary	15 May 1976	Shot dead in terrorist sniper attack while on mobile patrol in Warrenpoint, County Down.	4 July 2025
John Aloysius Nichol	19	Firefighter	Northern Ireland Fire Brigade	27 August 1976	Attending a property fire, the building collapsed, trapping him and fellow firefighter, Des Moynes. While colleagues were able to release them, Nichol died.	4 July 2025
Albert Craig	33	Police Sergeant	Royal Ulster Constabulary	18 September 1976	Fatally shot by terrorists in a passing vehicle as he directed traffic at Brownstone Road, Portadown, County Armagh.	4 July 2025
George William Barett	43	Sub Officer	West Midlands Fire Service	2 December 1976	Barrett was on route to carry out a routine fire inspection when the Fire Service van he was driving was involved in a serious road traffic accident with a single decker bus.	4 July 2025
Patrick Liam McNulty	30	Police Constable	Royal Ulster Constabulary	27 January 1977	Shot dead in a terrorist ambush after leaving his car at a garage in Strand Road, Derry.	4 July 2025
Kenneth William Sheehan	19	Police Constable	Royal Ulster Constabulary	8 April 1977	Fatally shot, alongside a colleague, by terrorists in a car they had stopped while on mobile patrol.	4 July 2025
David Barnes	44	Firefighter	Royal Berkshire Fire Brigade	15 September 1977	Barnes and his colleague Neil Goldsmith (not yet a recipient of the Elizabeth Emblem) were responding to a fire in a large builders’ merchants store in Elgar Road, Reading when it partially collapsed, trapping them both. Both men had died by the time they were found, with a significant fire and continuing collapse of the building hampering rescue efforts.	4 July 2025
Paul Christopher Clout	29	Police Constable	Sussex Police	27 September 1977	Killed when the police car in which he was travelling crashed while responding to an emergency call.	4 July 2025
Robert Albert James Struthers	19	Reserve Constable	Royal Ulster Constabulary	16 June 1978	Fatally shot by two terrorist gunmen while off duty at his office in Foyle Street, Derry.	4 July 2025
William Herbert Turbitt	46	Police Constable	Royal Ulster Constabulary	17 June 1978	Turbitt was shot and abducted by terrorists when he and Constable Hugh McConnell (not yet a recipient of the Elizabeth Emblem) were ambushed while sitting in their patrol car at Sturgan Brae, overlooking Camlough Reservoir, County Armagh.Turbitt's body was found three weeks later, on 10 July, at a derelict border farm in Crossmaglen. His colleague was shot dead during the ambush.	4 July 2025
Terence Kenneth Albert Saunders	34	Firefighter	Avon Fire and Rescue	6 November 1978	Crush injuries resulting from an accident during practical drills	4 July 2025
Wesley Orr	53	Sub	Northern Ireland Fire Brigade	16 November 1978	After two IRA terrorists held a security guard at gun point while planting a bomb in one of the warehouses at the Bass Charrington Brewery in Belfast, the bomb exploded, resulting in a fire. Leading his crew into the warehouse, a second blast occurred, killing Orr as he received the full force of the bomb. The other firefighter's suffered injuries of various degrees.	4 July 2025
Sir Richard Adam Sykes KCMG MC	58	British Ambassador to the Netherlands	HMG Foreign and Commonwealth Office, The Hague Netherlands	22 March 1979	Sykes was leaving his residence in The Hague at 9 am and was getting into his silver Rolls-Royce limousine when he was shot. The IRA claimed responsibility for the assassination in February 1980.	4 July 2025
Richard Allen Baird	28	Police Constable	Royal Ulster Constabulary	17 April 1979	Killed alongside three colleagues, Constables Paul Moore Gray and Noel Alexander Webb and Reserve Constable Robert Archibald Lockhart (not yet recipients of the Elizabeth Emblem). The Constables were killed by a remote-controlled bomb, hidden in a parked van, which was detonated as their patrol drove past in Bessbrook, County Armagh.	4 July 2025
Frederick John Eric Lutton	39	Reserve Constable	Royal Ulster Constabulary	1 May 1979	A former RUC officer, shot dead by terrorist gunmen at his workplace, Argory House, near Moy, County Tyrone.	4 July 2025
Desmond Kellam	31	Police Constable	Wiltshire Constabulary	3 October 1979	Kellam was killed by a single blow to the head with a billhook after chasing a burglar across a churchyard. Teenager David Octavius James was later convicted of Kellam's manslaughter. As of July 2025, Kellam is the only officer in Wiltshire Constabulary's history to have been killed on duty.	4 July 2025
Glenn Russel Corder	18	Police Constable	Durham Constabulary	6 February 1980	Killed when the patrol car in which he was travelling crashed while pursuing a suspect vehicle.	4 July 2025
William Wallace Allen	49	Reserve Constable	Royal Ulster Constabulary	31 August 1980	Allen was shot by the IRA in an ambush. His patrol was responding to answer a call when it came under fire from a house in the Rathmore estate. Wilson was rushed to Craigavon Area Hospital, but died the next day.	4 July 2025
Lindsay Gardiner McDougall	36	Reserve Constable	Royal Ulster Constabulary	14 January 1981	Fatally shot from behind by terrorist gunmen while on foot patrol	4 July 2025
William Edward Ivan Toombs	42	Major of 3rd Battalion Ulster Defence Regiment	HM Revenue and Customs	16 January 1981	Toombs was shot by the Provisional IRA at the Customs Office Warrenpoint, County Down, where he worked. One gunman covered the customs officer on duty at the door. The second gunman burst into the room where William was working, gun in hand. The gun jammed when the trigger was pulled. William tried to get to his gun which was in his briefcase but the gunman went for him. As William grappled with him the gunman, the gunman called to the other gunman one who ran down the corridor on entry to the office told his companion to get out of the way and he then opened fire killing Toombs. He was off duty.	4 July 2025
Gary Desmond Martin	28	Police Constable	Royal Ulster Constabulary	27 April 1981	Martin was killed at when an INLA bomb exploded in a lorry the police were preparing to remove. The lorry was found abandoned and obstructing the thoroughfare of a junction. Martin and his colleagues were diverting traffic from the area before moving it and conducting an inspection of it. The January 1982 inquest was told by an inspector that he had checked the cab but didn't find anything. He said Martin then volunteered to drive it away and as he was getting into the lorry and put his hand on the seat, the lorry exploded. A mercury-tilt switch had been placed under the seat which detonated the bomb.	4 July 2025
Andrew Alfred Woods	50	Police Constable	Royal Ulster Constabulary	2 August 1981	Killed, alongside a colleague, by the detonation of a terrorist landmine while on mobile patrol at Loughmacrory, County Tyrone.	4 July 2025
Snowden Samuel Richard Corkey	41	Reserve Constable	Royal Ulster Constabulary	16 November 1982	Fatally shot alongside a colleague, by terrorists in a passing vehicle at a security barrier in Markethill, County Armagh.	4 July 2025
Leonard Coleman	21	Police Constable	St Helena Police	2 December 1982	Coleman suffered a gunshot wound during a domestic incident.	4 July 2025
Geoffrey Ivor Ball	32	Police Constable	Bedfordshire Police	16 February 1983	Fatally injured at Astwick when his police motorcycle collided with a lorry.	4 July 2025
William Gordon Wilson	29	Police Sergeant	Royal Ulster Constabulary	21 February 1983	Fatally injured while on patrol, by the detonation of a terrorist remote-control bomb hidden in a derelict building at Lower English Street, Armagh.	4 July 2025
James Ferguson	53	Reserve Constable	Royal Ulster Constabulary	6 October 1983	Ferguson and his colleague William Finlay (not yet a recipient of the Elizabeth Emblem) were killed by members of the IRA while on foot patrol in Downpatrick, 23 miles south of Belfast.	4 July 2025
Noel Lane	28	Police Sergeant	Metropolitan Police	17 December 1983	As Lane and other officers, including Inspector Stephen Dodd and WPC Jane Arbuthnot neared a suspect vehicle parked outside the entrance of Harrods in London, a bomb inside the vehicle exploded, killing Lane, Dodd and Arbuthnot.	4 July 2025
Andrew Stephen Le Comte	21	Police Constable	West Midlands Police	4 February 1984	Died in a fall from the roof of the Grandfare Store in High Street, Erdington, where he had disturbed two men after hearing noises while on duty.	4 July 2025
Trevor George Elliot	29	Reserve Constable	Royal Ulster Constabulary	18 May 1984	Fatally injured in a terrorist landmine attack while on mobile patrol in Lislea, near Camlough, County Armagh. Trevor's colleague, Constable William Neville Gray (not yet a recipient of the Elizabeth Emblem), was also killed in the attack.	4 July 2025
Patrick Martin Vance	33	Police Inspector	Royal Ulster Constabulary	31 August 1985	Fatally shot by terrorist gunmen while off duty outside his home in Crossgar, County Down.	4 July 2025
Paul Richard North	35	Police Constable	Tayside Constabulary	17 March 1987	North (also known by his second name of Richard) died when a driver under the influence of drink and drugs crashed into his police vehicle in Perth.	4 July 2025
Brian Samuel Armour	48	Prison Officer	Northern Ireland Prison Service	4 October 1988	Armour was travelling in his car when a booby-trap bomb planted by the IRA exploded underneath it in the Bloomfield, Belfast area of Belfast, killing him.	4 July 2025
Bernard Andrew Butt	41	Teacher at T.P. Riley Community School	Walsall Local Authority – Department of Education and Science	21 October 1988	Died when a cruise ship sank following a collision with a freighter near Piraeus, Greece. It was reported that he was attempting to save students during the sinking.	4 July 2025
Mark Alistair Peers	31	Police Constable	Metropolitan Police	15 February 1989	Died after drowning during a training exercise with the Underwater Search Unit.	4 July 2025
Gerard Thomas Spencer Johnson	Unable to locate information (July 2025)	Firefighter	Falkland Islands Fire and Rescue	20 May 1989	Johnson and Robert Finlayson (not yet a recipient of the Elizabeth Emblem) died in Berkley Sound, fighting a fire on board a Spanish stern trawler.	4 July 2025
Gary Carl Meyer	34	Police Constable	Royal Ulster Constabulary	30 June 1990	On foot patrol in Belfast, Meyer was with Constable Harold John Beckett (not yet a recipient of the Elizabeth Emblem) when they were walking from Castlecourt to Queen Street, Belfast. Two terrorist gunmen ran up behind the Constables and shot Meyer, after a struggle with Beckett they also shot him and fled.	4 July 2025
William David Wesley Murphy	50	Police Inspector	Royal Ulster Constabulary	10 November 1990	Murphy and others were killed during an ambush at Lough Neagh. The ambush was a gun attack carried out by the Provisional IRA at Castor Bay, near Morrows Point, Lough Neagh, County Armagh, Northern Ireland targeting members of the security forces involved in a waterfowl hunting trip with other two men at the time. An active service unit of the IRA's North Armagh Brigade shot dead Murphy, an RUC Reservist, a former Ulster Defence Regiment (UDR) soldier and one civilian. Some members of the wildfowling party struggled with their attackers, and one of the constables returned fire before being killed. The alleged leader of the IRA squad, Patsy Haughian, died of cancer at age 38 in October 2000. He was never formally accused of the killings.	4 July 2025
John Spence McGarry	46	Police Constable	Royal Ulster Constabulary	6 April 1991	Killed, while off duty, by the explosion of a terrorist booby-trap bomb attached to his vehicle.	4 July 2025
Michael Frederick Hunns	31	Police Constable	Devon and Cornwall Police	26 June 1991	Killed in a patrol car crash while attending a police assistance call.	4 July 2025
James 'Jim' Morrison QGM	26	Detective Constable	Metropolitan Police	13 December 1991	While off duty, Morrison witnessed a handbag theft and having given chase, cornered the suspect in Montreal Place. The suspect fatally stabbed Morrison. The suspect was never caught. Morrison was posthumously awarded the Queen's Gallantry Medal.	4 July 2025
Michael John Ferguson	21	Police Constable	Royal Ulster Constabulary	23 January 1993	Fatally shot from behind by a terrorist gunman as he attended a call while on foot patrol in Shipquay Street, Derry.	4 July 2025
David Alan Morris	35	Firefighter	Hereford and Worcester Fire Service	6 September 1993	Died during a fire at the Sun Valley poultry processing factory, when he was trapped by a fallen ceiling. His colleague John Davies was also killed (not yet a recipient of the Elizabeth Emblem).	4 July 2025
Michael David Hill	33	Firefighter	London Fire Brigade	10 October 1993	Hill attended a fire at Access Laundry, Willesden. As part of a crew of four inside the building, the roof collapsed trapping all four firefighters. While the others survived, Michael died from his injuries at the scene.	4 July 2025
Patrick Dunne	44	Police Constable	Metropolitan Police	20 October 1993	While attending a domestic dispute at a house in Clapham, Dunne heard gunshots and left the house to investigate. Emerging from the house, he was shot in the chest by one of the men. In 2006, Gary Nelson 36, was convicted of murdering Dunne and club doorman, William Danso and was sentenced to a life sentence with a minimum term of 35 years. Danso was already serving a life sentence in 2003, after police found his 'hit man's kit'. Dunne was posthumously awarded the Met's highest commendation in 2007.	4 July 2025
Gina Rutherford	25	Police Constable	South Yorkshire Police	7 February 1994	Drowned in the early hours when the patrol car, in which she was the observer, skidded off an icy road and plunged upside down into the river at Wath-Upon-Dearne, near Barnsley, trapping her inside.	4 July 2025
Roderick Mackenzie Nicolson	43	Firefighter	Tayside Fire Service	4 December 1995	Nicolson became trapped in five tonnes of sodium carbonate ash while attempting to rescue two Perth Harbour workmen from a silo of chemical dust.	4 July 2025
Gwen Mayor	45	Primary school teacher	Central Region, Scotland	13 March 1996	Mayor was shot and killed during the Dunblane Massacre, whereby she tried to protect her class of schoolchildren against gunman Thomas Hamilton, who killed Mayor and 16 children.	4 July 2025
Alastair Fordon Soutar QGM	46	Chief Engineer Officer onboard HMC Sentinel	HM Revenue and Customs	29 July 1996	Soutar was crushed between a customs boat and smuggler's vessel during an operation to catch drug smugglers off of the Caithness coast. Soutar had already been awarded the Queen's Gallantry Medal in 1992, having helped to rescue five sailors from a sinking boat in Dartmouth Harbour.	4 July 2025
Nina Alexandra Mackay	25	Police Constable	Metropolitan Police	24 October 1997	Mackay was confronted with a violent and mentally unstable man while searching a property in East London. The man stabbed her once in the abdomen, and she died from her injuries.	4 July 2025
Bryan Moore	39	Police Constable	Leicestershire Police	15 August 2002	Moore and his colleague Andrew Munn, were killed when Leayon Dudley, 41, who had been drinking and driving a van being pursued by police deliberately rammed it into their stationary police vehicle. Dudley admitted two manslaughter charges after a retrial and was sentenced to 14 years imprisonment. He was also banned from driving for 10 years.	4 July 2025
Andrew Munn	37	Police Constable	Leicestershire Police	15 August 2002	Munn and his colleague Bryan Moore, were killed when Leayon Dudley, 41, who had been drinking and driving a van being pursued by police deliberately rammed it into their stationary police vehicle. Dudley admitted two manslaughter charges after a retrial and was sentenced to 14 years imprisonment. He was also banned from driving for 10 years.	4 July 2025
Lisa Hallworth	38	British Consulate Official	Foreign and Commonwealth Office, Istanbul, Turkey	20 November 2003	Hallworth died in an explosion which hit the consulate building she worked in. Twenty six other people, four of them Britons, were killed in the terrorist attack on the British Consulate building and the HSBC bank headquarters.	4 July 2025
Michael Liam Brady Miller	26	Firefighter	East Herts Fire and Rescue	2 February 2005	Alongside colleague Jeffrey Richard Tristan Wornham, GM (not yet a recipient of the Elizabeth Emblem) and a member of the public, Miller was killed after being engulfed by flames attending a fire on the 14th floor of a block of flats in Stevenage.	4 July 2025
Ali Abdul Hussain	Unable to locate information (July 2025)	Translator	HMG British Consulate, Basra	18 June 2006	Killed in a drive-by shooting in central Basra.	4 July 2025
Ashley Paul Stephens	20	Firefighter	Warwickshire Fire and Rescue	2 November 2007	Stephens, alongside other colleagues, John Averis, 27, Darren Yates-Badley, 24, and Ian Reid, 44 (not yet recipients of the Elizabeth Emblem), entered a building at the scene of a fire at a warehouse in Atherstone-on-Stour, wearing breathing apparatus. Stephens was not on duty at the time of the incident, but volunteered to help anyway. It is believed that there was an issue with the breathing apparatus the firefighters were wearing and after not emerging from the building, they died. Stephen's father was present at the scene, as he was also a firefighter. His last words with his son were 'just be careful, it's hot in there, just be careful'.	4 July 2025
Glen Howe	48	Police Constable	South Yorkshire Police	24 October 2008	Killed in a road traffic accident while responding to an emergency incident in Sheffield, during the afternoon, when his police motorcycle was involved in a collision with a heavy goods vehicle in the Darnall area of the city.	4 July 2025
Kenneth Thomas Irvine	30	Reserve Constable	Police Service of Northern Ireland	23 November 2008	Died with three colleagues while responding to a call for assistance from other officers in the early hours when their police vehicle lost control and struck a wall before bursting into flames near Warrenpoint in County Down.	4 July 2025
Ewan Williamson	35	Firefighter	Lothian and Borders Fire and Rescue	12 July 2009	Died after responding to a pub fire in Edinburgh. Williamson was deployed to tackle the fire in the basement and ground floor levels; however, he became trapped and died.	4 July 2025
Phillipa Reynolds	27	Police Constable	Police Service of Northern Ireland	9 February 2013	Having spent the afternoon drinking and taking drugs, Shane Christopher Frane and Conor Clarence broke into a house in the early hours of the morning, stealing a car. They drove through red traffic lights in Derry, crashing into an unmarked police car that Reynolds was a passenger in, before running away from the scene. Shane was jailed for six years for manslaughter.	4 July 2025
Andrew Duncan	47	Police Constable	Metropolitan Police	22 September 2013	Duncan was hit by a car being driven by Gary Cody (also known as Gary Bromige), 25, in Sutton, south London, while conducting vehicle speed checks with a colleague. Cody, who had 88 offences and 35 convictions, was jailed for eight-and-a-half years for causing Duncan's death by his dangerous driving.	4 July 2025
Gareth Anthony Browning	36	Police Constable	Thames Valley Police	1 April 2017	In November 2013, Browning, on foot, was hit by a stolen car being driven by Luke Hayward, as he attempted to stop him. Browning was medically retired from the police, requiring 'constant care'. He died three years after the incident. Hayward was jailed for nine years causing grievous bodily harm with intent and dangerous driving.	4 July 2025
Russell Michael Curwen	49	Volunteer blood transport biker	North West Blood Bikes	5 May 2018	Curwen was injured after a crash with a car in Lancaster, who voluntary worked for the North West Blood Bikes charity, was delivering emergency samples to a laboratory.	4 July 2025
Tammy Claire Minshall	31	Student Paramedic	West Midlands Ambulance Service	3 July 2019	Minshall was killed when the ambulance she was in was involved in a crash with a car in Needwood, near Burton-upon-Trent	4 July 2025
Jane Pickett	Unable to locate information (July 2025)	Unable to locate information (July 2025)	National Health Service	29 March 2020	Unable to locate information (July 2025)	4 July 2025
Charles Goodwin	61	Ambulance driver	First 4 Care Ambulance Service	20 April 2020	Goodwin, an ambulance driver, contracted COVID-19, spending 11 days in intensive care before dying.	4 July 2025
Dr Poornima Nair Balupuri	56	General Practitioner Partner	National Health Service	12 May 2020	Dr Balupuri was the first COVID-19 patient to be admitted to the University Hospital of North Tees, spending 46 days in intensive care before dying.	4 July 2025
Daniel Jones	30	Firefighter	South Wales Fire and Rescue	4 August 2020	Jones died after suddenly falling ill while on duty on 3 August 2020. The appliance that he was travelling in was involved in a minor crash before Jones fell ill.	4 July 2025
Rodney Moore	63	Paramedic	Scottish Ambulance Service	21 November 2020	Having retired from the ambulance service, Moore returned to support colleagues during the Coronavirus pandemic. Moore contracted the virus and died as a result.	4 July 2025
Julie Henderson	Unable to locate information (July 2025)	Unable to locate information (July 2025)	Mid and South Essex NHS Trust	1 January 2021	Unable to locate information (July 2025)	4 July 2025
David William Morgan	59	Hereford hospital team leader	Wye Valley NHS Trust	28 January 2021	Morgan died at Hereford County Hospital, where he had worked for about seven years, after testing positive for COVID-19.	4 July 2025
Jeremy 'Jack' Allen Daw	66	Technician	West Midlands Ambulance Service	24 April 2021	Daw, a retired emergency service technician, returned to work to help during the COVID-19 pandemic. While a passenger in an ambulance driving to a 999 call, an object struck the vehicle's windscreen, killing Daw. Daw had only eight shifts remaining before he was due to retire again.	4 July 2025
Nathanael Edgar	33	Police Constable	Metropolitan Police	13 February 1948	Having become suspicious of a male, Edgar and his colleague approached but the male made off. Separating, Edgar traced the male but was fatally shot. The male was wanted by the Military Police having deserted from the British Army two years earlier.	9 November 2024
Leslie Marsh	35	Leading Firefighter	West Midlands Fire Service	12 February 1949	Marsh died after suffering multiple injuries when he fell through the first floor of a disused burning church.	9 November 2024
Frank Bennett		Divisional Officer	Nottingham City Fire Brigade	8 November 1949		9 November 2024
Edward James Harwood		Firefighter	London Fire Brigade	21 December 1951		9 November 2024
Leslie Arthur Pearce		Assistant Divisional Officer	Kent Fire Brigade	29 November 1957	A fire had engulfed the tailor's shop at Oakwood Hospital in Maidstone. The fire was successfully extinguished, but without warning, an adjacent 115-foot (35 m) tower collapsed on those performing dampening down operations. Many people were trapped under the rubble and three firemen and three hospital staff were killed.	9 November 2024
George Edward Gladstone		Sub Officer	Northumberland Fire Brigade	22 March 1959		9 November 2024
Leslie Edwin Vincent Meehan	33	Police Constable	Metropolitan Police	2 March 1960	Meehan was fatally injured when a suspect in a car that he had stopped in Woolwich drove off with him on the side. He was dragged and then run over.	9 November 2024
William Wallace Crockett	32	Firefighter	Glasgow Fire Brigade	28 March 1960	The Cheapside Street whisky bond fire. Allan, alongside 13 other Glasgow Fire Service colleagues and five from the Glasgow Salvage Corps, were killed at the whisky bond warehouse owned by Arbuckle, Smith & Co. More than a 1,000,000 imperial gallons (4,500,000 L; 1,200,000 US gal) of alcohol was stored on the site and a combination of secure-proof building design and narrow streets hampered the efforts of the firefighters. As the alcohol was superheated, a massive explosion ruptured the walls outwards and covered the firefighters on two different streets with falling masonry; one turntable ladder and its crew were completely covered in rubble. 19 firefighters died in all, in what was described as Britain's worst firefighter disaster since the Second World War.	9 November 2024
Dudley Hamish Grant	36	Leading Firefighter	Scottish Fire Service	19 April 1965		9 November 2024
Stanley Edward Moore	37	Police Constable	Lancashire Police	11 February 1969	In the course of a missing person investigation Moore, in his capacity as a Police Diver, was called in to help search for the two children but drowned while participating in an underwater search at Howley Weir, on Knutsford Road, Warrington.	9 November 2024
Terence Joseph Breen	37	Firefighter	London Fire Brigade	17 July 1969	Breen died alongside several colleagues at the Dudgeon's Wharf Explosion. The London Fire Brigade had been called out to a tank farm on the Isle of Dogs in East London when one of the tanks being demolished caught fire. While five firemen were atop the structure trying to pour water in from the top to cool the tank, a worker on the site used a cutting torch to remove an inspection plate at the base of the tank. A spark from the torch ignited the air/gas mix and the tank exploded killing the five firemen and the civilian torch-cutter.	9 November 2024
Edward Alexander Barnett QPM	24	Police Constable	City of Glasgow Police	4 January 1970	On 30 December 1969, Barnett with colleagues, entered a house and questioned three men about the contents of two suitcases found there. The party separated to search the house and one of them was shot by a gunman with a pistol. Barnett and Constable Mackenzie heard the shot and ran to the scene. In trying to disarm the gunman, Mackenzie and Barnett were both shot in the head at close range. Barnett died four days later.	9 November 2024
Paul Anthony Parkin	27	Firefighter	Sheffield Fire Brigade	10 March 1974		9 November 2024
Neil MacLellan		Nursing officer	National Health Service	30 November 1976	MacLellan was attacked by patients at The State Hospital, a psychiatric hospital located close to the village of Carstairs by patients Thomas McCulloch and Robert Mone. In 1970, McCulloch had shot the chef and manageress of the Erskine Bridge Hotel in Renfrewshire and having been declared insane, was sent to The State Hospital. In November 1976, alongside Mone, McCulloch decided to escape, having stashed away axes, knives, fake identification, uniforms, nurses hats and garrottes over six months. The pair attacked and killed MacLellan and another patient, Ian Simpson, who had attempted to save MacLellan. Having killed the men, they escaped using a rope ladder, before killing a police officer and seriously injuring another (see George William Chree Taylor for further details).	9 November 2024
George William Chree Taylor	27	Police Constable	Strathclyde Police	30 November 1976	See Neil MacLellan for further details. While on routine patrol with a colleague near The State Hospital in Carstairs, Taylor noticed two men, dressed as Prison Officers, acting suspiciously. The men were patients Thomas McCulloch and Robert Mone, who had escaped after killing a nursing officer and patient. On approaching the pair, Taylor was attacked and hacked to death. The men escaped in the Police vehicle, leaving him for dead, by the roadside. Taylor's colleague, PC John Gillies, was badly injured during the incident, survived.	9 November 2024
Hylton Brearley	37	Firefighter	West Yorkshire Fire Service	14 December 1976	Brearley was killed in Netherton when the appliance that he was in overturned on ice while en route to a callout.	9 November 2024
Christopher John McDonald	19	Police Constable	Nottinghamshire Police	17 May 1978	McDonald was found drowned in the River Ryton, having been beaten with his own truncheon and a brick while attempting to arrest a burglar in Worksop. Posthumously awarded the Queen’s Commendation for Bravery.	9 November 2024
Michael Hawcroft	31	Police Sergeant	West Yorkshire Police	12 March 1981	Hawcroft was on patrol with his Inspector and while they were patrolling in Lockwood Street, Low Moor, Bradford in the early hours, they spotted two youths trying to steal a car. Both officers gave chase and as Hawcroft arrested one of the males he was repeatedly stabbed in the chest and back. He died later in hospital and was posthumously awarded the Queen’s Commendation for Brave Conduct.	9 November 2024
James 'Jim' Brian Porter	31	Detective Constable	Durham Constabulary	4 March 1982	Porter was fatally wounded while chasing two armed men after shots had already been fired at the pay office of a wallpaper factory in Woodhouses, Bishop Auckland during a robbery.	9 November 2024
Anthony John Hall	24	Firefighter	Durham County Fire Service	5 September 1982	Hall and his colleague John Donley (not yet a recipient of the Elizabeth Emblem) were killed in the line of duty when their fire engine overturned on the way to answer a call for help. Following the accident, all fire appliances were modified with reinforced cabs to help ensure the safety of firefighters in the future.	9 November 2024
William Ross Hunt	56	Detective Sergeant	Strathclyde Police	5 June 1983	While Hunt was attempting to arrest a man for a serious assault, he was fatally stabbed when members of the suspect's family attacked him and other officers with knives and other weapons.	9 November 2024
Jane Arbuthnot	22	Woman Police Constable	Metropolitan Police	17 December 1983	As Arbuthnot and other officers, including Inspector Stephen Dodd and Sergeant Noel Lane neared a suspect vehicle parked outside the entrance of Harrods in London, a bomb inside the vehicle exploded, killing Arbuthnot, Dodd and Lane.	9 November 2024
Yvonne Fletcher	25	Woman Police Constable	Metropolitan Police	17 April 1984	Fletcher was fatally wounded by a shot fired from the Libyan embassy on St James's Square, London, by an unknown gunman. As at 2025 no one has been convicted of Fletcher's murder, although in 2021 the High Court of Justice determined that Muammar Gaddafi's ally Saleh Ibrahim Mabrouk was jointly liable for Fletcher's murder.	9 November 2024
John Richard Speed	39	Police Sergeant	West Yorkshire Police	31 October 1984	During a routine check on two men acting suspiciously near Leeds Parish Church, an officer was fired on. Speed attended the scene to assist his colleague; however, he was shot. He was posthumously awarded the Queen's Commendation for Brave Conduct.	9 November 2024
Malcolm James Victor Wiltshire	44	Detective Constable	Hampshire Police	15 May 1985	Wiltshire was acting as a photographer in a light aircraft operated by the Hampshire Constabulary Air Support Unit, tasked with photographing traffic congestion, when it crashed into the ground in Ringwood. The aircraft was piloted by PC Gerald William Spencer, who also died (yet to be a recipient of the Elizabeth Emblem), who had a Private Pilot Licence and a CAA exemption.	9 November 2024
Alan King	41	Police Sergeant	Metropolitan Police	29 November 1991	King stopped to question Nicholas Vernage, 27, who was wanted on suspicion of handling stolen goods. Unaware of the man's hatred of police and the fact he had killed two people, Vernage stabbed King. He was posthumously awarded the Queen's Commendation for Brave Conduct in 1995.	9 November 2024
William Forth	34	Police Sergeant	Northumbria Police	21 March 1993	While answering a routine call in Gateshead, Forth was beaten and stabbed to death. He was posthumously warded the Queen's Commendation for Brave Conduct in 1996.	9 November 2024
Lewis George Fulton	28	Police Constable	Strathclyde Police	17 June 1994	Fulton was stabbed to death in Glasgow as he attempted to arrest Phillip McFadden As a result of Fulton's death, there were many changes in the Scottish police service, whereby officer's received stab-proof vests, side-handles batons, better handcuffs and better training in dealing with mentally ill people. It also brought about his two big legacies – Care of Police Survivors and the Scottish Police Memorial.	9 November 2024
Phillip Walters	28	Police Constable	Metropolitan Police	18 April 1995	Walters was shot dead while investigating a domestic disturbance in Ilford, Essex. Having been called to assist in the incident, he was attempting to handcuff a suspect when a gun was drawn and he was shot dead.	9 November 2024
Fleur Lombard, QGM	21	Firefighter	Avon Fire and Rescue	4 February 1996	While fighting a supermarket fire in Staple Hill, near Bristol, Lombard and her partner, Robert Seaman, were caught in a flashover. She was killed as a direct result of the intense heat and her body was found just a few yards from the exit. Lombard was the first female firefighter to die in peacetime service in Britain.	9 November 2024
Malcolm Walker	46	Police Constable	West Midlands Police	4 October 2001	Walker was deliberately rammed off his police motorbike by a man in a stolen car.	9 November 2024
Gerald Michael Walker	42	Police Constable	Nottinghamshire Police	9 January 2003	Walker was dragged 100 yards (roughly 90 m) and fatally injured by a stolen taxi as he reached into the vehicle in an attempt to remove the keys from the ignition. He died in hospital two days later from serious head injuries.	9 November 2024
Keith Malcolm Dobson	68	Police Constable	West Midlands Police	11 September 2011	Dobson died in retirement of malignant mesothelioma resulting from exposure to asbestos during firearms training at military sites over many years while a firearms officer and member of the Birmingham Airport Police Firearms Unit. Dobson joined Birmingham City Police in 1967 and after amalgamation in 1974 he worked at Erdington and Aston as an area car driver. For his last ten years he was a full-time firearms team member, retiring in 1995 after 28 years service.	9 November 2024
Fiona Bone	32	Police Constable	Greater Manchester Police	18 September 2012	Bone and her colleague PC Nicola Hughes were killed by Dale Cregan in a gun and grenade ambush while responding to a report of a burglary in Tameside, Greater Manchester.The incident was the first in England in which two female police officers were killed on duty. (Note: Two female RUC officers, Rosemary McGookin and Kelly Ivy, were killed in the 1985 Newry mortar attack on 28 February 1985.)	9 November 2024
Nicola Hughes	23	Police Constable	Greater Manchester Police	18 September 2012	Hughes and her colleague PC Fiona Bone were killed by Dale Cregan in a gun and grenade ambush while responding to a report of a burglary in Tameside, Greater Manchester.The incident was the first in England in which two female police officers were killed on duty.	9 November 2024
Neil Doyle	36	Police Constable	Merseyside Police	19 December 2014	Doyle was off-duty on a night out in Liverpool when he was killed by Andrew Taylor, 29 and Timmy Donovan, 30. Doyle was punched, with the punch being described as a 'pile driver'. It is unknown who struck the fatal blow that led to an injury in Doyle's artery in his kneck, leading to bleeding over the surface of the brain (the same type of injury that killed Australian cricketer, Philip Hughes).	9 November 2024
Rebecca 'Becky' Dykes	30	Policy and Programme Manager	Department for International Development	16 December 2017	Dykes was raped and killed by Tariq Houshieh, while working at the Department for International Development (now the Foreign, Commonwealth and Development Office) in Lebanon.	9 November 2024
Andrew Harper	28	Police Constable	Thames Valley Police	15 August 2019	Harper and a fellow officer were responding to a report of a burglary, after which Harper was dragged behind a car for a mile (1.6 km), causing his death. In July 2020, three teenage males were found guilty of manslaughter and received sentences of 16 and 13 years imprisonment. They were acquitted on the charge of murder. Harper's killing led to the passing of "Harper's Law", which introduced a mandatory sentence of life imprisonment for anyone convicted of killing emergency workers.	9 November 2024

== See also ==
- List of British firefighters killed in the line of duty
- List of British police officers killed in the line of duty
