= Death of Nina Mackay =

British police officer

WPC Nina Alexandra Mackay Elizabeth Emblem
- Born: 1971 or 1972; Essex, England
- Died: 24 October 1997 (aged 25); Stratford, London, England
- Police career
- Department: Metropolitan Police Service
- Service years: 1992–1997
- Rank: Police Constable

WPC Nina Alexandra Mackay Elizabeth Emblem, was a police officer serving with London's Metropolitan Police Service who was fatally stabbed on 24 October 1997 by a man with paranoid schizophrenia she was attempting to arrest. She is the only female police officer in Great Britain to have been stabbed to death while on duty and her killing was the first of a female officer since the murder of Yvonne Fletcher in 1984.

== Background ==
Mackay was from Essex, the only daughter of Sidney MacKay, a former chief superintendent with the Metropolitan Police Service. She attended Davenant Foundation School, Loughton, Essex from 1983 to 1990.

Mackay joined the Metropolitan Police and served in the service's Territorial Support Group for five years until her death.

== Death ==
On 24 October 1997, Mackay went with colleagues to a property in Arthingworth Street in Stratford, east London, to arrest a man who was in breach of bail conditions.

After removing her protective vest for ease of movement and then forcing entry into the bedsit, Mackay led her colleagues into the hallway, where she was confronted by a man armed with a knife with a seven-and-a-half-inch blade. He stabbed the officer once in the abdomen. She was taken to hospital by ambulance but died two hours later from her injuries. The suspect was arrested and later charged with her murder.

== Aftermath ==
At the Old Bailey in October 1998, Magdi Elgizouli, an unemployed man with paranoid schizophrenia was convicted of Mackay's manslaughter. The British-born 30-year-old of Sudanese origin had been charged with murder but the jury accepted his defence of diminished responsibility. He was detained indefinitely, initially at Rampton Secure Hospital in Nottinghamshire and later at St. Bernard's Hospital in west London.

It was subsequently reported that prior to killing Mackay, Elgizouli had served time in prison for shoplifting, was on bail for assaulting a police officer and possessing a knife, and had stopped taking his medication for his schizophrenia. He had also smoked cannabis, which had apparently exacerbated his condition, and he had an expressed hatred of the police.

A 1999 inquiry into Mackay's death criticized the Metropolitan Police for not attempting to have a family member persuade Elgizouli to leave the flat peacefully, and recommended that mentally ill people should be given greater support and that guidance on helping patients take their medication needed to be improved. Despite calls from Mackay's family, the report did not recommend that patients be compelled to take their medication.

In 2008, Elgizouli was granted day-release from his secure unit for four hours per week, plus a further five hours once each month to visit his brother. After four years of occasional day-release, in 2012, it was reported that Elgizouli was to be moved from the secure unit to a community hostel with full freedom of movement.

In July 2025, Mackay was awarded the Elizabeth Emblem.

=== Memorials ===
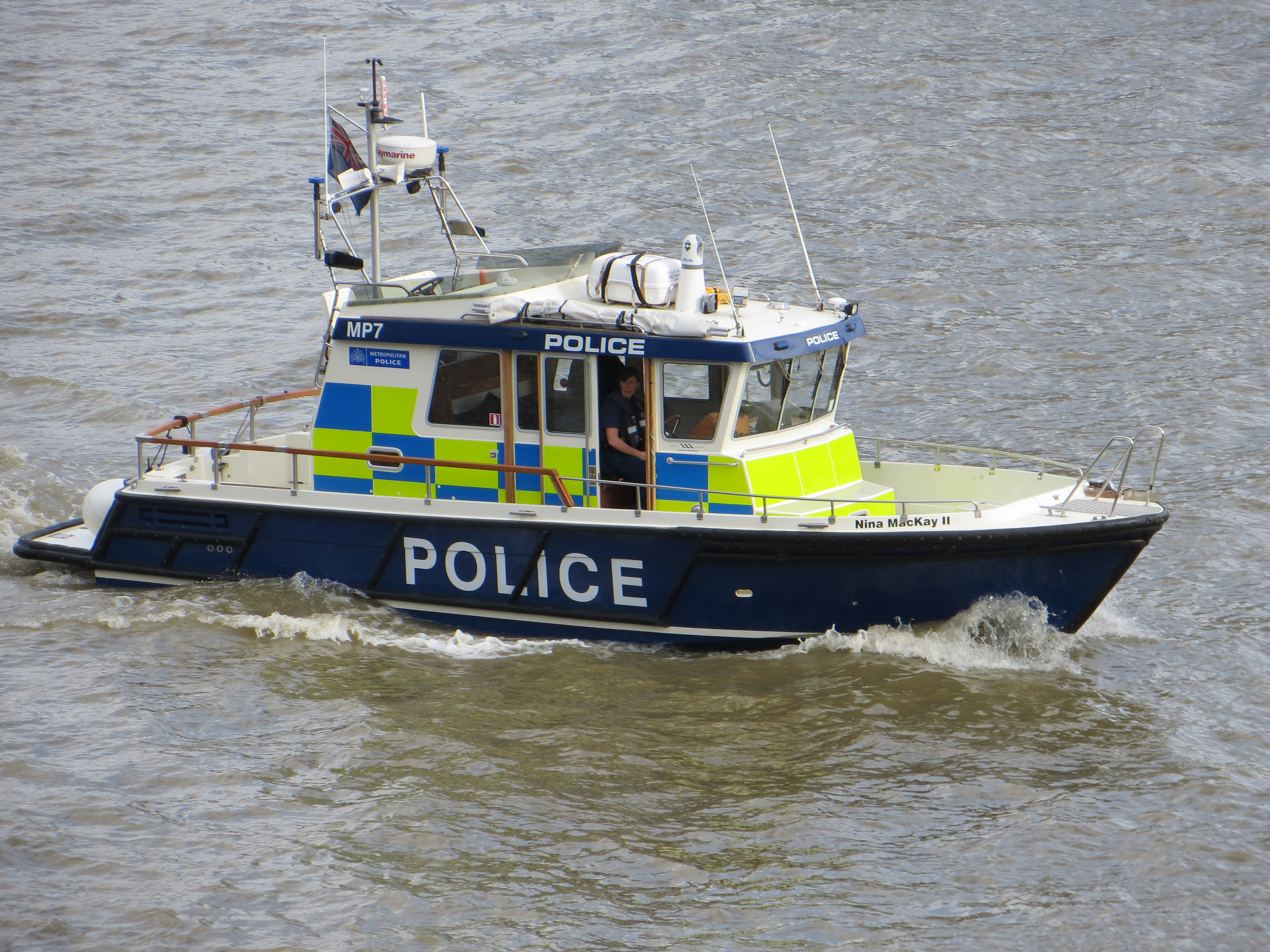
The Nina Mackay II police boat

In 1998, the Police Memorial Trust erected a memorial to Mackay at the place on Arthingworth Street in Stratford where she was stabbed. The memorial was unveiled by the then prime minister, Tony Blair.

Her former school, Davenant Foundation School, dedicated a trophy for pupils to her memory called 'The Nina Mackay Trophy for service in the community'. In 1998 it was awarded to David Clark and in 1999 it was awarded to Nick Robinson.

The Metropolitan Police Marine Policing Unit had a Botnia Targa 31 boat named Nina Mackay II, which was replaced on 17 August 2022 by the Nina Mackay III, and there is a road in Stratford called Nina Mackay Close.

== See also ==
- List of British police officers killed in the line of duty
