= Murder of Raja Ahmed =

Murder of a British police officer

Raja Ahmed
- Born: 26 June 1964; Manchester, England
- Died: 31 August 1999 (aged 35); Miles Platting, Manchester, England
- Police career
- Department: Greater Manchester Police
- Service years: 1991-1999
- Rank: Police Constable

PC Raja Basharat Ahmed (Urdu: راجہ بشارت احمد; 26 June 1964 – 31 August 1999) was a British police officer serving with Greater Manchester Police (GMP) who was killed when his motorcycle was deliberately rammed by a car thief into moving traffic.

Ahmed was the first GMP officer to be murdered on duty since Inspector Raymond Codling was shot at a motorway service area in 1989. Local man Steven Draper was convicted in 2000 of Ahmed's murder and sentenced to life imprisonment.

== Background ==
Ahmed was a part-time law student and experienced police motorcyclist in the traffic unit of Greater Manchester Police. His parents had immigrated from Rawalpindi, Pakistan in 1963, and he was born in Manchester. From 1982 to 1986, he worked as a van driver for an uncle's business. In 1986 he got training and was certified as a private security guard. Between 1986 and 1991, he worked successively as a night shift security guard at a warehouse, and a Cash-in-Transit van driver, during which time he also trained and licensed as a car and motorcycle mechanic. He joined the Greater Manchester Police Force in 1991 at the age of 27, initially working emergency response before joining the motorcycling unit in 1994

== Murder ==
On 31 August 1999, Ahmed was on motorcycle patrol in Miles Platting, in central Manchester, when he saw a suspected stolen Vauxhall Nova. Also in the stolen car were the driver's 27-year-old girlfriend, Sandra Reynolds, and her two daughters. Upon seeing Ahmed, the attacker reversed suddenly, forcing the officer to manoeuvre his BMW motorcycle between two cars.

The suspect then drove at Ahmed's motorcycle, ramming him 82 feet (25 m) forward into the busy road junction; Ahmed was struck by an articulated lorry. He was taken to hospital by ambulance but he died from his injuries.

== Conviction ==
The driver of the stolen car, 28-year-old Steven Draper of Salford, was on probation for various vehicle-related offences, including theft. He had appeared before the courts on 24 different occasions previously, including once after he attacked a police officer with a screwdriver.

Draper denied murdering Ahmed but pleaded guilty to a lesser charge of causing death by dangerous driving. He was unanimously convicted of murder by a jury of seven men and five women at Manchester Crown Court, and was sentenced to life imprisonment on 30 June 2000 for causing Ahmed's death. Draper was disqualified from driving for seventeen years and ordered to re-take his driving test if he is paroled from prison.

== Memorial ==
A monument commissioned by the Police Memorial Trust was built at the junction of Oldham Road and Queens Road in Miles Platting near the spot where Ahmed was killed. To commemorate the twentieth anniversary of the incident, on 31 August 2019 a new road near the murder in Miles Platting was named Raja Ahmed Street to honour the killed officer.

== See also ==
- List of British police officers killed in the line of duty
