= David Bieber =

American murderer (born 1966)

- Born: 3 February 1966 (age 60); Fort Myers, Florida, US
- Other name: Nathan Wayne Coleman
- Criminal charges: 1. The murder of Markus Mueller and the attempted murder of Michelle Marsh in Fort Myers, Florida, US; 2. Murder of PC Ian Broadhurst and attempted murders of PCs Neil Roper and James Banks in Leeds, West Yorkshire
- Criminal penalty: 1. He has not yet stood trial for the alleged murder of Markus Mueller and the attempted murder of Michelle Marsh; 2. Convicted of murder and attempted murder 2 December 2004, was handed three life sentences.
- Criminal status: Imprisoned in the United Kingdom

David Francis Bieber (born 3 February 1966), also known under the alias Nathan Wayne Coleman, is an American murderer. Originally from Fort Myers, Florida, he fatally shot police constable (PC) Ian Broadhurst and wounded PC Neil Roper while attempting to shoot PC James Banks on 26 December 2003 in Leeds, England, sparking a nationwide search before he was captured. He was given a whole life sentence after being found guilty of murder in December 2004 and the trial judge recommended that he should never be released; however, in 2008 this sentence was reduced to a minimum term of 37 years by the Court of Appeal, after which he could apply for parole.

== Florida shootings ==
Bieber is originally from Fort Myers, Florida. After leaving school, he was briefly a US Marine before being discharged for going AWOL.

Bieber became a drug dealer and bodybuilder. On 9 February 1995 a fellow bodybuilder, Markus Mueller, was shot and killed in Fort Myers. Police arrested Bieber, thinking he had hired a hitman, but later released him due to lack of evidence. In November 1995, Bieber's former girlfriend Michelle Marsh was attacked by the same gunman who had attacked Mueller. All four shots missed.

Bieber fled the state, assuming the identity of Nathan Wayne Coleman by stealing the identity of a deceased child and escaping the country in 1996.

== Leeds police shootings ==
Bieber entered the United Kingdom on 26 September 1996 through the port of Ramsgate, using a false passport. He was given a six-month visa, but it was extended until his marriage to Denise Horsley in Kendal.

In 1998, Bieber arrived in Yorkshire, where he worked as a nightclub doorman. He also acquired an arsenal of illegal firearms. In 2001, his wife petitioned for divorce.

On 26 December 2003, on the border between the Gipton and Oakwood areas of Leeds, unarmed traffic policemen Ian Broadhurst and Neil Roper saw Bieber's stolen BMW car parked at the junction of Grange Park Avenue and Dib Lane, where Bieber had just been into the adjacent post office.

They identified the number plates as false, and asked him to accompany them to the police car, where Bieber sat in the back seat. The officers did not attempt to search him or handcuff him. They became uneasy, however, and so called for backup.

Roper then moved to handcuff Bieber, who, facing imprisonment for various offences in the UK and possible extradition to the US, drew a 9 mm handgun and fired an initial four shots at the officers, who tried to flee. Roper was hit twice in the shoulder and abdomen, but managed to get away. Broadhurst was shot once in the back and immobilised. PC James Banks, who had arrived as backup, escaped injury after a bullet hit his radio. Bieber walked over to where Broadhurst was lying, and fired a fifth shot into his head at point blank range. It was the first fatal shooting of an English police officer for over eight years – preceded by that of PC Philip Walters of the Metropolitan Police, who was shot dead on 18 April 1995.

After the shootings, Bieber escaped down Dib Lane, and stole a car at gunpoint outside a bookmaker's further down the road. This caused some confusion in initial news reports of the shootings, which state that the shooting itself happened outside the bookmaker's.

== Nationwide search ==
Following the shootings West Yorkshire Police launched a nationwide search for Bieber led by Detective Chief Superintendent Chris Gregg. On 27 December 2003, Bieber took a taxi journey in Bradford, and on 28 December, armed police raided Bieber's apartment in Leeds.

Bieber was arrested by armed police at the Royal Hotel in Dunston, Gateshead at 02.25 on 31 December. He had dyed his hair ginger. Under his bed, he had a loaded pistol which was later determined to be the weapon used in the shooting, along with around 300 rounds of ammunition. The next day, he was charged with murder and two counts of attempted murder.

== Trial ==
The trial was held at Newcastle Crown Court and ended on 2 December 2004. Bieber denied murder, two counts of attempted murder and possession of a firearm with intent to endanger life and possession of two hundred 9 mm pistol rounds found in a storage shed. Bieber admitted possession of 298 9mm rounds, found when arrested, without a firearms certificate.

The prosecution presented evidence from witnesses, identification of Bieber's voice and DNA evidence. Bieber's defence was that the culprit was his friend who looked like him, also from Florida, that committed the offences and had asked him to look after the murder weapon. Bieber said he could not name this friend for fear of reprisals.

Bieber was convicted on one count of murder and two counts of attempted murder. The judge, Mr Justice Moses, told Bieber he had shown "no remorse or understanding of the brutality" of his crime, and the aggravating feature in the case was that Bieber did not need to shoot Broadhurst through the head, noting:

You had already disabled him and he was defenceless. You could have escaped then but you chose to wait and fire a second shot at point blank range. To shoot and kill an officer in such circumstances, doing no more than trying to serve us all, is an attack on all of us. It must be acknowledged that he might have died as a result of your first shot, but you made certain of his death.

Bieber was given three life sentences. The judge recommended that Bieber should never be released, making him only the 25th person in British legal history to be recommended for lifelong imprisonment.

Should he be released, the State of Florida, where he faces charges relating to the murder of Markus Mueller and the attempted murder of former girlfriend Michelle Marsh in 1995, has said it would seek his extradition.

== Appeals ==
On 24 October 2006, the Court of Appeal rejected a bid from Bieber for his convictions to be overturned, but ruled he could appeal against the trial judge's recommendation that he should never be released. The Appeal Court ruled that the whole life tariff was not in itself a violation of the provision in the European Convention on Human Rights against "inhuman or degrading treatment or punishment". In February 2007, it was announced that Bieber's sentence appeal would be delayed due to a European Court of Human Rights (ECHR) review of that question; the ECHR ruled in January 2012, by a 4–3 majority, held there was no such violation.

Later in 2007, it was reported that Bieber was involved in an escape plot with two other prisoners.

On 23 July 2008, Bieber was told by the High Court that he would not have to serve a whole life term, as originally recommended by the trial judge, but would still have to serve a minimum of 37 years before being considered for parole, meaning he is set to remain in prison until at least 2041, when he will be 75 years old. Paul McKeever, chairman of the Police Federation, described the ruling as "[leaving] the judiciary with blood on its hands".

== Prison officer attack and conviction ==
On 10 August 2017 Bieber attacked prison officer Alison Smith at HMP Long Lartin prison with a homemade weapon fashioned from an iron bar. At Worcester Crown Court he was given an additional life sentence, with a minimum six year additional term to run consecutively to the existing 37 year minimum term. Consequently, the minimum term is now 43 years and will run until 1 January 2047 when Bieber will be 80 years old.

== See also ==
- List of British police officers killed in the line of duty
