= Birch Services =

Motorway service area near Manchester, England

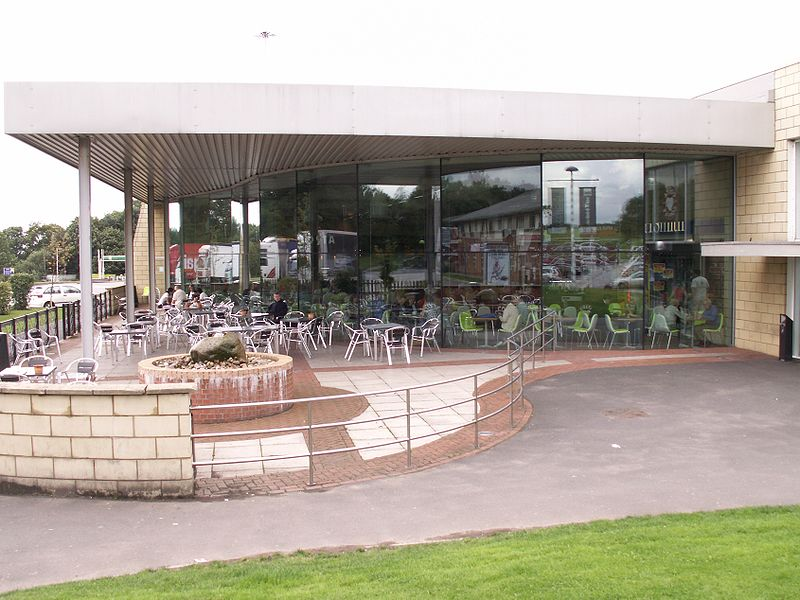
- The modern westbound services

- Location in Greater Manchester, England Location on the UK motorway network

Information
- County: Greater Manchester
- Road: M62
- Coordinates: 53.5674°N 2.2310°W
- Operator: Moto
- Date opened: 18 December 1972
- Website: moto-way.com/services/birch-westbound/

Birch Services is a motorway service station located on the M62 motorway between Junction 18 (M60) and Junction 19 Heywood, close to Rochdale and Bury. There are two sides to the service station, the Eastbound services being quite old and the Westbound services being more modern. The services opened in 1972.

== History ==
=== Construction ===
The contract was awarded to Granada Motorway Limited in late October 1968; Granada operated Heston, Toddington, and Frankley, but Granada decided not to proceed, and it was re-advertised, and Esso took the contract, to open in the summer of 1972. Adverse weather in the winter of 1969 held up construction of the M62 section by six months. Birch was meant to open around the same time when the M62 section opened, in early 1971. The site would be 33 acres (13 ha). It was planned to open the M62 section in early August 1971.

The 13-mile (21 km) section from Whitefield to the Lancashire-Yorkshire boundary opened on Tuesday 3 August 1971. Birch would open in September 1972. Construction of Birch began in September 1971. Lighting on 30 m (98 ft) high mast steel columns, each with eight 400W lanterns, was built by Balfour Kilpatrick Installations, who also supplied the 500 lighting columns for the Milnrow to Rockingstone Moss M62 section.

The architect was Challen, Floyd, Slaski and Todd. The main contractor was Shepherd Construction Limited. It cost £1.5m. Underground petrol tanks could hold 180,000 US gal (680,000 L; 150,000 imp gal).

Other Esso areas were Washington services, Woolley Edge services, Southwaite Services and Leigh Delamere services.

The 32-acre (13 ha) site opened as Esso Taverna, on Monday 18 December 1972. The eastbound restaurant was open; the westbound restaurant opened 1 January 1973.

=== Buildings ===
There were 15 pumps each side, with two, three, four and five star petrol. When it opened, diesel was 37p per gallon. Most staff came from Middleton; there were almost 200 staff, and 75% worked in catering. There was a repair facility on the eastbound side. Dudley Westgate looked after catering and David Wears looked after petrol. There was room for 400 vehicles on each side. Project manager was David Parker of Esso Tavernas.

The colour scheme in the toilets was black, white and powder blue. The two shops were open from 7am to 10pm.

=== Food ===
At opening, main meals were served from 11.30am to 3am. The hot drinks machines cost £1,600 each, with six on either side. Each week the site was serving 20,000 meals a week, and about 30,000 drinks. Two sausages, egg and baked beans was 28p, chicken and chips was 55p, steak & kidney pie, chips and carrots was 36p, tea was 5p, and coffee was 7p.

=== Murder of Raymond Codling ===
In September 1989 the services were the location for the murder of Inspector Raymond Codling of the Greater Manchester Police. In 1991 a memorial to Codling was unveiled at the place of his death by Michael Winner, founder of the Police Memorial Trust, and the Home Secretary, Kenneth Baker. In February 2010, the Bishop of Manchester, the Right Reverend Nigel McCulloch, met Codling's widow at a special memorial service at the Birch services.

=== 2003 fire ===
The westbound amenity building was destroyed in a massive fire on 9 October 2003. After losing large sums of cash in a slot machine, Jason New started kicking it to get his money back. He then went to the shop, bought a lighter, and set fire to the machine. By 1am the whole westbound side of the services were alight and evacuated. It took 70 fire-fighters four hours to bring the blaze under control.

=== Rebuilding ===
Whilst the site was being rebuilt, temporary facilities were provided. The petrol station, motel and eastbound services were not affected but were evacuated for safety reasons. The new services cater for 242 cars, 120 lorries and 30 coaches. When it was opened, Moto described the new building as being "the most modern on the motorway network".
