= Death of Michael Swindells =

2004 stabbing of a police officer in Birmingham, England

Michael Swindells QGM
- Born: Hyde, Greater Manchester, England
- Died: 21 May 2004 (aged 44); City Hospital, Birmingham, England
- Police career
- Department: West Midlands Police
- Service years: 1990–2004
- Rank: Detective Constable
- Awards: Queen's Gallantry Medal

DC Michael Swindells, QGM was a British police officer who was stabbed to death on 21 May 2004 in Birmingham whilst attempting to arrest a suspect who had earlier threatened members of the public with a knife.

== Background ==
Swindells lived in Burton upon Trent in Staffordshire but was originally from Hyde, Greater Manchester. He was a former Royal Engineers lance corporal who had served with West Midlands Police for 14 years until his death.

== Death ==
Swindells was stabbed once in the chest, penetrating his heart, while pursuing a suspect, known to be armed with a kitchen knife, on a towpath of the Tame Valley Canal underneath Gravelly Hill Interchange in Aston, Birmingham. The suspect had used the knife earlier in the day to threaten a carpenter carrying out routine repair work on a garden gate outside his council house, which led to Swindells and some of his colleagues later encountering the suspect on a park bench then pursuing him down the towpath for over half-a-mile (800 m). The officer's colleagues administered first aid after the stabbing but were unable to save him; the suspect was arrested later in Witton Cemetery, three miles (4.8 km) away, by armed police.

== Aftermath ==
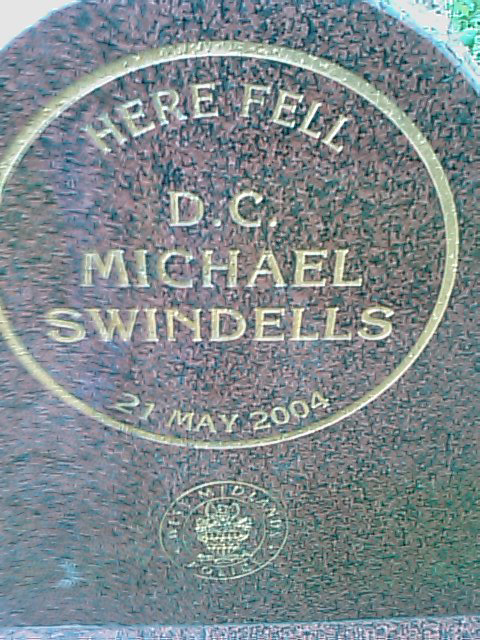
The memorial stone to Swindells at the location of the stabbing.

Glaister Earl Butler, a 48-year-old with paranoid schizophrenia who resided in a council-owned maisonette in Nechells, Birmingham, was convicted of Swindells's manslaughter. He had been charged with murder but the jury accepted his defence of diminished responsibility. He was detained indefinitely in a secure psychiatric hospital.

The jury in Butler's trial heard how he suffered intermittently with paranoid schizophrenia for between 15 and 20 years and had been treated in hospital, sometimes against his will, on more than one occasion in the previous four years, most recently in October 2001. The actions of Butler's treatment staff were criticised in an independent inquiry by Robert Francis, QC, in 2009. A total of 432 doses of the medication prescribed to Butler for his mental disorder were discovered unused in his home; he was allowed to get into financial difficulty by not renewing his housing benefit and owed rent money to the housing authority; and workers, including a consultant psychiatrist, visited Butler's residence only weeks before Swindells's death and observed a large knife on the sofa and damage to a door, but they accepted Butler's explanation that this was caused by martial arts practice and concluded wrongly that there was no cause for concern. Before the attack on Swindells the mental health services were called by police enquiring about Butler's condition and how dangerous he should be considered if officers encounter him, but staff were unable to give full and accurate details due to the poor state of the records.

Swindells was awarded the Queen's Gallantry Medal posthumously. The Police Memorial Trust erected a stone memorial to him in 2008 at the location of the incident (52.5116692°N 1.8666267°W). The memorial was unveiled by the Trust's founder and chairman Michael Winner.

== See also ==
- List of British police officers killed in the line of duty
