= Murders of Nicola Hughes and Fiona Bone =

2012 killing of two police officers in England

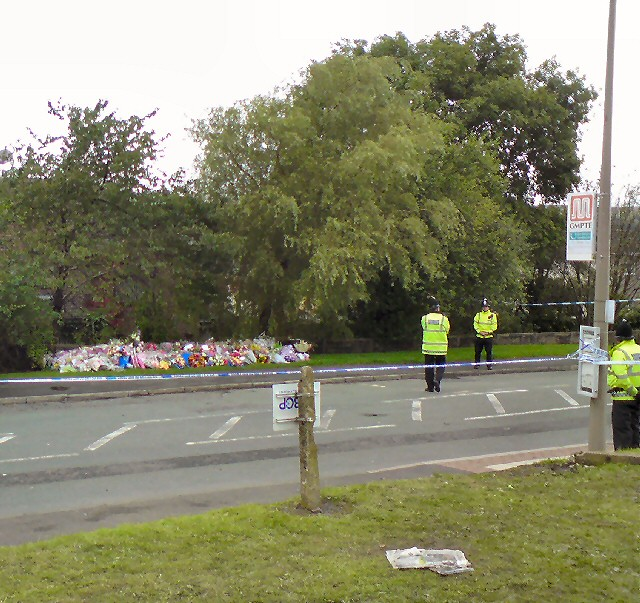
- Floral tributes near the crime scene
- Location: Hattersley, Tameside, Greater Manchester, England
- Date: 18 September 2012 around 11 am
- Target: Greater Manchester Police
- Weapons: Glock pistol; M75 hand grenade
- Deaths: 2
- Victims: Nicola Hughes; Fiona Bone
- Perpetrator: Dale Cregan

On 18 September 2012, two Greater Manchester Police officers, Nicola Hughes and Fiona Bone, were killed by Dale Cregan in a gun and grenade ambush while responding to a report of a burglary in Tameside, Greater Manchester, England.

The incident was the first in England in which two female police officers were killed on duty. (Note: Two female RUC officers, Rosemary McGookin and Kelly Ivy, were killed in the 1985 Newry mortar attack on 28 February 1985.) Greater Manchester's chief constable Peter Fahy called the attack "cold-blooded murder" and Prime Minister David Cameron described it as a "despicable act of pure evil".

On 12 February 2013, Cregan changed his plea to guilty in relation to the murder of the two police officers. Three months later he admitted to carrying out two separate murders in 2012, which were linked to a gangland feud in Manchester. Cregan was sentenced to a whole life tariff at Preston Crown Court on 13 June 2013.

In December 2024, Hughes and Bone were posthumously awarded the Elizabeth Emblem.

== Incident ==
Fiona Bone, 32, and Nicola Hughes, 23, were on routine patrol on 18 September 2012 when they were sent to Abbey Gardens in Hattersley, Tameside in Greater Manchester, at about 11 am, following a report of a burglary. This was the result of a 999 emergency telephone call from a member of the public, which was later found to be made by Cregan, who had led the officers into a trap. After arriving at the house where the burglary had been reported the officers came under attack, with 32 gunshots being fired from a Glock pistol within 31 seconds, and one M75 hand grenade being used. Fiona Bone died at the scene while Nicola Hughes was badly wounded and died later in hospital.

== Perpetrator ==
Dale Cregan was born at Tameside General Hospital on 6 June 1983 to Anita Marie Cregan and Paul Cregan, a tool setter from Manchester. He is one of three siblings. Cregan's older brother Dean was born two years earlier and a younger sister followed, before his father left the family and eventually married a former policewoman with Greater Manchester Police.

Cregan attended the now-defunct Littlemoss High School in Droylsden, Greater Manchester, where he began dealing cannabis and reportedly developed a "bad fetish" for knives. He spent eighteen months living with his sister in Tenerife. Upon his return, Cregan began collecting firearms until he possessed around ten weapons, including machine guns. By the age of 22, Cregan had begun dealing cocaine, claiming £20,000 a week in profits but always giving his official job as a "plasterer".

Cregan is known as "One Eye" due to his missing left eye, which is believed to have been carved out with a knife under circumstances unknown; he has told friends it was the result of a brawl in Thailand. During his 17-week trial, Cregan had to take out his false eye as he left and returned from court to ensure officers could check he was not hiding anything in the empty socket.

=== Arrest of the killer ===
Cregan was arrested by police after walking into a police station in Hyde an hour after Hughes and Bone were killed. Cregan was wanted in connection with the murders of Mark Short, 23, who was shot dead in the Cotton Tree pub in Droylsden on 25 May 2012, and of his father David Short, 46, who was killed in a gun and grenade attack at his home on Folkestone Road East in Clayton on 10 August 2012. Cregan was on bail after being arrested in June 2012 for questioning over the murder of Mark Short. Greater Manchester Police chief constable Peter Fahy defended the decision to grant bail, saying: "It is absolutely normal in complex crime inquiries that when people are arrested there are occasions where there is insufficient evidence available for them to be charged".

Cregan was later charged with the murders of Hughes, Bone and the Shorts, as well as four separate counts of attempted murder. On 21 September 2012 Cregan appeared before magistrates and was remanded in custody. He appeared at Manchester Crown Court via video-link from Strangeways Prison, Manchester, on 24 September and he was further remanded.

The case was adjourned until 5 November 2012, and on that date Cregan appeared via video-link at Liverpool Crown Court for a plea and case management hearing. Cregan pleaded not guilty to the murders of Hughes and Bone.

In February 2013 it was revealed Cregan had celebrated the night before with "beer and cigars" since he "knew it was his last night of freedom". He walked into a police station after the murders, saying he had "done two coppers" because police were "hounding my family". While Cregan stated that his only regret was that he killed female officers, this was deemed "nonsense" by Chief Superintendent Nick Adderley, the divisional commander, who points out that Cregan had plenty of time to see that it was petite female officers approaching the door of the house. On 12 February 2013, Cregan admitted in court that he had killed the officers.

== Reactions ==
The deaths of Hughes and Bone were met with shock and condemnation in the United Kingdom and other countries. The following day, a moment of silence was held by all of Greater Manchester Police at 11 am in remembrance of Hughes and Bone, and the Union Flag at the force's headquarters was lowered to fly at half-mast.

British prime minister David Cameron described the attack as "a shocking reminder of the debt we owe to those who put themselves in danger to keep us safe and secure". Chief Constable of Greater Manchester Police Peter Fahy described the officers as "two very brave and courageous colleagues who exemplified the very best of British policing". Manchester City Football Club lowered the flags outside their stadium to half-mast and sent flowers of condolence to nearby Tameside. They and the team they played against wore black armbands for one match and had a minute of silence. Manchester United Football Club players wore black armbands during their match against Galatasaray on 19 September 2012. Then-manager Sir Alex Ferguson attended the funerals, and said in a statement that the club was "deeply saddened by the tragic loss of two young policewomen protecting our community". Manchester City players also wore black armbands during their match against Arsenal Football Club on 23 September 2012.

The deaths briefly renewed the debate about whether British police officers should be armed.

== Funerals ==
The funeral services of Hughes and Bone were held at Manchester Cathedral on consecutive days. The service for PC Hughes was held on Wednesday 3 October with the service broadcast to the outside crowds on a screen with an audio feed. The service for PC Bone was held on Thursday 4 October with, at the request of the deceased's family, only an audio feed available for the crowds outside the cathedral. Much of Manchester city centre came to a standstill and the services were attended by officers from around the country. A memorial to the two officers was placed in Mottram Parish Church on the first anniversary of their murders in 2013.

== Trial and subsequent events ==
The trial of Cregan began on 4 February 2013 at Preston Crown Court, where he stood with nine co-accused charged with murder and attempted murder. Cregan had earlier pleaded not guilty to the murders of PC Nicola Hughes and PC Fiona Bone, and the murders of Mark Short and David Short, in an appearance by video link at Liverpool Crown Court. Cregan changed his plea to guilty for the murders of the two police officers on 12 February 2013, and pleaded guilty on 22 May 2013 to the murders of father and son David and Mark Short.

The killings of David and Mark Short were the culmination of a decade-long feud between two criminal families in Manchester, the Shorts and the Atkinsons, with whom Cregan was friendly. The deaths of Fiona Bone, Nicola Hughes and David Short were the first times that hand grenades had been used as a murder weapon in the UK. On 13 June 2013, Cregan was cleared of the attempted murder of Sharon Hark. On the same day, he was sentenced to life imprisonment for the four murders with a whole life order.

In August 2013 it was reported that Cregan was on hunger strike at HM Prison Full Sutton. He was moved to Ashworth Hospital near Liverpool in September 2013. He was transferred back to Manchester in March 2018 from Ashworth, where it was reported he had boasted about his workout regime and access to snooker and tennis.

In December 2024, Hughes and Bone were both posthumously awarded the Elizabeth Emblem.

On 4 April 2025, Greater Manchester Police confirmed that one of the guns used in the shootings of both David and Mark Short, a Glock self-loading pistol, had been recovered during a raid on a safehouse used by a drugs gang in Moss Side on 7 April 2024.

== See also ==
- List of British police officers killed in the line of duty
- List of prisoners with whole-life tariffs
- Police Roll of Honour Trust
