= Murder of Brian Bishop =

1984 murder case in England

Brian Bishop
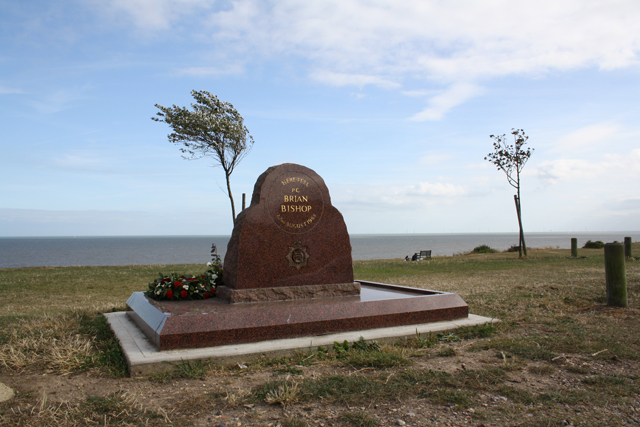
- Bishop's memorial stone
- Born: 24 July 1947; Essex, England
- Died: 27 August 1984 (aged 37); St. Bartholomew's Hospital, London, England
- Other name: Bill
- Police career
- Department: Essex Police
- Service years: 1966–1984
- Rank: PC
- Badge no.: PC 389

PC Brian John Bishop (24 July 1947 – 27 August 1984) was a British police officer who was shot in the head by an armed robber in Frinton-on-Sea, Essex, on 22 August 1984. He died from his injuries five days later in a London hospital.

== Background ==
Brian Bishop joined the former Essex Constabulary in 1962 as a fifteen-year-old cadet. Bishop was 6 ft 7 in tall when he became PC 389 on 11 August 1966 and was posted to Colchester. He joined the dog section as a handler in 1968 and moved to the Force Support Unit in 1975. Later, he became a firearms instructor. He had been assigned to the rank of Acting Sergeant before he died.

== Death ==
The epitaph next to Bishop's memorial stone summarises the circumstances surrounding his death as follows:

Brian Bishop, a member of the Essex Police tactical firearms group, was called here to await the return of an armed robber to collect stolen money which he had hidden following post office raids in Walton and Frinton. Brian challenged the suspect who immediately opened fire causing extensive head injuries from which Brian subsequently died. A man was convicted of his murder.

Five days after the shooting in Central Avenue near Frinton's seafront took place, Bishop died at St. Bartholomew's Hospital in Smithfield, London, on 27 August 1984. His colleague Sergeant Mervyn Fairweather, who was shot in the groin in the same incident, later recovered.

== Conviction ==
Colin Richards, a 35-year-old man from Brentwood, was arrested at the scene after another of Bishop's colleagues returned fire. Richards's injuries resulted in paralysis from the waist downwards. He was found guilty of Bishop's murder and of wounding Fairweather (having been charged with the latter's attempted murder) at Norwich Crown Court on 19 July 1985, and was sentenced to life imprisonment with a minimum tariff of 20 years.

== Memorial ==
On 19 February 1986, the then Home Secretary, Douglas Hurd, unveiled a brown granite memorial stone adjacent to the seafront site where Bishop was shot. Bishop's memorial was only the third to be funded and erected by the Police Memorial Trust, and was the first to be sited outside London.

== See also ==
- List of British police officers killed in the line of duty
