= Linwood bank robbery =

Linwood, Renfrewshire, Scotland

The Linwood bank robbery was a bank robbery that occurred in Linwood, near Glasgow, in 1969. Three police officers were shot in the aftermath (two were fatally wounded) and two officers were later awarded George Medals. The lead robber, Howard Wilson, served 32 years in prison for the robbery, the murder of two officers and the attempted murder of a third; he was paroled in 2002.

== Robbery ==
On Tuesday 30 December 1969, a gang of three robbers attacked a Clydesdale Bank branch in Bridge Street, Linwood. The leader of the gang was Howard Wilson, a former police officer who had resigned, disillusioned at his lack of promotion and now in debt. The others were John Sim, a policeman-turned-salesman, and Ian Donaldson, a car mechanic.

Shortly after they robbed the bank, a City of Glasgow Police officer, Inspector Andrew Hyslop, spotted them unloading the loot (which amounted to around £14,000) from a car into a flat in Allison Street, Glasgow. Hyslop just happened to be passing and was not yet aware of the robbery but thought the trio were acting suspiciously. When he investigated with some of his colleagues, Wilson pulled out a handgun and shot three officers, all in the head: Hyslop, Acting Detective Constable Angus MacKenzie, and Police Constable Edward Barnett. Another constable, John Sellars, took refuge in the flat's bathroom and radioed for backup. As MacKenzie lay wounded on the floor, Wilson held the gun to his forehead and shot again; he was about to shoot Hyslop again when he was tackled and disarmed by Police Constable John Campbell. MacKenzie died at the scene and Barnett in hospital a few days later.

== Aftermath ==
Wilson eventually pleaded guilty to two charges of murder – the first time anyone had pleaded guilty to a double murder charge in Scotland – and one count of attempted murder. He was sentenced to life imprisonment with a minimum term of 25 years. Sim and Donaldson were jailed for 12 years each for their roles in the robbery; Sim had witnessed the shootings but taken no part and Donaldson had fled the scene.

Campbell and Hyslop were both later awarded the George Medal for their bravery, while Barnett and MacKenzie were posthumously awarded the Queen's Police Medal. Hyslop was forced to retire from the police force due to his injuries; he died on Islay in November 2000, aged 74. A family friend told how for every night until his death the former inspector had been haunted by the shootings of his colleagues.

It is widely believed that the same gang had violently robbed the British Linen Bank in nearby Williamwood for £20,000 a few months earlier, along with a fourth man, getaway driver Archibald McGeachie. The subsequent whereabouts of McGeachie remain unknown and there is a rumour that he is buried in the pillars of the Kingston Bridge in Glasgow, perhaps killed by Wilson when he refused to take part in the Linwood robbery.

Wilson, whose crime occurred two weeks after the death penalty was abolished, was released on parole in September 2002, aged 64, after serving nearly 33 years in prison. While incarcerated, he wrote a crime novel entitled Angels of Death which won a Koestler award.

== See also ==
- List of bank robbers and robberies
- List of British police officers killed in the line of duty
- List of heists in the United Kingdom
