= Murder of Jonathan Henry =

2007 murder case in the United Kingdom

Jonathan Henry
- Born: 1 January 1971; Bedfordshire, England
- Died: 11 June 2007 (aged 36); Luton and Dunstable Hospital, Bedfordshire, England, United Kingdom
- Other name: Jon
- Police career
- Department: Bedfordshire Police
- Service years: 2004–2007
- Rank: Police Constable

PC Jonathan Charles Henry (1 January 1971 – 11 June 2007) was a British police officer who was murdered in Luton, Bedfordshire, whilst on duty and responding to reports of a stabbing in the town centre.

== Background ==
Henry had served in the Bedfordshire Police force for three years prior to his death, and worked previously as a floor fitter in the Luton area. He married Mary in 2005 and had an infant daughter, Maggie.

== Murder ==
At around 7:18 am on 11 June 2007, having begun his shift at 7 am, Henry responded to 999 calls reporting a stabbing on George Street in Luton town centre. A window cleaner, Stephen Chamberlain, had been stabbed in a random attack. Henry approached the suspect from behind to attempt to arrest him but was stabbed in the chest with a 4 1/2-inch (11 cm) knife; he was stabbed a second time as he lay on the ground wounded.

Another window cleaner, David Knight who was also stabbed in the arm, struck the suspect over the head with a window cleaning pole. Police back-up officers then used a baton round and two shots from a Taser to subdue the suspect.

Henry was taken to Luton and Dunstable Hospital by ambulance but died of his injuries later that day.

== Conviction ==
Ikechukwu Tennyson Obih, a 29-year-old Nigerian immigrant, was convicted of Henry's murder on 26 March 2009 and sentenced to life imprisonment with a minimum tariff of 25 years by Mr Justice Bean.

Obih abused alcohol and cannabis and from 2004 he heard voices and hallucinations and had delusions. During his trial the jury heard how Obih believed that he had special powers, could predict the future, and could make something explode just by pointing at it. He also distrusted the police.

Obih had denied the charge of murder, but admitted manslaughter on the grounds of diminished responsibility. The jury rejected this defence and found him guilty of the murder of Henry, the attempted murder of Chamberlain and the wounding with intent of Knight (he was found not guilty of the attempted murder of Knight). Obih was also convicted of aggravated burglary and assault occasioning actual bodily harm in a separate incident on the same day. The judge accepted that Obih's schizophrenia was a mitigating factor in the case, and recommended that he receive psychiatric rehabilitation at a high-security mental hospital.

== Memorial ==
In 2008 the Police Memorial Trust erected a stone memorial to PC Henry near the location of his murder in George Street, Luton. Present at the unveiling was the Trust's founder Michael Winner and the then Prime Minister Gordon Brown.

== See also ==
- List of British police officers killed in the line of duty
