= Killing of Andrew Harper =

British police officer killed in the line of duty

Andrew Harper
- Born: 22 March 1991
- Died: 15 August 2019 (aged 28); Sulhamstead, Berkshire, England
- Cause of death: Multiple injuries
- Known for: Police constable killed in the line of duty
- Spouse: Lissie Harper (m. 2019)
- Police career
- Country: United Kingdom
- Department: Thames Valley Police
- Service years: 2010–2019
- Rank: Police Constable
- Badge no.: 7605

On 15 August 2019, Andrew Harper, a 28-year-old Thames Valley Police constable, was killed in the line of duty near Sulhamstead, Berkshire, England. Harper and a fellow officer were responding to a report of a burglary, after which Harper was dragged behind a car for a mile (1.6 km), causing his death. In July 2020, three teenage males were found guilty of manslaughter and received sentences of 16 and 13 years' imprisonment. They were acquitted on the charge of murder.

In 2022, "Harper's Law" was passed, introducing a mandatory life sentence for anyone convicted of manslaughter of an emergency worker acting in the line of duty whilst committing a crime.

In 2026, Thames Valley Police, the Police Federation of England and Wales, Harper's family, and the public voiced opposition to the Sentencing Act 2026, which would automatically release two of Harper's killers in 2027 after serving half of their sentence.

== Background ==
Andrew James Harper (22 March 1991 – 15 August 2019) grew up in Wallingford. He was educated at The Henley College, where he showed an ambition for joining the police.

Harper joined Thames Valley Police (TVP) as a special constable in 2010 at the age of 19, before joining as a regular police constable in 2011. He joined the force's road policing unit approximately six weeks before his death and was based at Abingdon station. On 18 July 2019, Harper married his partner of 13 years, Lissie (née Beckett). They had been expecting to go on their honeymoon in mid-August.

== Incident ==
At 23:17 BST on 15 August 2019, TVP received a 999 call from a property near Stanford Dingley in Berkshire reporting a burglary-in-progress and theft of a quad bike. The thieves had allegedly attempted to steal the vehicle earlier in the day but had an "intimidatory" altercation with its owner, who prevented the attempted theft but did not alert the police.

Harper and fellow constable Andrew Shaw, who were finishing a surveillance shift in Reading, responded to the call in their unmarked BMW police car; Harper was the passenger. At 23:28, Shaw and Harper were passed by a SEAT Toledo towing the stolen quad bike on Admoor Lane, Bradfield Southend, and witnessed a person running towards and climbing into the passenger seat. Harper left the police vehicle and ran to the suspects in an attempt to catch the passenger before they could make a getaway. In doing so, he was caught in a strap (Note: The type of strap has been variously identified as either a crane strap, a ratchet strap, a "towing strap", or a tow rope.) that had been used to tow the quad bike. With the quad bike no longer attached, the suspects drove south-east on Lambden's Hill, dragging Harper behind the SEAT.

Shaw lost sight of the SEAT but in his pursuit came across Harper's stab vest in the road. The SEAT, with Harper still being dragged behind, arrived at a crossroads with the A4 Bath Road—approximately 1 mile (1.6 km) from where the police came upon the suspects. It crossed the A4 into Ufton Lane near Sulhamstead, and Harper became disentangled. At 23:30, Shaw received a radio transmission from another responding officer which warned of "a body in the road"; Shaw replied that he believed the body was that of Harper. Shaw arrived at the location to find another officer tending to Harper, who was pronounced dead by paramedics at 23:45.

A police helicopter using thermal imaging found the SEAT at Four Houses Corner, a travellers' caravan site, near Burghfield Common.

== Legal proceedings ==
=== Arrests ===
At 00:50 on 16 August, police arrested an 18-year-old male and a 17-year-old male at the caravan site. In a separate operation, a 20-year-old man from Pingewood was arrested on suspicion of murder. A second 17-year-old male was also later arrested. Media reported that in total 10 males aged between 13 and 30 had been arrested. On 19 August, the 20-year-old was charged with murder.

On 17 August, TVP's Major Crimes Unit stated that a post mortem performed the previous day gave Harper's cause of death as "multiple injuries", which was congruent with their theory that he had been "caught between a vehicle and the road, and then dragged for a distance". The post mortem also showed that Harper had sustained a "very severe" brain injury; a pathologist stated that it was likely Harper lost consciousness when he fell to the ground. Investigations showed that Harper was dragged 1 mile (1.6 km) in 91 seconds, with the defendants averaging 42.5 miles per hour (68.4 km/h).

On 18 September, 18-year-old Henry Long and 17-year-olds Albert Bowers and Jessie Cole were charged with murder. A fourth male, a 21-year-old from Basingstoke, was charged with conspiracy to steal a quad bike and subsequently pleaded guilty. On 19 September, the Crown Prosecution Service said that they had discontinued the case against a fifth defendant, a 20-year-old who had previously been charged with the murder.

=== Trial ===
The murder trial, presided over by Andrew Edis, began at the Old Bailey on 10 March 2020. Bowers and Cole—both minors at the time of the offence and originally protected by Section 39 of the Children and Young Persons Act 1933—pleaded guilty to conspiracy to steal a quad bike but denied manslaughter. Long, who was driving the SEAT, had previously admitted manslaughter and conspiracy to steal a quad bike. All three defendants denied murder.

On 13 March, the court heard that all parties agreed that the police constable first to attend to Harper on the A4 did not strike him with his vehicle, contrary to early reports of the incident.

The trial was temporarily suspended on 17 and 18 March as a member of the jury was unwell. The trial, which was being held during the COVID-19 pandemic, resumed on 19 March after two of the jurors were discharged because they were self-isolating. On 23 March, along with all other jury trials in England and Wales, the trial was suspended pending a review of operations amid the spread of COVID-19. During this subsequently abandoned trial, TVP said they had received intelligence suggesting possible jury intimidation.

A retrial began on 23 June following changes to the UK's COVID-19 lockdown. On 20 July, a juror was discharged after a prison officer reported that she had mouthed "bye boys" to the defendants in the courtroom. The following day, the 11-person jury retired to deliberate. On 24 July, the three defendants were cleared of murder. Long had pleaded guilty to, and Bowers and Cole were found guilty of, manslaughter. Harper's widow had made a victim impact statement and later released an open letter in which she implored Prime Minister Boris Johnson and Home Secretary Priti Patel to allow a retrial seeking a murder verdict.

On 31 July, Long was sentenced to 16 years and both Bowers and Cole to 13 years in prison. In his summary, on the matter as to whether the jury had been subject to any improper pressure, Edis said: "To the best of my knowledge and belief there is no truth in that at all". Harper's MP, John Howell, had said that he intended to ask for a review of the sentences.

=== Appeals ===
On 4 August, the Attorney General's Office said that it had received a request to review the sentences under the unduly lenient sentence scheme. On 19 August, Bowers and Cole made applications for permission to appeal against their convictions for manslaughter and against the sentences that they had received. On 21 August, the Attorney General applied for permission to refer the sentences to the Court of Appeal on the basis that they were "unduly lenient". On 28 August, Long applied for permission to appeal against his sentence on the basis that it was too severe.

The applications made by the defendants and by the Attorney General were heard by the Court of Appeal on 30 November. On 16 December the Court of Appeal dismissed (i) the Attorney General's application for permission to refer the sentences as unduly lenient, (ii) Long's application for permission to appeal against his sentence, and (iii) Bower and Cole's applications for permission to appeal against their convictions. The court granted permission for Bowers and Cole to appeal their sentences to enable the Court of Appeal to correct an error made in their sentencing for the offence of conspiracy to steal. Their sentences for manslaughter were not altered; as their sentences for conspiracy to steal and for manslaughter ran concurrently, their overall sentences were not affected.

=== Eligibility for release ===
The Sentencing Act 2026, effective from 2 September 2026, aims to reduce prison overcrowding by changing the automatic release dates of prisoners serving Standard Determinate Sentences. Under the act, those with a previous automatic release at two-thirds of their sentence would instead be released half-way through their sentence. In July 2026, the Ministry of Justice announced that Cole and Bowers (Note: Long, as the car driver, was not eligible for the early release as he received a "more severe type of extended sentence") may be eligible for release in 2027. This was met with criticism from Harper's family, TVP, and the Police Federation of England and Wales (PFEW). Prime minister Andy Burnham stated that the act would be paused pending a review, citing public safety.

Policy changes announced in August excluded prisoners convicted of rape, grooming, and serious child sex offences from the early release scheme; Cole and Bowers remained eligible. This received significant public opposition, and a petition against their early release gained more than one million signatories. Burnham tasked Alex Norris, the Secretary of State for Justice, with increasing prison capacity through additional means. (Note: Increasing the number of foreign offenders being returned to their country of origin; resolving the "long-running injustice" of IPP sentences to allow the release of lower-risk prisoners; and making more economical use of the prison estate) On 30 August, it was announced that those convicted of unlawful killing, including Cole and Bowers, would be excluded from the early release scheme.

== Legacy ==
Harper's funeral was held on 14 October 2019 at Christ Church Cathedral, Oxford. Members of the public lined the streets to watch the funeral procession, and over 800 people attended the service, including Home Secretary Priti Patel and Oxford West and Abingdon MP Layla Moran, both later paid respect to Harper in the House of Commons.

On 27 October 2019, 5,000 motorcyclists took part in a "ride of respect" between RAF Benson and Abingdon Airfield. On 28 January 2020, Harper was given a posthumous award by the PFEW. In June 2020, TVP named a new horse in their mounted section "Harper" as a tribute. In April 2026, the Police Memorial Trust unveiled a memorial to Harper at Forbury Gardens in Reading.

=== Harper's Law ===
In August 2020, Harper's widow Lissie launched a campaign for a new law which would require life imprisonment for criminals whose actions result in the death of any police officer, prison officer, firefighter, nurse, doctor, or paramedic. Separately, Harper's mother launched a campaign to require killers of police officers to receive minimum jail terms of 20 years.

On 24 November 2021, the Ministry of Justice announced that they would introduce "Harper's Law", giving mandatory life sentences to "anyone who commits the manslaughter of an emergency worker on duty, including police, prison officers, firefighters and paramedics, while carrying out another crime unless there are truly exceptional circumstances." The law was added to the statute book on 28 April 2022 as part of the Police, Crime, Sentencing and Courts Act 2022. The Home Secretary Priti Patel and the Justice Secretary Dominic Raab credited Lissie's campaign with convincing them to pass the law. Harper's Law was not applied retrospectively to his killers.

The law was met with some criticism. Richard Atkinson, former chairman of the Law Society's criminal law committee, pointed out that manslaughter already carries the maximum penalty of life, and making it mandatory takes "away the discretion of judges" and "is very worrying". Criminal barrister Matthew Scott said the maxim "hard cases make bad law" applies to this case.

== See also ==
- List of British police officers killed in the line of duty
