= Archie Sexton =

English boxer

Archibald Ernest Sexton GM (3 April 1908 – 11 July 1957) was an English professional boxer who began his career at featherweight in 1925 and finished as a middleweight in 1936. He had at least 222 professional contests, including one for the British middleweight title in 1933, where he lost by a tenth round technical knockout to Jock McAvoy.

== Biography ==
Sexton was born at Bethnal Green. He took part in the world's first televised boxing match, a six-round exhibition against Laurie Raiteri in London on 22 August 1933. The loss of the sight of his left eye – which occurred during a boxing match – forced him to retire from boxing in 1936, although he later worked as a BBBofC referee. During the Second World War he served as a Police War Reserve Constable, and in 1944 he was awarded the George Medal for his part in rescuing two men and a woman trapped in an air-raid shelter underneath Moorfields Eye Hospital in London.

He died in New Zealand on 11 July 1957 from a stroke, aged 49.

== Family ==
His son Dave had success in football, managing Chelsea and Manchester United. He also had another son Terence Sexton . His brother James, another professional boxer, fought under the alias Jim Blake. His great granddaughter through marriage is professional undefeated female boxer Ramla Ali
