= Death of Jack Avery =

Stabbing of British policeman in 1940

Jack Avery
- Born: Jack William Avery; 5 November 1911; Bromley, London, England
- Died: 6 July 1940 (aged 28); St. Mary's Hospital, London, England, U.K.
- Cause of death: stabbing
- Police career
- Department: Metropolitan Police Service
- Rank: Sergeant
- Badge no.: 890A

Sgt. Jack William Avery (5 November 1911 – 6 July 1940) was a British War Reserve Constable who was murdered in Hyde Park, London, having served less than one year with the Metropolitan Police Service.

On 5 July, Sgt. Avery was advised by a member of the public that Frank Stephen Cobbett was acting suspiciously. Avery approached Cobbett, who was lying on the grass and writing on a piece of paper, and took the paper from him. Avery returned the paper to Cobbett, who stabbed the officer in the groin or upper thigh with a carving knife. Avery died the next day.

Cobbett, a 42-year-old homeless labourer, was originally sentenced to death by Mr. Justice Atkinson, even though the jury strongly recommended mercy because of his "low mentality." After an appeal, Cobbett served 15 years' penal servitude for manslaughter instead.

In 2007, Ian Blair, then Metropolitan Police Commissioner, unveiled a memorial to Avery in Hyde Park, close to the place where he was attacked.

== See also ==
- List of British police officers killed in the line of duty
