= Police Roll of Honour Trust =

UK charitable organisation

Trust Crown Badge

The Police Roll of Honour Trust is a charitable organisation registered in England & Wales and Scotland.

The charity was founded in 2000, and records all British police officers and PCSOs who have died on or in the line of duty. It has been granted a Royal Charter.

== Royal charter ==
In November 2016, Her Majesty's Most Honourable Privy Council considered the petition of the Police Roll of Honour Trust to be granted incorporation by royal charter; in March 2018 the royal charter was approved by Queen Elizabeth II and it was presented to the charity by the former Commissioner of Police of the Metropolis, Lord Hogan-Howe.

The trust worked with the College of Arms to create their crown badge that was approved by Queen Elizabeth II in 2009.

== Police Roll of Honour ==
The Police Roll of Honour Trust researches and maintains the UK Police Roll of Honour and has provided this for various other organisations. The complete UK Police Roll of Honour is displayed at the National Police Memorial, it is laid out by day and lists all those Police Officers who have died on that day throughout history. There are roughly 4,000 names contained within the UK Police Roll of Honour, but ongoing research is slowly adding to that total.

== Patrons ==
There are four patrons, they are Dame Cressida Dick, Iain Livingstone, Martin Hewitt, and Matt Jukes.

== Cyprus Police Memorial ==
During the Cyprus Emergency there were a number of British police officers sent to Cyprus to help the local police. British soldiers and police became embroiled and were seen as legitimate targets of the EOKA group. Eight United Kingdom Police Unit officers were killed at the hands of terrorists, and three more died due to other causes. In 2014, the Police Roll of Honour Trust unveiled a new Cyprus Police Memorial.

== See also ==
- Police Memorial Trust
- List of British police officers killed in the line of duty
