= Murder of Raymond Codling =

1989 shooting of a police inspector in Greater Manchester

Inspector Raymond Codling
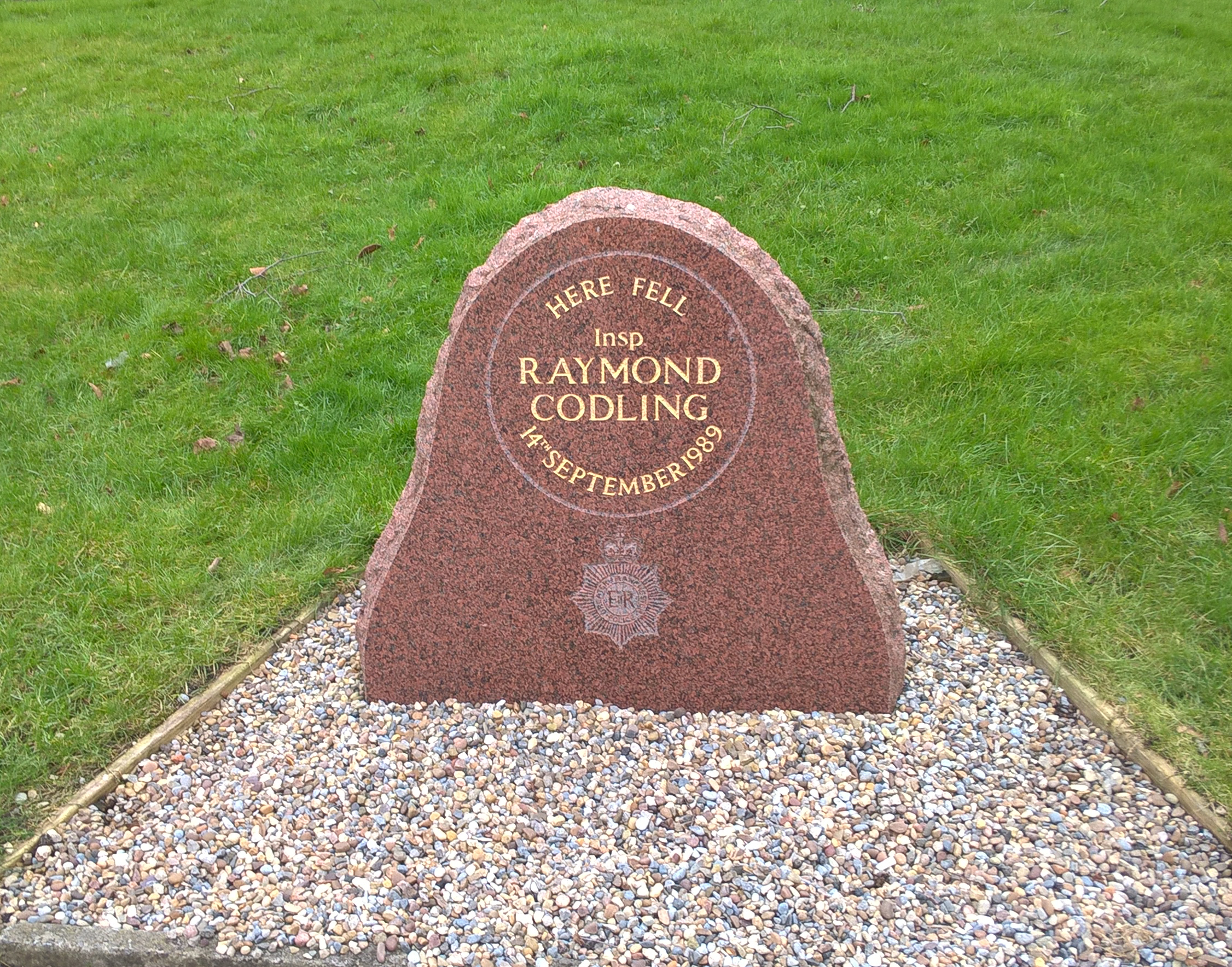
- Memorial stone dedicated to Codling at Birch Services
- Born: 5 January 1940
- Died: 14 September 1989 (aged 49); Birch Services, M62, Heywood, Greater Manchester
- Police career
- Department: Greater Manchester Police
- Rank: Inspector

Raymond Anthony Codling was an inspector with Greater Manchester Police who was murdered at Birch Services on the M62 motorway near Heywood, Greater Manchester, in 1989.

== Career and murder ==
Raymond Codling was born on 5 January 1940 in Richmond, North Yorkshire. He served in the Royal Navy, resigning with the rank of Petty Officer, and joined the Metropolitan Police. In the 1970s, he transferred to Greater Manchester Police.

On 14 September 1989, Codling, aged 49, together with Sergeant James Bowden, 45, stopped at Birch motorway services on the M62, looking for a white van. They approached a motorcyclist, later identified as Anthony Hughes, who produced a pistol and began firing at the officers. A shot aimed at Sergeant Bowden caused no injury, but two subsequent shots hit and killed Inspector Codling.

A manhunt for Hughes, who had previous convictions for serious offences including robbery and rape, ended at a garage in Kendray, South Yorkshire, where Hughes had killed himself.

In 1991, a memorial to Codling was unveiled at the place of his death by Michael Winner, founder of the Police Memorial Trust, and the Home Secretary, Kenneth Baker. In February 2010, the Bishop of Manchester, The Right Reverend Nigel McCulloch, met Codling's widow at a memorial service at the Birch Services.

== See also ==
- List of British police officers killed in the line of duty
