= Death of Phillip Walters =

1995 shooting of a police officer in Ilford, England

Phillip Walters
- Born: c. 1967/68
- Died: 18 April 1995 (aged 27–28); Ilford, east London
- Police career
- Department: Metropolitan Police Service
- Service years: September 1993 – April 1995
- Rank: Police Constable

PC Phillip John Walters was a police officer in London's Metropolitan Police Service who was shot dead while investigating a domestic disturbance in Ilford, east London on 18 April 1995.

== Background ==
Born in Royston, Hertfordshire. After working as an air steward, Walters joined the Metropolitan Police Service in September 1993 and was posted to Ilford in February 1994.

== Death ==
On 18 April 1995, Walters responded to reports of a domestic disturbance at a flat in Empress Avenue, Ilford, with his colleague Police Constable Derek Shepherd, whom he had partnered in the job for the eighteen months since he entered service. Upon arrival, the pair discovered three men beating the male occupant of the property; it later transpired that they had been hired to beat the man who was the former boyfriend of a woman. As the suspects attempted to escape, one produced a Smith & Wesson handgun and shot Walters in the chest as he was tackled by the officer. The bullet penetrated Walters' heart and he died later in hospital. A second shot grazed Shepherd's shoulder. Shepherd only managed to save himself by jamming his finger in front of the gun's hammer.

== Aftermath ==
A 28-year-old man, thought to be a Jamaican illegal immigrant and named only as 'Ray Lee' (one of three aliases he used on his fake passports) was convicted of Walters' manslaughter at the Old Bailey in a second trial in June 1996 (an original trial collapsed when the jury became irrevocably split). Judge Ann Goddard sentenced 'Lee' to ten years imprisonment for the manslaughter of Walters (the maximum sentence which could have been imposed is 25 years) and an additional eight years for firearms offences, robbery and grievous bodily harm in the incident which led the officers to the Ilford flat. In a separate trial, the two other men who escaped the scene, and a woman, were convicted of lesser charges.

Walters' colleague Derek Shepherd returned to service ten months after the shooting, having suffered from stress, contributing to the breakdown of his marriage. Walters' girlfriend of four years at the time of his death emigrated to the United States and later married.

In 1997, the Police Memorial Trust erected a stone memorial dedicated to Walters near the place of his death in Empress Avenue, Ilford.

'Ray Lee' was released in 2007 having served 12 years of his 18-year sentence. He was reported to have been deported to Jamaica.

== See also ==
- List of British police officers killed in the line of duty
