= War reserve constable =

This should not be confused with a Special Constable, which was a voluntary British police officer, that existed alongside the War Reserve Constable.

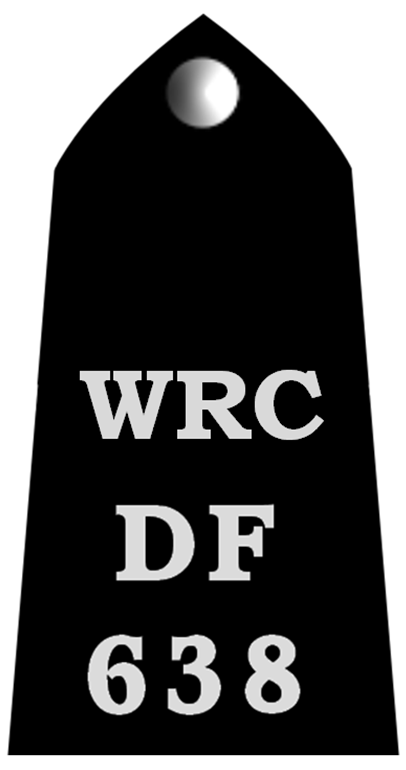
Example of a WRC uniform epaulette

War reserve constable (or WRC, war reserve police constable, WRPC) was a voluntary role within the ranks of the British police forces. As suggested by the title, the role was as a voluntary police constable during the war. War reserve constables were sworn in under the Special Constables Act 1923, and had the full powers of a police officer.

== History ==
The War Reserve Police was introduced in 1939 and at the height of World War II in 1944 there were 17,000 war reserve constables. The rank was dissolved on 31 December 1948, causing 686 officers to be discharged from service, and the remainder being recruited for service as a regular or special constable.

Most officers were aged between 25–55 and undertook twelve hours of unpaid annual training.

Despite British police traditionally being unarmed, officers were armed with Canadian Ross rifles during wartime for protection from enemy action, enemy sabotage and to assist with the armed forces.

Duties of a WRC included the usual activities of a constable, as well as:

- enforcing blackouts,
- combating black market activity,
- assisting in evacuations and air raids
- and capturing deserting soldiers.

Regular police officers were supported by 39,500 male auxiliary officers on full-time service (War Reserve Constables) as well as thousands of Special Constables.

== Uniform and equipment ==
Uniform and equipment was the same as a regular constable, with the exception of uniform epaulettes which were detailed WRC above the collar number and divisional sign. During the war officers wore named Brodie helmets, with "W. R. Police" or "POLICE" marked on the front, instead of traditional police headgear. However, peaked caps were sometimes worn.

The traditional police whistle was worn, as well as the police duty cuff-band.

== Notable war reserve constables ==
- Jack Avery, a war reserve constable who was stabbed to death in Hyde Park in 1940. There is a plaque near this place to commemorate him.
- John Christie was accepted as a WRC after authorities failed to check his background (he had an extensive criminal record). He later went on to be a notorious serial killer in London, and was hanged in 1953 for his crimes. However this was after Timothy Evans was hanged for two of the murders, a major miscarriage of justice.
- Archie Sexton, a professional boxer who was awarded the George Medal for his services in the War Reserve.
- Arthur Bacon, ex-professional footballer, was killed in an air raid on Derby on 27 July 1942 while serving as a War Reserve Officer. He is commemorated at Chesterfield FC, and had also played for Derby, Manchester City, Reading and Coventry.

== War reserve officers killed in the line of duty ==
Sometimes War Reserve Constables were killed off duty but their deaths were related to their police work (for example, eight died whilst off duty at Kilburn Section House when it was hit by a bomb). Numerous War Reserve Constables were killed in the line of duty during World War Two including those listed below.

=== Assaults ===
- Metropolitan Police: Jack William Avery (stabbed by a suspect)
- John Towers, aged 39, Blackburn Borough Police (assault by a man he had reprimanded)
- Joseph Pickering, aged 54, Lancashire Constabulary (assaulted as he tried to arrest a man)

=== By enemy action during air raids ===
- Metropolitan Police: Charles Huck (injuries whilst investigating a fire); Albin Keller and Ernest Hunt (separately killed by flying bombs); Thomas Killeen (alongside five regular police colleagues when Holloway Police Station was bombed); Coronation Elmer (from injuries sustained in Soho)
- Birmingham City Police: Harold Kavanagh (Acocks Green); William Hodgetts
- Frederick Smith City of London Police
- Frederick Strong Coventry City Police (city centre)
- Henry Kettle Kent County Constabulary (at Hawkinge)
- Richard Millington Liverpool City Police (by falling masonry)
- Herbert Symes Southampton Borough Police (whilst guarding electricity sub-station)

=== In bomb explosions ===
- Metropolitan Police: Charles Scutt (whilst on patrol); Arthur Gurr Thorburn (delayed action bomb whilst guarding a bomb site); Gordon Farrant and Arthur Stead (together on the roof of the Houses of Parliament); Frederick Broadhurst, Ben Parker, Lewis Morgan (all separate explosions). Reginald Block (at a power station); Alexander Bruce and Thomas Cockburn (together in Ruislip); Simeon Glen and Arthur Myers (together in Hammersmith); Alexander Levy and George Tree (together in Stepney); Alfred Knapp (alongside 2 regular police colleagues); Thomas Pickett, Leslie Brown, Lewis Morgan, Arthur White, George Gray, Francis Taylor, Thomas Jones, Joseph Ward, Leslie Craydon (all separate explosions); Charles Wilding (from injuries sustained).
- Franklyn Wilkinson Salford City Police

=== Other ===
- Metropolitan Police: Ernest Taylor (fell whilst attempting to extinguish a light); Albert Hinds and Frederick Browne (separately killed by anti-aircraft shells); William Collier and Charles Squires (killed together by a landmine); Harold Lambert (shell explosion); Israel Abrahams (struck by a tram whilst on his beat during blackout)
- John Gillings Warwickshire Constabulary (struck by a car at a traffic check during an air raid)
- Arthur Wilton West Sussex Constabulary (struck by a bus whilst on cycle patrol during blackout)

== Women's Auxiliary Police Corps (WAPC) ==
The WAPC was set up in 1939 and was similar to the WRC, except only some of its members were attested as constables. At most, there were 5,000 full-time WAPCs, including 500 attested WAPC constables. This was the first step towards allowing women to join the UK's special constabularies, which they had still been unable to do in 1939.

== See also ==
- Air raid wardens
- Home Guard
