= Death of Ged Walker =

British police officer

Ged Walker
- Born: Gerald Michael Walker; 15 January 1960; Ollerton, England
- Died: 9 January 2003 (aged 42); Bulwell, Nottingham, England
- Other name: Ged
- Police career
- Department: Nottinghamshire Police
- Rank: Police Constable

PC Gerald Michael "Ged" Walker (15 January 1960 – 9 January 2003) was an English police dog handler with Nottinghamshire Police who was killed in the line of duty in Bulwell, Nottingham, in 2003.

On 7 January 2003, PC Walker was dragged 100 yards (roughly 90 m) and fatally injured by a stolen taxi as he reached into the vehicle in an attempt to remove the keys from the ignition. He died in hospital two days later from serious head injuries. He was survived by his widow and two children.

In December 2003, 26-year-old drug addict David Parfitt was convicted of Walker's manslaughter and sentenced to 13 years in prison. He had been on licence at the time of the incident for a previous robbery offence.

In September 2005, a memorial stone for PC Walker was unveiled at the junction of St. Albans Road and Cantrell Road in Bulwell, close to the location of the fatal incident. Present at the unveiling were Michael Winner, the founder and chairman of the Police Memorial Trust, Walker's widow, and the chief constable of Nottinghamshire Police.

A dog show has been held annually in Long Eaton in memory of Walker since his death in 2003. The police station in Bulwell where he was stationed has been named the Ged Walker Building.

== See also ==
- List of British police officers killed in the line of duty
