= List of British police officers killed in the line of duty =

This list includes only those serving police officers who were killed as a direct result of a crime or while attempting to respond to, prevent, stop or solve a specific criminal act or incident. The list omits war-time deaths by enemy fire, such as the many police officers killed by air raids during the Second World War including 100 killed in the Metropolitan Police area. The list also omits the more than 300 officers of the former Royal Ulster Constabulary (RUC) killed in paramilitary assassinations or attacks during The Troubles.

== Key ==
Rank abbreviations

- A/x = Acting
- ACC = Assistant chief constable
- CC = Chief constable
- Cmdr = Commander
- DC = Detective constable
- DS = Detective sergeant
- Insp = Inspector
- PC = Police constable
- SPC = Special police constable
- Supt = Superintendent
- WPC = Woman police constable
- WRC = War reserve constable

== List ==
Name	Rank	Age	Force	Date of death	Circumstances
Desmond Acreman	PC	33	Metropolitan Police	12 February 1967	Accidentally run over while pursuing suspected thieves in Woolwich. (Note: Acreman was injured in the accident on 11 February but died the following day)
Ronald Addison	PC	24	Metropolitan Police	24 January 1960	Collapsed and died of heart failure while pursuing suspects
Raja Ahmed	PC	35	Greater Manchester Police	31 August 1999	Motorcycle rammed into oncoming traffic by suspect
Jane Arbuthnot	WPC	22	Metropolitan Police	17 December 1983	Killed in the Harrods bombing
Alison Armitage	PC	29	Greater Manchester Police	5 March 2001	Run over by suspect
Jack Avery	WRC	28	Metropolitan Police	6 July 1940	Stabbed by a suspect he was interrogating in Hyde Park
Edward Barnett	PC	24	City of Glasgow Police	4 January 1970	Shot during the Linwood bank robbery.
Clive Barratt	DC	35	Suffolk Constabulary	28 July 1999	Motorcycle accident while on surveillance duty
Andrew Barton	Sergeant	40	Northumbria Police	15 April 1913	Shot (Note: Barton was shot at the Sun Inn, Bedlington, trying to evict the landlord; Constable Russell and the Sarah Grice the new manager's wife were also killed)
Douglas Beckerson	PC	22	Metropolitan Police	10 April 1971	Fell through a roof while pursuing suspect
Kevin Biglin	PC	41	Suffolk Constabulary	03 December 2004	Died of heart failure after becoming unwell during officer safety training.
Matthew Blades	PC	37	Cleveland Police	22 August 2026	Crash with a non-police vehicle on the A66 road
Robert Bentley	Sergeant	36	City of London Police	17 December 1910	Shot during the Houndsditch murders
Sharon Beshenivsky	PC	38	West Yorkshire Police	18 November 2005	Shot while responding to an armed robbery
Thomas Biddlecombe	PC	47	Dorset Constabulary (now Dorset Police)	18 December 1916	Whilst patrolling Thornford Road, Sherborne, he took severely ill and was taken by ambulance to Yeatman Hospital where he died.
Walter Billett	WRC	61	Dorset Constabulary (now Dorset Police)	5 July 1940	Killed in a fall from his bicycle while reporting for duty in the blackout.
Brian Bishop	Acting sergeant	37	Essex Police	27 August 1984	Shot
Thomas Bishop	PC	39	Dorset Constabulary (now Dorset Police)	21 September 1877	Fatally bludgeoned with stones by a drunken man he had warned. The incident occurred in Bere Regis following the Woodbury Hill Fair.
Keith Blakelock	PC	40	Metropolitan Police	6 October 1985	Stabbed in the Broadwater Farm riot
Fiona Bone	PC	32	Greater Manchester Police	18 September 2012	Killed in gun and grenade ambush alongside PC Nicola Hughes
Roger Brereton	PC	41	Thames Valley Police	19 August 1987	Shot in the Hungerford massacre
Ian Broadhurst	PC	34	West Yorkshire Police	26 December 2003	Shot during the Leeds police shootings
Laurence Brown	PC	27	Metropolitan Police	28 August 1990	Shot
Gareth Browning	PC	36	Thames Valley Police	1 April 2017	Struck by suspect vehicle while deploying a stinger in 2013
Cecil Budden	PC	27	Dorset Constabulary (now Dorset Police)	19 May 1957	Fatally injured in a collision with a car while on motorcycle patrol.
Dugald Campbell	Watchman	unknown	Edinburgh City Police	3 January 1812	Killed whilst attempting to stop a robbery during the Tron riot.
Gavin Carlton	PC	29	West Midlands Police	19 December 1988	Shot while attempting to arrest armed bank robbers
Joseph Carroll	PC	46	Northumbria Police	13 April 2006	Traffic collision while transporting a prisoner
Stephen Carroll	PC	48	Police Service of Northern Ireland	9 March 2009	Shot by Republican terrorists whilst responding to 999 call.
Adele Cashman	DC	30	Metropolitan Police	5 November 2012	Collapsed while pursuing robbery suspects
Walter Choat	PC	34	City of London Police	17 December 1910	Shot during the Houndsditch murders
Duncan Clift	PC	27	Kent Police	22 March 1991	Killed off duty while trying to arrest car thief.
Tom Clough	PC	38	Cleveland Police	22 August 2026	Crash with a non-police vehicle on the A66 road
Raymond Codling	Inspector	49	Greater Manchester Police	14 September 1989	Shot
Glenn Corder	PC	18	Durham Constabulary	6 February 1980	Vehicle crashed during police pursuit
Bradley Corke	PC	27	Kent Police	21 March 2026	Involved in fatal collision whereby he and his partner were struck by another vehicle while responding to an emergency.
Ian Coward	DC	28	Thames Valley Police	23 July 1971	Shot whilst on duty.
Raymond Davenport	PC	42	Merseyside Police	4 July 1981	Killed whilst attempting to stop a stolen vehicle
Brian Dawson	Sergeant	42	Leicestershire Police	1 September 1975	Shot during a siege in West Knighton, near Leicester. Two others were also shot dead, with the gunman later being imprisoned on charges of manslaughter.
Ian Dibell	PC	41	Essex Police	9 July 2012	Shot while off duty and confronting an armed man
Edward Dorney	PC	24	Metropolitan Police	1 January 1960	Killed along with Police Dog Gus when hit by a train whilst pursuing burglary suspects.
Nicholas Dumphreys	PC	47	Cumbria Police	26 January 2020	Car accident caused by known fault within the N57 engine in the BMW police vehicle he was driving whilst responding to emergency call.
Andrew Duncan	PC	47	Metropolitan Police	22 September 2013	Fatally injured when struck by vehicle he attempted to stop while carrying out speed enforcement.
Patrick Dunne	PC	44	Metropolitan Police	20 October 1993	Fatally shot while attending domestic dispute
Sandra Edwards	WPC	28	South Yorkshire Police	10 May 1995	Died two days after sustaining fatal injuries when her police vehicle crashed while in pursuit of a stolen car.
Richard Ellerker	PC	42	North Yorkshire Police	26 December 1993	Collapsed and died shortly after arresting a violent, drunk suspect
Peter Evans	PC	33	Suffolk Constabulary	24 February 2001	Killed while travelling in an Armed Response Vehicle, which was returning to base at the end of a shift in the early hours. It left the road overturned and hit an electricity pole near Bury St Edmunds.
Dave Fields	PC	45	South Yorkshire Police	25 December 2017	Fatally injured in a road traffic accident when his vehicle aquaplaned while responding to an emergency incident.
Yvonne Fletcher	WPC	25	Metropolitan Police	17 April 1984	Shot
John Fordham	DC	45	Metropolitan Police	26 January 1985	Stabbed during surveillance relating to the Brink's-Mat robbery.
William Forth	Sergeant	34	Northumbria Police	21 March 1993	Beaten and stabbed to death after answering a 999 call.
Geoffrey Fox	PC	41	Metropolitan Police	12 August 1966	Shot in the Shepherd's Bush Murders, alongside Christopher Head and David Wombwell
Lewis Fulton	PC	28	Strathclyde Police	17 June 1994	Stabbed (Note: Fulton was stabbed after arriving at a disturbance involving an 18-year old youth in the Gorbals area of Glasgow, Fulton died in Glasgow Victoria Infirmary undergoing surgery.)
Glenn Goodman	SPC	37	North Yorkshire Police	7 June 1992	Shot by IRA member Paul Magee during routine traffic stop
Kevin Gorman	PC	24	Police Service of Northern Ireland	23 November 2008	Car accident whilst responding to emergency call.
Harold Grainger	PC	35	South Yorkshire Police	26 October 1974	Killed in a police vehicle accident while escorting a prisoner.
Richard Gray	PC	43	West Mercia Constabulary	6 May 2007	Shot
Thomas Green	Sergeant	51	Surrey Police	18 February 1919	Died following a blow to the head with an iron bar during the Epsom riot.
Declan Greene	PC	39	Police Service of Northern Ireland	23 November 2008	Car accident whilst responding to emergency call.
Peter Guthrie	PC	21	West Midlands Police	22 July 1972	Shot
George Gutteridge	PC	31	Essex Police	27 September 1927	Shot.
David Haigh	PC	25	North Yorkshire Police	17 June 1982	Shot by Barry Prudom
Andrew Harper	PC	28	Thames Valley Police	15 August 2019	Dragged by vehicle while investigating a burglary report
Christopher Hart	PC	40	Greater Manchester Police	12 January 2008	Killed in a collision between a car and his police van whilst responding to an emergency incident.
Alfred Head	PC	46	Dorset Constabulary (now Dorset Police)	19 October 1938	Fatally injured in a road collision cycling to court in bad weather.
Christopher Head	DS	30	Metropolitan Police	12 August 1966	Shot in the Shepherd's Bush Murders alongside Geoffrey Fox and David Wombwell
Jonathan Henry	PC	36	Bedfordshire Police	11 June 2007	Stabbed responding to 999 call
Glen Howe	PC	48	South Yorkshire Police	24 October 2008	Fatally injured in a road traffic accident while responding to an emergency incident.
Nicola Hughes	PC	23	Greater Manchester Police	18 September 2012	Killed in gun and grenade ambush alongside PC Fiona Bone.
Kenneth Innell	Inspector	44	Dorset Police	13 December 1982	Collapsed and died during an incident on duty at Poole Quay.
Kenneth Irvine	PC	30	Police Service of Northern Ireland	23 November 2008	Car accident whilst responding to emergency call.
Thomas Jackson	PC	46	South Yorkshire Police	13 December 2003	Collapsed and died while dispersing rival football crowds with his police dog.
Andrew James	PC	38	South Wales Police	2 August 2003	Accidentally run over while pursuing suspect (Note: James was chasing a teenager in Cardiff following a break-in at Royal Welsh College of Music and Drama, he was struck by a passing car and died later at the University Hospital of Wales.)
Ieuan Jeffreys	PC	31	Merseyside Police	4 May 1941	Killed investigating an unexploded bomb on aiding duty in Liverpool.
Karpal Kaur Sandhu	PC	30	Metropolitan Police	4 November 1973	Fatally injured during an arrest
Desmond Kellam	PC	31	Wiltshire Constabulary	3 October 1979	Fatally injured during an arrest
Ronan Kerr	PC	25	Police Service of Northern Ireland	2 April 2011	Killed by a Republican terrorist car bomb outside his home.
John Kew	PC	29	West Riding of Yorkshire Constabulary	11 July 1900	Shot (Note: Kew was shot with a revolver in Swinton near Rotherham, while searching a suspect, he died a few hours later at Rotherham Hospital)
Robert Kidd	DS	37	London & North Western Railway Police	29 September 1895	Fatally injured during an arrest
Alan King	Sergeant	41	Metropolitan Police	29 November 1991	Stabbed while questioning a male suspected of handling stolen goods
Matt Lannie	PC	40	South Yorkshire Police	21 April 2020	Fatally injured in a motorcycle accident while responding to an incident.
Michael Last	DC	32	Suffolk Constabulary	23 September 1987	Killed in a road accident, alongside DC Terence George Glister of Norfolk Constabulary, while on Regional Crime Squad duty.
Alan Leggatt	PC	42	Suffolk Constabulary	05 February 1969	Fatally injured when he collided with a horse while on motorcycle patrol.
Cheryl Lloyd	PC	42	Suffolk Constabulary	18 June 2005	Killed when the patrol car she was driving collided with a stationary lorry as she responded to an urgent call in Ipswich.
Sidney Loader	PC	40	Dorset Constabulary (now Dorset Police)	8 September 1938	Fatally injured in a collision with a car while on cycle patrol.
Nina MacKay	WPC	25	Metropolitan Police	24 October 1997	Stabbed
Angus MacKenzie	A/DC	31	City of Glasgow Police	30 December 1969	Shot during the Linwood bank robbery
James Magee	PC	27	Police Service of Northern Ireland	23 November 2008	Car accident while responding to emergency call.
Stanley Marsh	PC	24	Dorset Constabulary (now Dorset Police)	9 February 1939	Died as a result of injuries received in 1938 when he attempted to stop a car.
Robert Marshall	PC	46	Suffolk Constabulary	04 March 1985	Fatally injured in a road accident while riding a motorcycle on patrol.
Francis Mason	PC	27	Hertfordshire Constabulary	14 April 1988	Shot while off-duty, attempting to prevent an armed robbery. Posthumously awarded the Queen's Gallantry Medal.
John Masterson	Sergeant	46	Suffolk Constabulary	26 June 1992	Collapsed and died while on motorcycle escort duty during a royal visit.
Ronan McCloskey	PC	25	Metropolitan Police	9 May 1987	Struck by motor vehicle by suspected drink driver trying to escape.
Christopher McDonald	PC	19	Nottinghamshire Police	17 May 1978	Beaten
Sidney Miles	PC	42	Metropolitan Police	2 November 1952	Shot whilst responding to a burglary
Hugh Moore	Cmdr	64	City of London Police	4 December 1993	Admitted to hospital 11 days after an arrest, died from heart failure four days later
Jim Morrison	DC	26	Metropolitan Police	13 December 1991	Stabbed while off-duty, attempting to arrest a thief.
Andrew Munn	PC	37	Leicestershire Constabulary	15 August 2002	Rammed by vehicle being pursued. Same incident as PC Bryan Moore.
Bryan Moore	PC	39	Leicestershire Constabulary	15 August 2002	Rammed by vehicle being pursued. Same incident as PC Andrew Munn.
George Mussell	PC	40	Northumberland County Constabulary	15 April 1913	Shot (Note: Mussell was shot at the Sun Inn, Bedlington trying to evict the landlord, Sergeant Barton and Sarah Grice, the new manager's wife were also killed)
Faizaan Najeeb	PC	24	Northamptonshire Police	26 September 2025	Struck by a vehicle while on scene at an unrelated single-vehicle collision.
Alexander Negus	PC	21	Suffolk Constabulary	27 December 1983	Killed when he was struck by a passing vehicle while going to rescue a dog involved in a road accident.
Stephen Oake	DC	40	Greater Manchester Police	14 January 2003	Stabbed
Jon Odell	PC	30	Kent Police	19 December 2000	While conducting speed checks was intentionally run over by disqualified driver.
Frank Joseph O'Neill	PC	31	Metropolitan Police	25 October 1980	Stabbed while trying to apprehend a suspect. Posthumously awarded the Queen's Gallantry Medal.
Keith Palmer	PC	48	Metropolitan Police	22 March 2017	Stabbed during Westminster terrorist attack
Mat Parker	PC	43	Essex Police	19 November 2025	Involved in a single vehicle collision on a motorcycle while responding to an emergency
David Phillips	PC	34	Merseyside Police	5 October 2015	Run over whilst attempting to deploy a Stop Stick device in a pursuit
Harry Pickett	PC	51	Metropolitan Police	15 May 1943	Killed when struck by a passing lorry while questioning a suspect
Jim Porter	DC	31	Durham Constabulary	4 March 1982	Shot in pursuit of armed robbers.
Phillip Pratt	PC	26	Kent Police	14 June 2009	Hit by a vehicle whilst managing the scene of an RTC.
Matt Ratana	Sergeant	54	Metropolitan Police	25 September 2020	Shot and kill by a prisoner with a concealed pistol at Croydon custody centre
Mandy Rayner	WPC	18	Hertfordshire Constabulary	13 October 1982	Vehicle struck during police pursuit. She was the first British woman police officer to be killed in service.
Phillipa Reynolds	PC	27	Police Service of Northern Ireland	9 February 2013	Killed when a stolen car hit her police car.
Gerry Richardson	Supt	38	Lancashire Constabulary	23 August 1971	Shot
Derek Robertson	Sergeant	39	Metropolitan Police	9 February 1994	Stabbed during post office robbery.
Gina Rutherford	WPC	25	South Yorkshire Police	7 February 1994	Drowned when her police car skidded off an icy road and plunged upside down into a river.
Barry Saunders	PC	31	South Yorkshire Police	24 November 1989	Killed when he fell thirty feet through a sky-light while checking the roof of burgled factory premises.
Graham Saville	Sergeant	46	Nottinghamshire Police	29 August 2023	Fatally injured when struck by a train, while trying to reach a distressed man on the track. (Note: Saville was struck on 24 August but died in hospital five days later)
Kulwant Sidhu	PC	24	Metropolitan Police	24 October 1999	Died after plunging through a glass panel on the roof of an industrial building, while chasing two suspected burglars.
Dennis Smith	PC	44	Devon and Cornwall Police	21 December 1973	Shot after high speed pursuit
George Snipe	PC	29	Birmingham City Police	19 July 1897	PC Snipe was attempting an arrest at the Star Public House in Hockley, when a mob turned upon him and his colleague PC Mead. They attempted to find shelter in the local church, but a brick thrown at them hit him on the head, he died in hospital 4 hours later.
Henry Solomon	CC	49	Brighton Borough Police	14 March 1844	Bludgeoned with a poker whilst interviewing a prisoner for the theft of a roll of carpet
Ernest Southern	PC	35	Lancashire Constabulary	27 January 1962	Collapsed attending a violent street affray. (Note: Southern collapsed outside a hotel in Kirby near Liverpool while dealing with a disturbance, he later died in hospital from cerebral haemorrhage)
John Speed	Sergeant	39	West Yorkshire Police	31 October 1984	Shot while going to aid of a colleague who had been fired on, near Leeds Parish Church.
Neville Stackwood	PC	27	Suffolk Constabulary	09 May 1984	Found dead alongside his crashed motorcycle while he was on patrol.
Michael Swindells	DC	44	West Midlands Police	21 May 2004	Stabbed
Barry Taylor	Inspector	30	West Yorkshire Police	15 February 1970	Shot while responding to a burglary.
John Taylor	PC	26	Staffordshire Police	23 November 1986	Pushed off the 7th floor of a block of flats while arresting burglars.
Robert Thomson	ACC	38	Edinburgh City Police	16 July 1940	Shot
Stephen Tibble	PC	21	Metropolitan Police	26 February 1975	Shot while assisting colleague when off-duty (Note: Tibble stopped his motorcycle on Charleville Road, London, and attempted to stop a man who was running away from two plain clothes policemen, the man fired at Tibble and ran on. Tibble was wounded twice in the chest and died later at New Charing Cross Hospital)
Gary Toms	PC	37	Metropolitan Police	11 April 2009	Thrown from police vehicle during pursuit
Jeffrey Tooley	PC	26	Sussex Police	24 April 1999	Killed by hit-and-run whilst carrying out roadside speed enforcement.
Ian Toomer	Inspector	50	Dorset Police	20 April 1999	Killed in a road collision when his police car crashed in wet weather.
Charles Tucker	Sergeant	46	City of London Police	16 December 1910	Shot during the Houndsditch murders
Jessica Turnbull	PC	19	Northumbria Police	10 June 2026	Died after being hit by a car while responding to another road collision. (Note: Turnbull was attending an incident on 8 June when she was struck by another car, she died in hospital on 10 June)
William Tyler	PC	31	Metropolitan Police	29 January 1909	Shot during the Tottenham Outrage
Wilfred Viney	PC	31	Dorset Constabulary (now Dorset Police)	25 July 1930	Killed riding pillion in a motorcycle collision on plain clothes night patrol.
Ged Walker	PC	42	Nottinghamshire Police	9 January 2003	Run over
Arthur Walls	Inspector	44	Eastbourne Borough Police	9 October 1912	Shot
Phillip Walters	PC	28	Metropolitan Police	18 April 1995	Shot
Stephen Wilson	PC	37	Dorset Police	16 May 1996	Fatally injured in a motorcycle collision while reporting for night duty.
David Winter	Sergeant	31	North Yorkshire Police	28 June 1982	Shot by Barry Prudom
David Wombwell	DC	25	Metropolitan Police	12 August 1966	Shot during the Shepherd's Bush Murders alongside Geoffrey Fox and Christopher Head
Sidney Wood	PC	27	Dorset Constabulary (now Dorset Police)	26 April 1908	Died after crashing his bicycle on a steep hill searching for a thief
Ian Woodward	PC	33	Lancashire Police	25 February 1987	Shot after challenging poacher off-duty.
Ross Hunt	DS	56	South Lanarkshire	5 June 1983	While attempting to catch a knife criminal was attacked by three members of the same family, beaten and stabbed to death.
James Wright	PC	38	Manchester City Police	20 June 1934	Run over (Note: Knocked down by a motorcar while on point duty on 15 June 1934, died later at Manchester Royal Infirmary)
Joseph Grantham	PC	31	Metropolitan Police	28 June 1830	First Met police officer to die while on duty. Two police coroners ruled he died from a stroke during a struggle - a ruling with which a trial jury concurred

== See also ==
- List of killings by law enforcement officers in the United Kingdom
- List of American police officers killed in the line of duty
- List of Irish police officers killed in the line of duty
- Police Roll of Honour Trust
- List of People's Armed Police personnel killed in the line of duty
- National Police Memorial (London)
