= Elizabeth Emblem =

Recognition for next of kin of deceased UK emergency service workers

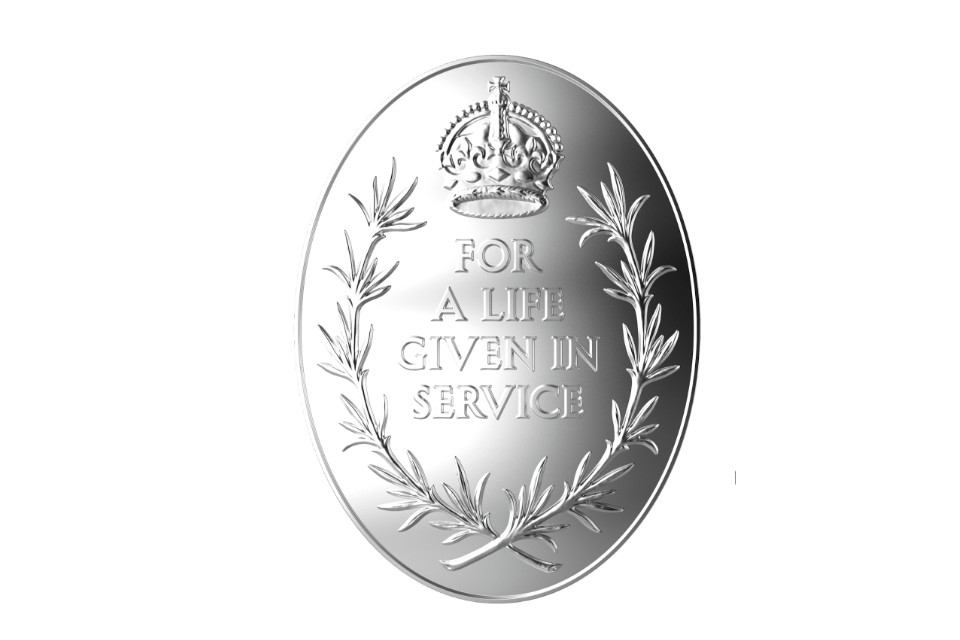
- Awarded for: Awarded to the next of kin of emergency service personnel who were killed on duty
- Country: United Kingdom
- Presented by: King Charles III, or representative.
- Eligibility: Members of the United Kingdom emergency services who are killed on duty
- Obverse: The words for a life given in service are inscribed surmounted by a Tudor crown and surrounded by a wreath
- Status: Currently awarded
- Established: 9 March 2024; 2 years ago
- First award: 10 December 2024

Highlights
- Total awarded posthumously: All awards are posthumous

The Elizabeth Emblem is a national form of recognition conferred by the monarch and awarded to the next of kin of United Kingdom public servants who are killed in performance of their duty. It is named in tribute to Queen Elizabeth II. It is the civilian equivalent of the Elizabeth Cross. It was introduced partly in response to campaigners, including the father of PC Nicola Hughes.

== History ==
On 9 March 2024, the introduction of the Elizabeth Emblem was announced by the Government.

On 9 November 2024, the names of the first recipients of the Elizabeth Emblem were announced by the Cabinet Office following recommendations made by the George Cross Committee to the prime minister and King. On 10 December 2024, the first Elizabeth Emblems were awarded to the next of kin of 38 fallen emergency service personnel by King Charles III at a ceremony at Windsor Castle.

== Design ==
The Emblem is silver in colour and oval. At the top is a Tudor Crown above the inscription "FOR A LIFE GIVEN IN SERVICE", surrounded by a rosemary wreath, a traditional symbol of remembrance. The name of the person commemorated is inscribed on the back.

The Emblem includes a pin, allowing it to be worn by a next of kin of the person it commemorates. A miniature of the Emblem accompanies it, which may be worn by the recipient at "that person's discretion". The Emblem is not intended to be worn directly with other medals.

Recipients of the Elizabeth Emblem also receive a memorial scroll inscribed with the name of the person commemorated. A close relative who is not the next of kin, for example a parent or partner, may be eligible for an additional memorial scroll, but not the emblem.

== Criteria ==
There are three criteria for a person to be eligible for an Elizabeth Emblem:

=== Public service ===
- A person was employed in a role by, on behalf of, or formally funded by, an eligible body. The definition of an eligible body will be granted by the UK government, a devolved government (Welsh, Scottish and Northern Ireland), local government, a Crown Dependency or a British Overseas Territory;
- A person worked, either paid or voluntary at the behest of an eligible body, including any person with a formal contract or agreement to work for an eligible body, or ordered to provide a service;
- A person worked as part of emergency services personnel (either paid or voluntary), dealing directly or indirectly with emergencies. This will include front-line workers, as well as those working in control rooms, all working for emergency services of the United Kingdom of Great Britain and Northern Ireland, a Crown Dependency or a British Overseas Territory. It also includes those who worked for mountain, cave and water rescue, weather and natural disaster response services and HM Coastguard; and,
- A person is not eligible to be commemorated by the granting of the Elizabeth Cross.

=== Circumstance of death ===
- A person's death occurred directly as a result of them taking action whilst in the course of their duty;
- A person was targeted on or off duty, as a result of their role or action they had taken;
- A person's death occurred during an operational call out, whether this was routine or for an emergency, whereby they died as a result of their response to the call;
- A person's death occurred due to them acting in assisting in an emergency situation that they were trained for, even if they were not formally on duty at the time;
- A person's death that occurred as a result of illness or injury attributable to their service; and,
- At the time of the person's death or during serving their organisation, they were not engaging in a criminal act or in such a way to place themselves or others at additional risk to their life.

=== Occurrence of death ===
- A person's death must have occurred on or after 1 January 1948; or,
- A person's death must have taken place in Palestine between 27 September 1945 and 31 December 1947.

=== Nationality ===
- A person who has died may be of any nationality; however, if they were not a British citizen, the granting of the emblem will be on agreement of the state in which they held citizenship.

== Sources ==
- "Roll of Honour" (PDF). wmfs.net. 2016.
- Cooper, Geoffrey (2009). "Roll of Honour 1899–1990" (PDF). Kent Fire and Rescue Service. Archived from the original (PDF) on 19 July 2011.
