= Police Memorial Trust =

UK charitable organisation

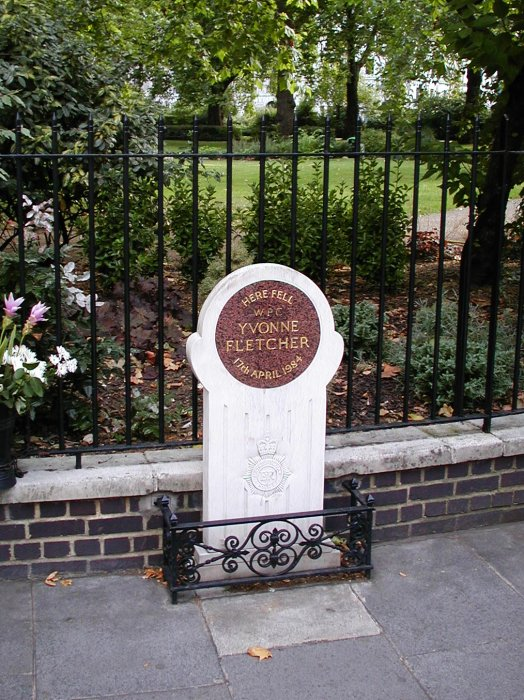
The memorial to WPC Yvonne Fletcher was the Police Memorial Trust's first

The Police Memorial Trust is a charitable organisation founded in 1984 and based in London. The trust's objective is to erect memorials to British police officers killed in the line of duty, at or near the spot where they died, thereby acting as a permanent reminder to the public of the sacrifice they made.

== Inspiration ==
The Police Memorial Trust was the brainchild of film producer Michael Winner. Inspired by the fatal shooting on 17 April 1984 of WPC Yvonne Fletcher outside the Libyan embassy in London, Winner wrote a letter to the editor of The Times newspaper suggesting a memorial be erected in Fletcher's honour. After receiving donations from members of the public, Winner established the trust on 3 May 1984.

== Memorials ==
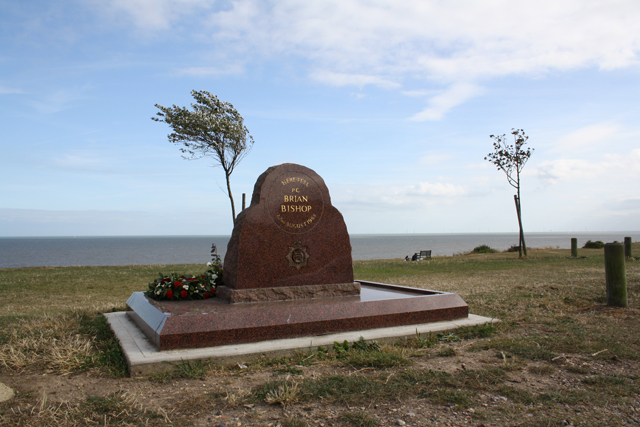
Memorial to PC Brian Bishop

The first Police Memorial Trust memorial was erected for Fletcher and was unveiled at St James's Square in London by the then prime minister Margaret Thatcher on 1 February 1985.

The trust's third memorial, and the first to be erected outside London, was sited at the seafront at Frinton-on-Sea, Essex, where PC Brian Bishop was fatally shot by an armed robber on 22 August 1984. Bishop's memorial was unveiled by the then home secretary Douglas Hurd, on 19 February 1986.

On 3 October 2008, Prime Minister Gordon Brown unveiled a monument in Luton to mark the site of the fatal stabbing of PC Jonathan Henry.

By the end of 2024, a total of 60 memorials in honour of police officers killed on duty have been erected throughout the United Kingdom. They include Insp Raymond Codling and the three officers who died in the Shepherd's Bush Murders; PC Keith Blakelock; PC Sharon Beshenivsky; and PC Ged Walker.

== National Police Memorial ==
In the mid-1990s the Police Memorial Trust proposed a single memorial for all police officers who had died in the course of their duties. This became The National Police Memorial, which is sited in St James's Park at the junction of Horse Guards Road and The Mall. It was unveiled on 26 April 2005 by Elizabeth II on behalf of the Police Memorial Trust. It contains a list of all the officers who died, supplied by the Police Roll of Honour Trust.

== See also ==
- Police Roll of Honour Trust
- List of British police officers killed in the line of duty
