= David P. Weber =

Assistant Inspector General for the SEC

- Born: David Paul Weber
- Education: Syracuse University; Syracuse University College of Law; University of Florida
- Occupations: Accounting Professor, Certified Fraud Examiner, Forensic Accountant, Attorney, Private Investigator
- Employer: West Virginia University
- Known for: former Assistant Inspector General for the U.S. Securities and Exchange Commission; whistleblower.
- Spouse: Julie Goodwin Weber
- Website: goodwinweberlaw.com/attorneys/david-p-weber/

David Paul Weber is an American criminalist, and the former Assistant Inspector General for Investigations at the U.S. Securities and Exchange Commission (SEC). He was the Principal Investigator of a $2.6 million grant by the U.S. Department of Health and Human Services, to test various white collar crime interventions concerning elder financial exploitation and high-tech crime. He is a Teaching Professor at the John Chambers College of Business and Economics at West Virginia University.

In the past, Weber was a whistleblower who reported allegations about foreign espionage against the stock exchanges, and misconduct in the Bernard L. Madoff and R. Allen Stanford Ponzi scheme investigations. In June 2013, the SEC settled with Weber his whistleblower protection and U.S. District Court lawsuits, paying him one of the largest federal employee whistleblower settlements ever.

On August 5, 2021, Weber met with the President, Speaker of the House, and Senators at the signing of H.R. 3325, the awarding of the Congressional Gold Medal for those officers who lost their lives at the Capitol Insurrection, as he represents one of the deceased police officers and his widow. He again met with the President on January 6, 2023, when his client was awarded, posthumously, the Presidential Citizens Medal. Ultimately, he was successful in having his client Police Officer Jeffrey L. Smith designated as having died in the line of duty by the District of Columbia in March 2022, and in August 2023 by the U.S. Department of Justice, having successfully advocated for Congress to change the Public Safety Officers Benefit Act to allow benefits to families of law enforcement to have died from silent injuries. In June 2025, Weber obtained a jury verdict against Officer Smith's assailant in Washington, DC, federal court. In October 2026, the National Law Enforcement Officer's Memorial Fund announced that Officer Smith's name would be added to the National Law Enforcement Memorial in Washington, DC. He is the first, and only, officer to be added to the wall due to suicide, an acknowledgement that silent injuries, such as those he suffered in January 6th, directly led to his line of duty death days later.

Weber is a forensic accounting professor at the John Chambers College of Business and Economics at West Virginia University. In the past, as part of his teaching duties at Salisbury University, he was a special investigator for the Maryland State's Attorneys Offices in two adjoining counties, and a Virginia financial crimes state prosecutor in the neighboring Virginia county. He supervised his students who acted as intern investigators on financial crime cases.

== Education ==
Weber graduated from Syracuse University with an undergraduate degree in criminal justice in 1995. He received a Juris Doctor from Syracuse University College of Law in 1998 and a Doctor of Business Administration at the University of Florida in 2023. Weber's dissertation was awarded the best forensic accounting disseration award by the American Accounting Association.

== Career ==
=== Early career ===
Weber worked as a National Park Service Ranger in upstate New York while going to law school, and previously before and during college at New York Police Department's Central Park Precinct. After graduation from law school, Weber became a law clerk to New York United States District Judge Neal P. McCurn working on criminal and civil cases. When his judge sat by designation on the United States Court of Appeals for the Second Circuit in New York City, Weber assisted with criminal and civil appeals in 1998 and 1999. Subsequently, Weber was Special Counsel for Enforcement for more than ten years at the Office of the Comptroller of the Currency, at the United States Department of the Treasury. He followed that up by practicing as Supervisory Counsel and Chief of Enforcement Unit I for the Federal Deposit Insurance Corporation (FDIC), responsible for overseeing all banking enforcement activities and investigations involving state chartered banks and bank failures for the western half of the United States.

=== Securities and Exchange Commission ===
Weber then became the U.S. Securities and Exchange Commission (SEC) Assistant Inspector General for Investigations at the Office of Inspector General, directing all criminal, civil and administrative investigations into fraud, waste and abuse in SEC programs and operations, and supervising the Office's investigative staff. In this role, he served as the SEC's chief investigator. In January 2012, H. David Kotz, SEC Inspector General during the previous four years, resigned and returned to the private sector as managing director of Gryphon Strategies. His resignation came in the midst of questions as to his conduct, as then-current and former SEC employees had complained that Kotz initiated investigations without credible evidence and unnecessarily tainted people's reputations.

==== Madoff accusations, cyber compromise, and retaliatory paid leave ====
In March 2012, Weber alleged improper conduct by Kotz, asserting that Kotz may have had personal relationships that tainted SEC investigations of the Bernard Madoff and R. Allen Stanford Ponzi schemes. Kotz said Weber's accusations were "completely and utterly ludicrous and untrue."

In May 2012, Weber was placed on administrative paid leave for purportedly creating a "hostile work environment." U.S. Senator Charles Grassley (R-Iowa) then sent a letter to SEC Chairman Mary Schapiro, asking for a copy of the "security threat evaluation" on the basis of which Weber was banned from the SEC's offices. The SEC refused to provide the supposed threat evaluation against Weber to Congress. Later, it was revealed that the supposed threat evaluation found that Weber was not a threat, did not create a hostile work environment, and could return to work. Ultimately, as part of a federal court settlement, the SEC rescinded his termination, but Weber decided to enter academia and remain in private practice instead.

==== Williams report ====
Weber's allegations against Kotz led the SEC to bring in Inspector General David Williams of the U.S. Postal Service to conduct an independent, outside review. The 2012 Williams report concluded that Kotz had in fact violated ethics rules by overseeing investigations that involved people with whom Kotz had "personal relationships."

In addition, the Williams report looked at separate allegations that Weber had created a hostile work environment at the SEC. It did not find any evidence that Weber's conduct was improper or triggered security concerns. The report did not substantiate hostile work environment and threatening behavior accusations made against Weber. Finally, the Williams report found that Weber's reports concerning deficient SEC computer security had merit.

==== Whistleblower allegations ====
Weber claimed SEC officials intended to reprise against him for revealing misconduct within the SEC in the Madoff and Stanford investigations, perjury by Chairman Mary Schapiro in testimony before the United States Senate and House of Representatives, and to delay the filing of reports to Congress on the gross misconduct of William J. Fagan (Chief of Security Services for the SEC), Jeff Heslop (Chief Operating Officer of the SEC), and Weber's investigation into the SEC for exposing potential vulnerabilities of the NYSE and NASDAQ Stock Exchange.

According to Weber, Heslop was the target of at least two OIG investigations, including whether Heslop had improperly steered work to Booz Allen Hamilton. The House Oversight and Government Reform Committee probed the allegations. Chairman Darrell Issa noted in a Thomson Reuters' report that the House investigation about the suspicious and wasteful hiring of the Booz Allen consultants was "broadly compatible" with the Weber lawsuit allegations.

According to Weber, Fagan was engaged in pay to play schemes in hiring private security contractors, as well as substantial nepotism in the hiring of security staff. Weber also alleged that Fagan engaged in a cover up of multiple sexual assaults of guard staff and a female visitor to the SEC who was assaulted on a late night due to insufficient security at the SEC's Union Station headquarters. Fagan then used the same private security contractor hired under the pay to play scheme to supposedly investigate Weber, a direct conflict of interest.

NYSE Euronext hired former Homeland Security Secretary Michael Chertoff to make sure sensitive exchange data were not breached after U.S. securities regulators left their computers unencrypted. "Everything was on those laptops," said one exchange official who spoke on the condition of anonymity. "You could find the system architecture and technology maps of both the New York Stock Exchange and the Nasdaq, information about their key data centers, their emergency plans. It's virtually everything you need to know if you were a terrorist looking to sabotage the U.S. capital markets." An SEC spokesman later confirmed that the security lapses identified by Weber did occur.

==== Dismissal and lawsuit ====
Weber worked at the SEC until October 31, 2012, when, months after becoming a whistleblower accusing the SEC of significant misconduct in the Madoff and Stanford investigations, cyber compromise of NASDAQ, as well as SEC's most senior management misconduct, he was fired for supposedly unrelated reasons. He sued the SEC in federal court in Washington, D.C., in November 2012, saying he was wrongfully terminated and retaliated against for trying to investigate misconduct at the SEC and for coming forward as a whistleblower. Less than two weeks after Weber's suits were filed, the Chairman of the SEC resigned.

Kotz responded to the civil lawsuit saying that: "for some inexplicable reason, my name has been dragged through the mud in the most ludicrous and unbelievable allegations." The SEC said it would "vigorously contest" the lawsuit. Yet, the allegations against Kotz were proven to be true, and the SEC did not contest the lawsuit, or even file an answer. Instead of vigorously contesting the lawsuit as promised, in June 2013, the SEC settled the lawsuits with Weber by paying him, reinstating him from the date of his dismissal, and clearing his personnel and security records. Weber purportedly received the third largest federal employee whistleblower payment to date. Despite being reinstated, Weber decided not to return to his former position, instead becoming a university faculty member, and growing his forensic investigations practice. In October 2015, Syracuse University College of Law named Weber as one of the first year's recipients of the new "Syracuse Law Alumni Honors" award for "distinguished achievements."

=== Post-SEC, military service, law practice, publications, and university teaching ===
==== Journalism and writing ====
In 2015–2016, as a financial expert for the International Consortium of Investigative Journalists, Weber analyzed a number of loan agreements included among the Panama Papers, a project awarded the Pulitzer Prize for explanatory reporting in 2017. A book was later written about the Panama Papers, Secrecy World, in which Weber was featured. In 2019, Secrecy World was made into a major motion picture, The Laundromat, for which Weber served as the technical consultant, and played a small cameo.

In fall 2020, Weber assisted the Associated Press in their investigation into how the Venezuelan government avoided US and global sanctions through Asia. In January 2021, Weber assisted the AP with review of the Congress override of the veto on the National Defense Authorization Act, which contained major money laundering changes to US law. In February 2021, Weber served as an expert for CBS News, which investigated Bank of America's handling of pandemic fraud connected with California Unemployment-issued debit cards. In February 2022, Weber served as an expert for the American Banker and CBS News, each of which continued their investigation into Bank of America's handling of pandemic fraud, as federal regulators including the Office of the Comptroller of the Currency and the Consumer Financial Protection Bureau considered civil penalties against the bank. In March and April 2022, Weber again served as a financial crimes expert for the International Consortium of Investigative Journalists, investigating how professionals such as accountants and lawyers created secrecy for sanctioned Russian oligarchs with deep ties to Vladimir Putin. “We, as the public, rely on these professionals to be the gatekeepers and to do the right thing,” Weber said. “They should vet their clients.”

==== Practice of law ====
While teaching full time, Weber maintains a limited practice of law. He has been a top-rated super lawyer for 2021, 2022, 2023, 2024, 2025, 2026 and 2027. He represented a key witness in the 2017-2019 Special Counsel investigation into Russian Interference. Weber's client was one of five witnesses granted immunity for testimony before the Special Grand Jury and at the trial of Paul Manafort. Weber's client also testified against Rick Gates, leading to his guilty plea. More recently, Weber represented the widow and estate of Jeffrey Smith, one of the three police officers to die at or in the aftermath of the 2021 Capitol Riot. In July 2021, Weber petitioned the Government of the District of Columbia to award line of duty death benefits for Washington, DC, Police Officer Jeffrey Smith. On August 5, 2021, Weber met with President Biden, Speaker Nancy Pelosi, and United States Senators in the Rose Garden, upon the signing of H.R. 3325, awarding the Congressional Gold Medal to the U.S. Capitol Police and Washington, D.C., Metropolitan Police Officers who lost their lives defending the United States Capitol on January 6, and April 2, 2021, including Weber's client deceased MPD Police Officer Jeffrey Smith. During the Rose Garden event, Weber pressed the President to award line of duty benefits to his client and Howard Liebengood. On March 7, 2022, Officer Smith's death was ruled to be line of duty, "the sole and direct cause" of the injuries he suffered on January 6, 2021, at the Capitol insurrection. "This is the first time where someone who has suffered a brain injury, and an emotional injury, has been acknowledged as a line-of-duty death," Weber said. "This will impact widows, widowers, children and parents of everyday heroes who have suffered these injuries in the line of duty." Weber also advocated for passage of H.R. 6943 and S.3635, the Public Safety Officer Support Act of 2022, which designated traumatic brain injuries, PTSD and other "silent" injuries as line of duty at the federal level. The bill passed the House 402-17 on May 18, 2022; and unanimously passed the United States Senate on August 1, 2022. The bill was signed into law by the President on August 17, 2022. On January 6, 2023, Weber was present at the White House when the President awarded the Presidential Citizens Medal to his client Police Officer Jeffrey L. Smith posthumously, for heroism and actions during the January 6th, 2021 U.S. Capitol Attack. The President stated: "He was part of the first line of officers who entered when the Capitol was breached. Assaulted many times, the last time with a metal pipe. After his death, his widow. . . along with many others, worked tirelessly to pass, in the Congress, the Public Safety Officers Support Act, which I signed into law last summer." On August 17, 2023, exactly a year after the President signed the revised PSOB program into law, Officer Smith was found to be the first officer to die in the line of duty under the law. In June 2025, Weber tried to jury verdict the wrongful death case against Officer Smith's assailant in U.S. District Court for the District of Columbia, obtaining punitive damages on behalf of Officer Smith's widow.

==== University teaching ====
Weber is a full time faculty member at West Virginia University. He previously taught at Salisbury University, University of Maryland Global Campus, and University of Maryland.

Weber previously supervised students as a special investigator for the Maryland State's Attorney Offices of two counties, and as a Virginia state prosecutor in a neighboring Virginia county. In October 2022, it was announced that Weber was awarded a $2.6 million grant by the U.S. Department of Health and Human Services to further the experiential learning program by focusing on elder financial and high-tech crime, through a variety of fraud-fighting interventions, while he was a professor. One of the interventions funded was to provide scholarships for students in the fraud program who work on cases, with the aim to increase interest in public service by students.

In 2024, Weber was named the 2024 Certified Fraud Examiner of the Year by the Association of Certified Fraud Examiners.

== See also ==
- List of whistleblowers
