= GMIS International =

GMIS International is the largest professional organization for public sector information technology (IT) leaders in the United States. Founded in 1971, GMIS has over 400 member organizations and sister organizations in six (6) countries - Belgium, Canada, the Netherlands, New Zealand, Sweden, and the United Kingdom. GMIS currently has active State Chapters in 30 U.S. states.

GMIS provides a forum for government agencies including federal, state, local, educational (K-12 and higher education) and special districts so that they can exchange IT best practices that enhance the delivery of government services. International affiliations provide a global perspective that enables diversity of opinions and experiences.

GMIS holds an Annual GMIS International Conference each year where IT leaders come to learn from each other and industry experts and share knowledge and lessons learned. The 2009 conference, scheduled for August 23 through 27th in Newport, Rhode Island, features keynote speaker Senior Vice President Howard Charney, is a member of Cisco’s Office of the President and Executive Staff and reports directly to CEO John Chambers.

In addition to networking with public sector IT leaders from around the world, membership in GMIS International includes access to a document repository, active listserv, leadership opportunities through participation on an Advisory Council and the Executive Board, and vendor participation to share emerging technologies and trends.

GMIS is led by a ten (10) member Executive Board consisting of a President, four Vice Presidents (1st – 4th), a Chapter Development & Conference Coordinator, an International Director, an Executive Director (immediate past president), a Treasurer, and a Conference Chairperson. The Board appoints an Editor for the GEM (GMIS Education Material), newsletter and an Executive Secretary to manage Headquarters.

The Board also appoints an Advisory Council each year, which is composed of IT leaders from member organizations, who provide advice to the Board and actively participate in a variety of Subcommittees that support the Board’s annual priorities.
