= Death of Jeffrey L. Smith =

2021 death of an American police officer

Jeffrey L. Smith
- Born: 1985 or 1986
- Died: January 15, 2021 (aged 35); Washington, D.C., U.S.
- Police career
- Country: United States
- Allegiance: District of Columbia
- Department: Metropolitan Police Department of the District of Columbia
- Service years: 2009-2021
- Rank: Police officer

Jeffrey L. Smith, a Washington, D.C. Metropolitan Police officer, shot himself on January 15, 2021, nine days after he assisted the United States Capitol Police during the attack on January 6. A psychiatrist hired by Smith's widow found that drastic changes in Smith's behavior after January 6 are evidence that the attack on the Capitol was the precipitating event leading to his suicide. On October 13, 2021, two United States Senators and several members of the House of Representatives called for Muriel Bowser, the mayor of the District of Columbia, to award Line of Duty benefits to Smith and his widow Erin Smith. On March 7, 2022, Smith's death was officially declared a line-of-duty death by the District of Columbia. After petition by his widow, DC Police and Firefighters' Retirement and Relief Board found that the "direct and sole" cause of Smith's death were the injuries he received in the line of duty while responding to the Capitol riot on January 6, 2021.

== Suicide and lawsuit ==
Smith, 35, shot himself in the head on the George Washington Memorial Parkway on January 15, 2021, the day he was supposed to return to duty. Smith's was the second of four police suicides in the immediate aftermath of the storming of the Capitol, the others being the U.S. Capitol Police officer Howard Liebengood, Gunther Hashida, and Kyle DeFreytag. In addition, one Capitol Police officer, Brian Sicknick, died of a stroke as a consequence of the riot.

Dr. Jonathan Arden, the former Chief Medical Examiner of the District of Columbia was hired by Smith's widow as part of her lawsuit to have her husband's suicide ruled "in the line of duty". His report stated that the "acute, precipitating event that caused the death of Smith was his occupational exposure to the traumatic events he suffered on January 6, 2021". On July 30, his attorney David P. Weber filed the opening brief in the attempt, on behalf of Smith's widow, to have his death ruled line of duty. Submitting this report as evidence, on August 13, Smith's widow sued two of his alleged assailants, claiming they caused a traumatic brain injury with a crowbar or a heavy walking stick, leading to his death. According to media reports, Smith's alleged attackers, named in the federal lawsuit, were identified by an internet vigilante group that analyzed publicly available videos from the Capitol attack.

On October 17, 2021, NBC News reported that the Virginia congressional delegation had written to the Washington mayor noting that Smith's death was causally related to the Capitol Riot, and urged her to grant line of duty death benefits to Smith's widow Erin Smith. On March 7, 2022, after petition by Smith's widow, Smith's death was ruled line of duty, and it was found that the "sole and direct" cause of Smith's death were the injuries he received at the United States Capitol on January 6, 2021. The D.C. Police and Firefighters' Retirement and Relief Board Order stated: ""Smith sustained a personal injury on January 6, 2021, while performing his duties and that his injury was the sole and direct cause of his death."

According to Smith's attorney David P. Weber, "This is the first time where someone who has suffered a brain injury, and an emotional injury, has been acknowledged as a line-of-duty death. This will impact widows, widowers, children and parents of everyday heroes who have suffered these injuries in the line of duty." Smith's widow is now seeking to have Smith's name added to the National Law Enforcement Officer's Memorial.

On June 23, 2025, 69-year-old chiropractor David Walls-Kaufman was ordered to pay $380,000 in punitive damages and $60,000 in compensatory damages to Erin Smith for assaulting her husband during the Capitol riot. Walls-Kaufman had served a 60-day prison sentence after pleading guilty to a misdemeanor in 2023.

== Honors ==
On August 5, 2021, Jeffrey L. Smith, along with Capitol Police officers Brian Sicknick and Howard Liebengood, were posthumously honored in a signing ceremony for a bill to award Congressional Gold Medals to Capitol Police and other January 6 responders. His name is noted in the text of the bill, and President Joe Biden remarked on his death. On August 1, 2022, Congress passed the Public Safety Officers Support Act of 2022, sending the bill to the President to be signed into law. The bill's sponsor, Senator Tammy Duckworth, stated at passage that, "I want to take a moment to recognize the incredible courage, resilience, and strength of the late Officer Jeffrey Smith's widow, Erin Smith, and his parents, Richard and Wendy Smith. Their collective determination and commitment to fixing an unjust system to prevent future families of the fallen from having to experience the emotional pain and financial harm resulting from the denial of a line-of duty death designation, played a pivotal role in the development and passage of the Public Safety Officer Support Act. I commend Erin, Richard and Wendy Smith for honoring the service of their loved one and hope that Smith's lasting legacy of spurring a long-needed change in the law provides them with comfort and confidence that his tragic loss was not in vain." The bill was signed into law by President Biden on August 16, 2022, forever changing how police mental health and brain injuries are regarded on the federal level.

On January 6, 2023, "for his extraordinary heroism, pure courage, and unwavering devotion to the nation," Smith was posthumously awarded the Presidential Citizens Medal by President Joe Biden.

On August 17, 2023, Smith's death was ruled line of duty by the Attorney General of the United States. Smith was the first death to be ruled line of duty after the Public Safety Officer Benefits Act was amended by Congress to include silent injuries. The line of death determination was made on the one-year anniversary of the PSOB amendments being signed into law by the President.

== See also ==
- Law enforcement response to the January 6 United States Capitol attack
- Police officer safety and health
