= Knee Regulatory Research Center =

The Knee Regulatory Research Center is a United States-based academic research center at West Virginia University's John Chambers College of Business and Economics. Founded in 2016, the Knee Center conducts nonpartisan research on state-level regulation, focusing on labor, healthcare, and regulatory issues.

The Knee Center maintains a national database that documents and tracks the occupational licensing regulations of hundreds of professions across the U.S. It also prepares other research reports for policymakers and the general public, in addition to organizing educational panels at academic conferences.

== Organization ==
The Knee Center was established in 2016 at Saint Francis University in Loretto, Pennsylvania. It was founded to advance research on state-level regulatory policy, particularly in the areas of occupational licensing and economic freedom. The Knee Center educates the public about policies it says remove barriers to employment and economic prosperity, such as reducing the burden of occupational licensure and repealing certificate of need laws to increase healthcare access.

In 2021, the Knee Center relocated to West Virginia University to broaden its research efforts and create new programming. It created a publicly available database that provides licensing information on 50 professions across all 50 states and Washington, D.C. The Knee Center introduced the database in a paper for the Journal of Entrepreneurship and Public Policy.

In 2024, the Knee Center published a report on child care regulations, ranking U.S. states and finding that restrictive child care regulations are linked to higher costs and lower access. Louisiana topped the ranking as the least restrictive state, while Massachusetts was the most restrictive.

In addition to educating non-students, the Knee Center also provides hand-on opportunities for students interested in economics, public policy, and research.

== Leadership ==
Alicia Plemmons serves as director of the Knee Center, while Drake Thibodaux is assistant director. Darwyyn Deyo is director of regulatory frontiers, while Conor Norris is director of labor.

Edward Timmons founded the Knee Center. He was a professor at the John Chambers College of Business and Economics.
