= Death of Howard Liebengood =

American police officer (died 2021)

Howard Charles Liebengood, a United States Capitol Police officer, died by suicide on January 9, 2021, three days after he participated in the law enforcement response to the Capitol attack. He was the first of four police suicides in the aftermath of the attack and the second officer who responded to the attack to die.

Liebengood had been a Capitol Police Officer for 15 years and was the son of Howard Scholer Liebengood, who had served as the U.S. Senate Sergeant at Arms. According to Liebengood's siblings, after making a minor mistake in the line-of-duty in 2018 Liebengood talked of harming himself, eventually removing his service weapon from his home on the advice of a suicide prevention hotline. Liebengood was on duty in the Capitol during the attack, but he was not one of the officers beaten by rioters. During the attack, Liebengood's wife said that he had told her he approached a man he thought lost to assist him, before the man began speaking aggressive German and making a Nazi salute. Liebengood left his home on the day of the attack at 10 am and did not return home until 4:30 am on January 7.

Liebengood returned to work for his shift beginning at 9:30 am on January 7 and, according to his brother, approximately 11 hours into his shift he crashed his police cruiser. Liebengood told his family that he intended to retire from the force after the attack; he did not want to put a burden on his fellow officers and so he decided to delay it until after the Inauguration of Joe Biden on January 20. He had previously intended to retire after 20 years of service, when he would have gotten full pension benefits. He said that the long shifts were exhausting and that the Capitol attack had left him drained. His wife said that following the attack he had worked "practically around the clock" for three days and was "severely sleep deprived". His family was supportive of his decision to retire. On January 9, Liebengood, aged 51, used his service weapon to kill himself.

On August 5, Liebengood was posthumously honored in a signing ceremony for a bill to award Congressional Gold Medals to Capitol Police and other January 6 responders. He was honored alongside Brian Sicknick and Jeffrey L. Smith, other officers who had died after the attack, and Billy Evans, who died in a separate 2021 attack. His name is noted in the text of the bill, and President Joe Biden remarked on his death. On May 14, the Capitol Police named their new counseling center after Liebengood.

In November 2022, the United States Department of Justice classified Liebengood's suicide as a line-of-duty death, enabling his family to receive benefits through the Public Safety Officers' Benefit Program. This was the first designation for an officer who died in connection with the attack since Congress expanded eligibility to include those suffering from the traumatic effects of what they experienced on duty.

On January 6, 2023, "for his deep dedication and selfless service," Liebengood was posthumously awarded the Presidential Citizens Medal by Biden.

== See also ==
- Police officer safety and health
