= Frank "Nordy" Hoffman =

American football player (1909–1996)

Nordy Hoffman
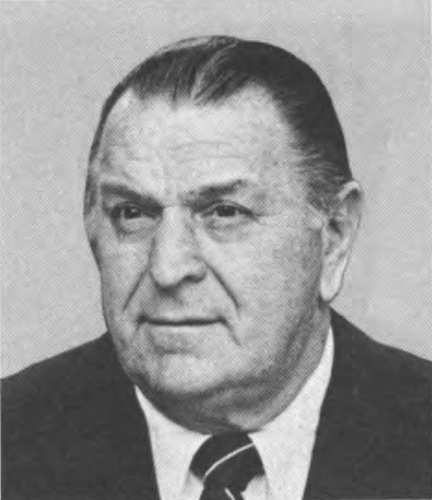

26th Sergeant at Arms and Doorkeeper of the United States Senate
- In office December 18, 1975 – January 4, 1981
- Leader: Mike Mansfield; Robert Byrd
- Preceded by: William H. Wannall
- Succeeded by: Howard Liebengood

Personal details
- Born: Frank Nordhoff Hoffmann; December 19, 1909 Seattle, Washington, U.S.
- Died: April 5, 1996 (aged 86) Potomac, Maryland, U.S.
- Education: University of Notre Dame
- Football career

Profile
- Position: Guard

Career information
- College: Notre Dame

Awards and highlights
- First-team All-American (1931)
- College Football Hall of Fame

Frank Nordhoff "Nordy" Hoffman (December 19, 1909 – April 5, 1996) was an American college football player at the University of Notre Dame where his record as All-American guard during the 1930 and 1931 seasons was commemorated, in 1978, with election to the College Football Hall of Fame. From 1975 to 1981, he served as the Sergeant at Arms of the United States Senate.

His full name was Frank Nordhoff Hoffmann and everyone called him "Nordy". Born in Seattle, he attended St. Martin High School but didn't play football there. He enrolled at the University of Notre Dame and met football coach, Knute Rockne. The coach noted his size, 6-2 and 224 pounds, and asked Nordy to try out for football. As a sophomore, he was a fourth-string tackle on the 1929 squad that included some legendary Notre Dame names...Frank Carideo, Marty Brill, Frank Leahy, Marchy Schwartz, Tommy Yarr and Jack Cannon. He moved up to the varsity as a second-string tackle in 1930 and first-string guard in 1931. The Associated Press and Liberty named him to their All-America teams. The Notre Dame Fighting Irish football publicist, Joe Petritz, described Nordy as "the spark plug of the line, inspirational, fast, aggressive and consistent". He was a shot putter on the track team, and the student paper referred to him as a blue-eyed, blond-haired athlete who played piano and sang. He was inducted into the Hall of Fame in 1978, and he called the ceremonies of the National Football Foundation, "the most beautiful thing that has happened to me". One of his prizes at his Hall of Fame induction was a book filled with letters of congratulation from presidents Jimmy Carter, Gerald Ford and all 100 U.S. Senators. Nordy served as sergeant-at-arms of the U.S. Senate, retiring in 1981.

Hoffman died in Potomac, Maryland at the age of 86.

Political offices
Preceded by William H. Wannall	Sergeant at Arms of the United States Senate; 1975–1981	Succeeded by Howard S. Liebengood
