= Howard Scholer Liebengood =

Sergeant at Arms of the U.S. Senate (1942–2005)

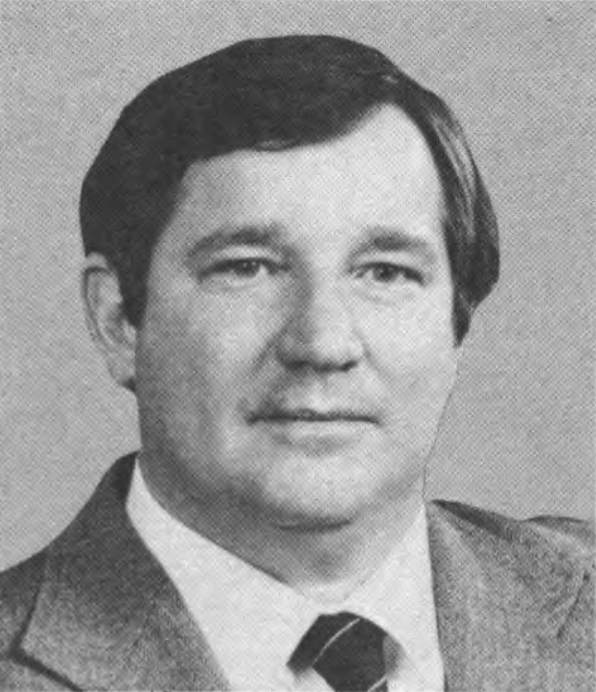

27th Sergeant at Arms and Doorkeeper of the United States Senate
- In office January 5, 1981 – September 12, 1983
- Leader: Howard Baker
- Preceded by: Nordy Hoffman
- Succeeded by: Larry E. Smith

Personal details
- Born: Howard Scholer Liebengood; December 29, 1942 South Bend, Indiana, U.S.
- Died: January 13, 2005 (aged 62) Vienna, Virginia, U.S.
- Spouse: Deanna Mickey
- Children: 3, including Howard
- Education: Kansas State University; Vanderbilt University

Military service
- Allegiance: United States
- Branch/service: United States Army
- Battles/wars: Vietnam War

Howard Scholer Liebengood (December 29, 1942 – January 13, 2005) was an American lawyer and lobbyist. A protégé of Senator Howard Baker, he served as Sergeant at Arms of the United States Senate from 1981 to 1983 before leaving to become a lobbyist for the Tobacco Institute. He later served as chief of staff to Senators Fred Thompson and Bill Frist.

== Early life, family and education ==
Liebengood was born in South Bend, Indiana, and raised in Plymouth, Indiana. He received his undergraduate degree from Kansas State University and earned his law degree in Vanderbilt University Law School in Nashville, Tennessee in 1967. At Vanderbilt, Liebengood met Fred Thompson, who became a close and lifelong friend.

Liebengood served in the U.S. Army military police from 1968 to 1970, including in Vietnam, and was decorated with the Bronze Star and Army Commendation Medal.

== Career ==
He worked as a lawyer in Nashville before becoming minority (Republican) counsel to the Senate Watergate Committee in 1973. In 1974, he and Thompson co-founded a law firm in Nashville. In 1975, Liebengood returned to Washington to work as a consultant for the Church Committee (Senate Select Committee to Study Governmental Operations with Respect to Intelligence Activities). The next year, he became minority staff director of the Senate Select Committee on Intelligence. In 1980, he became legislative counsel to Senator Howard Baker. Liebengood and William Hildenbrand were Baker's two leading advisors.

From 1981, Liebengood became sergeant-at-arms of the US Senate; in that role, he supervised more than 1,200 employees, including 500 Capitol Police officers, 185 computer specialists, nine carpenters, and seven barbers. In 1983, Liebengood stepped down to become executive vice president for federal relations at the Tobacco Institute. In 1984, Liebengood and Martin B. Gold established the lobbying firm Gold and Liebengood, which lobbied on behalf of clients such as the Chemical Manufacturers Association, Federal Express, Fiat, Martin Marietta and the Hopi tribe. In 1989, Burson-Marsteller purchased the firm, and Liebengood moved to the Powell, Goldstein, Frazer & Murphy law firm before becoming the head lobbyist for the Philip Morris Companies Inc. in 1995. In 2001, he became chief of staff to Thompson, who had become a US senator; in 2003, after Thompson retired, Liebengood became chief of staff to Republican Senator Bill Frist of Tennessee, the Senate Majority Leader.

== Personal life and demise ==
Liebengood was married and had three children.

On January 13, 2005, one month after retiring, Liebengood died at his home in Vienna, Virginia, of a heart attack.

His son, Howard Liebengood, was a US Capitol Police officer who participated in the law enforcement response during the January 6 United States Capitol attack in 2021. He joined Capitol Police in April 2005. His death by suicide at age 51, occurred on January 9, 2021, three days after the Capitol attack.

Political offices
Preceded by Nordy Hoffman	Sergeant at Arms of the United States Senate; 1981–1983	Succeeded by Larry E. Smith
