= Death of Brian Sicknick =

2021 death of American police officer

- Part of the January 6 United States Capitol attack
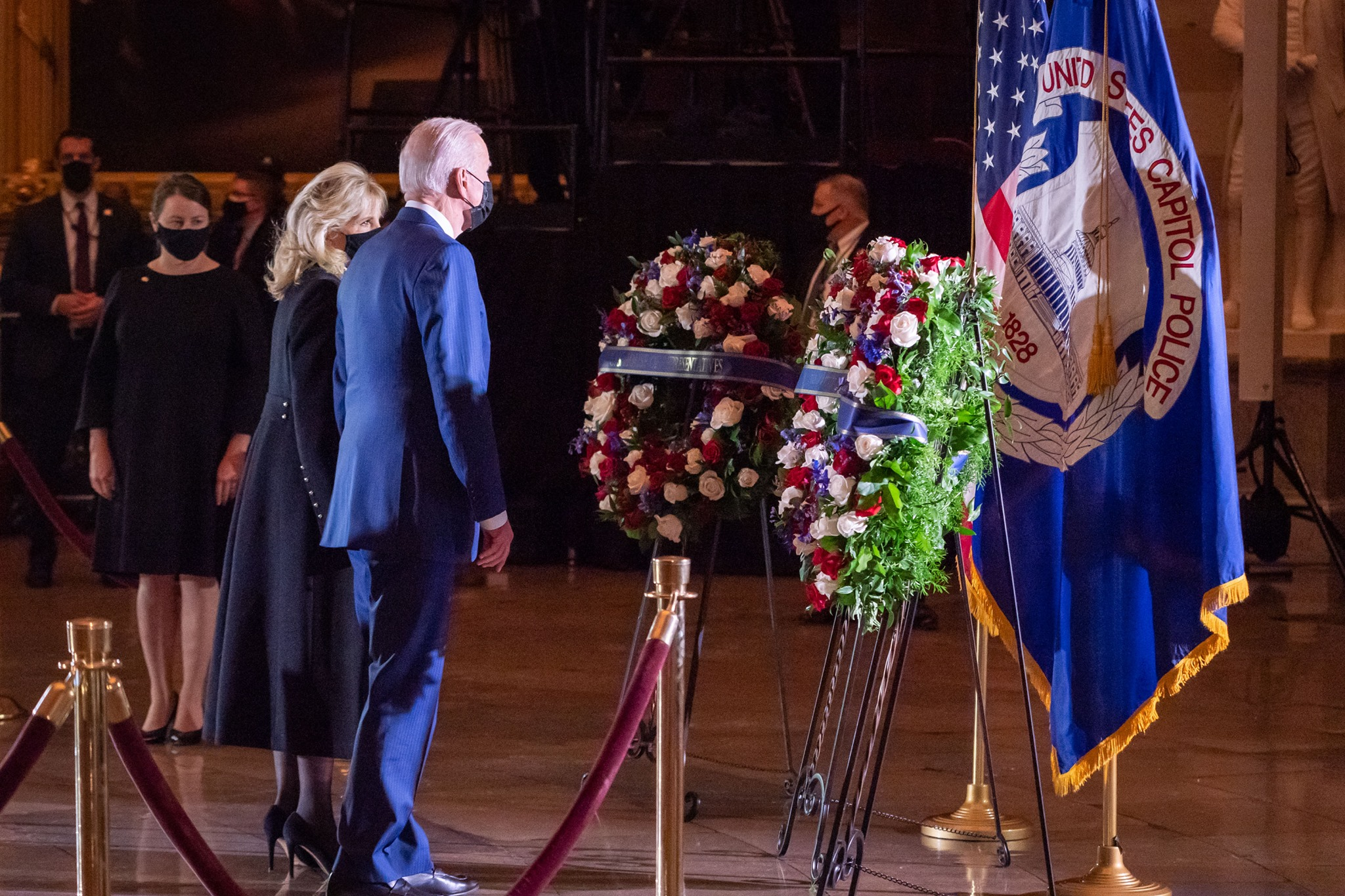
- President Joe Biden and First Lady Jill Biden attend the viewing for Sicknick's remains at the Capitol on February 2, 2021.
- Location: United States Capitol, Washington, D.C., U.S.
- Date: Attack: January 6, 2021; Death: January 7, 2021; 5 years ago
- Attack type: Assault
- Weapon: Pepper spray
- Victim: Brian Sicknick
- Perpetrators: Julian Elie Khater; George Pierre Tanios
- Verdict: Pleaded guilty
- Convictions: Khater: Assaulting an officer with a dangerous weapon (2 counts); Tanios: Disorderly and disruptive conduct in a restricted building (2 counts)
- Sentence: Khater: 6 2/3 years in prison Tanios: 10 months in prison

On January 7, 2021, Brian Sicknick, a United States Capitol Police (USCP) officer, died in a hospital the day after collapsing at the U.S. Capitol after suffering two strokes. Sicknick had responded to the attack on January 6, during which he had been assaulted with pepper spray by two rioters. His cremated remains were laid in honor in the Capitol Rotunda on February 2, 2021, before they were buried with full honors at Arlington National Cemetery.

Within a day of his death, the U.S. Capitol Police and the U.S. Justice Department announced that his death was due to injuries from the attack. For several weeks, several media sources incorrectly reported Sicknick had died after being struck in the head with a fire extinguisher during the unrest, citing two "anonymous law enforcement officials" as their source. Months later, however, the Washington, D.C. medical examiner reported that Sicknick had died as a result of two strokes, classifying his death as due to natural causes, (Note: "Natural: Used when a disease alone causes death. If death is hastened by an injury, the manner of death is not considered natural.") later commenting that there was no evidence Sicknick had suffered either an allergic reaction or any internal or external injuries, while noting "all that transpired played a role in his condition". The ruling was criticized by some expert neurologists, who argued that, as traumatic events can lead to stroke, the stress resulting from the insurrection at the Capitol may have directly caused Sicknick's stroke.

Sicknick's death was investigated by the Metropolitan Police Department's Homicide Branch, the USCP, and the FBI. On March 14, 2021, Julian Elie Khater and George Pierre Tanios were arrested and charged with assaulting Sicknick with a chemical spray. They were not charged in connection with Sicknick's death. On July 27, 2022, Tanios pleaded guilty to lesser misdemeanor charges unrelated to the assault on Sicknick. On January 28, 2023, Khater was sentenced to almost seven years in prison for assaulting two officers, including Sicknick, with a dangerous weapon. Both Khater and Tanios were pardoned on January 20, 2025, by Donald Trump on the first day of his second administration as part of his blanket pardon to nearly all people convicted of or charged with offenses related to the Capitol attack.

== Biography ==
Brian Sicknick
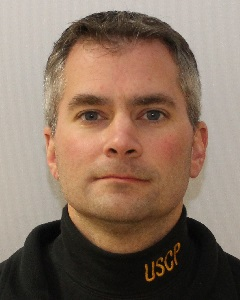
- Born: Brian David Sicknick; July 30, 1978; New Brunswick, New Jersey, U.S.
- Died: January 7, 2021 (aged 42); Washington, D.C., U.S.
- Resting place: Arlington National Cemetery
- Education: University of Phoenix (BS)
- Known for: Being a victim of assault during the January 6 United States Capitol attack
- Police career
- Department: United States Capitol Police
- Service years: 2008–2021
- Awards: Presidential Citizens Medal (2023; posthumously)
- Military career
- Allegiance: United States
- Branch: United States Air Force
- Service years: 1997–2003
- Rank: Staff sergeant
- Unit: New Jersey Air National Guard
- Conflicts: Operation Southern Watch; Operation Enduring Freedom

Brian David Sicknick (July 30, 1978 – January 7, 2021) was born in New Brunswick, New Jersey to Gladys and Charles Sicknick. He grew up in South River, New Jersey, as the youngest of three brothers. According to his brother Craig, the Sicknicks were "a non-traditional family, a blend of Jewish and Presbyterian" and celebrated both Christmas and Hanukkah. Sicknick attended East Brunswick Technical High School to study electronics but later aspired to become a police officer. He graduated in 1997.

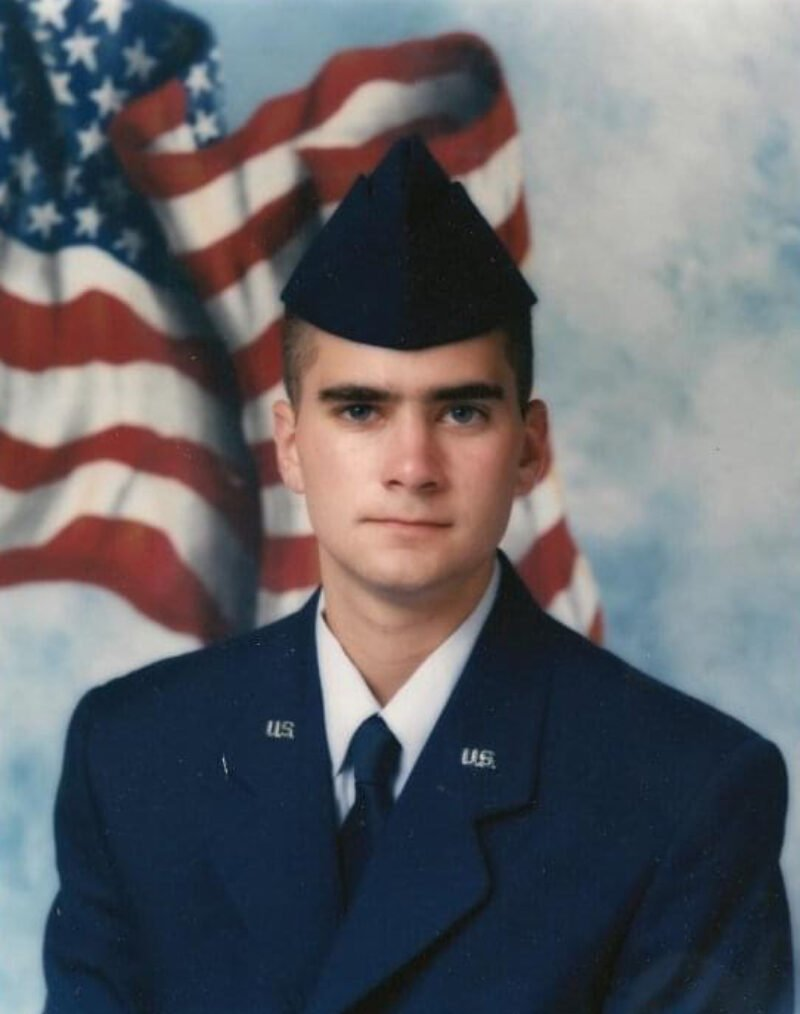
Sicknick's basic training photo in 1997

After struggling to find a job as a police officer, Sicknick joined the New Jersey Air National Guard in 1997 to strengthen his background for future applications. He served with the 108th Wing at Joint Base McGuire–Dix–Lakehurst in the 108th Security Force Squadron as a fire team member and leader with the security force squadron. In 1998, he wrote a letter to Home News Tribune, his local newspaper, expressing his skepticism towards America's soft stance against Saddam Hussein.

Sicknick was deployed to Saudi Arabia to support Operation Southern Watch in 1999 and then to Kyrgyzstan to support Operation Enduring Freedom in 2003. Following the September 11 attacks, Sicknick criticized U.S. motivations for the War in Afghanistan and the government's strategy in the Iraq War. In 2003, he wrote again to Home News Tribune, noting a decline in morale among troops. He was honorably discharged in that same year as a staff sergeant.

Sicknick also worked as a school custodian in Cranbury, New Jersey. He later moved to Springfield, Virginia, and joined the United States Capitol Police in 2008. One of his first assignments at the Capitol was for the first inauguration of Barack Obama in 2009. In 2013, he earned a Bachelor of Science in Criminal Justice degree from the University of Phoenix. Sicknick was an outspoken supporter of Donald Trump during the 2016 presidential election but those who had met him said his political views "did not align neatly with one political party." Sicknick opposed Trump's impeachment, supported gun control, opposed animal cruelty and was concerned about the national debt. He was remembered by Caroline Behringer, a staffer for House Speaker Nancy Pelosi, for comforting her as she returned to work at the Capitol following Trump's 2016 victory.

== Events of January 6 ==
During the attack on the U.S. Capitol on January 6, 2021, Sicknick was on duty with the Capitol Police outside the Capitol's west side, on the front line facing protesters. At 2:23 p.m., rioters attempted to breach the police line formed by barricades of bicycle racks. Sicknick and some other officers there were pepper sprayed and became unable to perform their duties for about 20 minutes. Sicknick retreated, bent over, and used water to wash out his face. Within five minutes of the pepper spray attack, rioters breached the police line and seized control of the west side of the building.

There was no evidence that Sicknick had any injuries or an allergic reaction to the chemical spray, according to a statement by the medical examiner months later. Sicknick texted his brother on Wednesday night after the attack, reporting that he had been twice attacked with pepper spray and was in good shape. However, Sicknick later collapsed around 10 p.m. at the Capitol (Note: Accounts of Sicknick collapsing vary. On January 7, the police said, "He returned to his division office and collapsed." the medical examiner said on April 19 that he collapsed at the Capitol.) and was taken to a local hospital.

== Death ==
After being in the hospital for almost a day, Sicknick died around 9:30 p.m. on January 7, 2021. Earlier that day, he had two strokes. The strokes were due to a basilar artery blood clot, which caused damage to his brainstem and cerebellum.

Sicknick's family had been informed that he was treated for a stroke caused by a blood clot, and had been surviving on a ventilator. Family members drove from New Jersey and had not yet arrived at the hospital when he died. The Sicknick family urged the public and press not to politicize his death.

On the night of his passing, the Capitol Police announced Sicknick's death in a press release stating that "Sicknick passed away due to injuries sustained while on-duty". Months later, the medical examiner reported that Sicknick had no injuries, and died of natural causes.

== Medical examiner report ==
On April 19, 2021, the Office of the Chief Medical Examiner of the District of Columbia issued a press release about the death of Sicknick. The release said that the manner of death was natural and the cause of death was "acute brainstem and cerebellar infarcts due to acute basilar artery thrombosis" (two strokes at the base of the brain stem caused by an artery clot). The term "natural" was used to indicate a death caused by a disease alone; and if an injury contributed to the manner of death, it would not be considered natural. (Note: From the medical examiner's press release: "Accident: Used when there is no evidence of intent; an unintentional, sudden, and unexpected death. Homicide: Death results from the intentional harm of one person by another, including actions of grossly reckless behavior. Natural: Used when a disease alone causes death. If death is hastened by an injury, the manner of death is not considered natural. Suicide: Death results from the purposeful attempt to end one’s life. Undetermined: Used when there is insufficient information to assign another manner.") It took more than 100 days to release these results from the January autopsy, and the full report was not released to the public.

The chief medical examiner, Dr. Francisco J. Diaz, told The Washington Post that there was no evidence that Sicknick was injured or had an allergic reaction to chemical irritants. Due to privacy laws, he declined to say whether Sicknick had a preexisting medical condition. Dr. Diaz noted that Sicknick had engaged the rioters and said "all that transpired played a role in his condition".

Dr. Cyril Wecht, who was not privy to any official documents and based his opinion solely on media reports, told CNN that he was "shocked" by Diaz's finding, that "natural does not seem like the right fit," and that it "could well be a homicide.” Two neurologists and a cardiologist told CNN that stressful events can conceivably cause the kind of blood clots that lead to strokes.

The Capitol Police said it accepted the medical examiner's findings "but this does not change the fact Officer Brian Sicknick died in the line of duty, courageously defending Congress and the Capitol".

== Misinformation about cause of death ==
Accounts of Sicknick's death changed over time, amid an atmosphere of confusion. At first, there were erroneous rumors, and, then, there was incorrect information from the authorities and news media that lasted for months.

As his condition deteriorated in the hospital on January 7, rumors had begun to circulate of an officer's death. In the afternoon, the U.S. Capitol Police (USCP) issued a statement rebutting such reports. Within hours of Sicknick's death later that evening, the Capitol Police released another statement saying that Sicknick died "due to injuries sustained while on-duty" while "physically engaging with protesters" at the Capitol. On January 8, the United States Department of Justice published a statement by Acting Attorney General Jeffrey A. Rosen, which attributed Sicknick's death "to injuries he suffered defending the U.S. Capitol, against the violent mob who stormed it". Months later on April 19, the medical examiner reported that there was no evidence that Sicknick had any injuries.

Some initial media reports regarding Sicknick's cause of death were incorrect. On January 8, the Associated Press, The Wall Street Journal, and separate stories in The New York Times cited two anonymous law enforcement officials as saying that Sicknick was struck in the head by a fire extinguisher. Similar reports followed on January 9. Meanwhile, Sicknick's father said Sicknick was pepper-sprayed and hit in the head, reported Reuters on January 10. However, the subsequent autopsy reveled that there was no evidence of any blunt force trauma to Sicknick or any internal or external injuries.

On February 2, the House of Representatives made a reference to the New York Times article about Sicknick's death. A memorandum for the second impeachment trial of Donald Trump stated "The insurrectionists killed a Capitol Police officer by striking him in the head with a fire extinguisher". On the same day, CNN reported that according to a law enforcement official, medical examiners had not found evidence of blunt force trauma on Sicknick's body. Investigators then thought the reports that Sicknick was injured by being struck with a fire extinguisher were false. On February 11, The New York Times reported that "police sources and investigators are at odds" over whether Sicknick had been hit with a fire extinguisher. On February 12, the Times hedged its initial reporting with an update posted to the story and Sicknick's autopsy found no evidence of blunt force trauma or either internal or external injuries.

On February 2, it was reported that investigators were considering a chemical irritant as a possible cause of death. There were false implications by prosecutors that the chemical irritant was bear spray, until April 27 when they said it was pepper spray. On April 19, the medical examiner said that there was no evidence that Sicknick had an allergic reaction to a chemical spray.

In April and May 2021, Senator Ron Johnson (R-WI) sent letters to the acting U.S. Capitol Police chief requesting information on the handling of Sicknick's death. USCP General Counsel Thomas DiBiase replied that the department did not put out a release that Sicknick was assaulted with a fire extinguisher, and that DiBiase was unaware of any communication between the USCP and House Impeachment Managers about Sicknick's death.

== Investigation and charges ==
In a January 7 press release, the U.S. Capitol Police (USCP) said that Sicknick's death would be investigated. The next day, the USCP opened a homicide investigation into Sicknick's death, joined by the D.C. Metropolitan Police Department and other federal agencies.

On February 2, CNN reported that investigators were having trouble finding evidence of homicide. One law enforcement official said that medical examiners found no evidence of any blunt force trauma. So investigators concluded that early reports of Sicknick being hit with a fire extinguisher were false. They considered the possibility that Sicknick became ill from a chemical irritant spray and were reviewing videos for evidence.

On March 14, Julian Elie Khater and George Pierre Tanios were arrested by federal authorities and charged with crimes that included assault of Officer Sicknick with a chemical spray. There could not be a charge of homicide because the cause of death had not been determined. Autopsy results were still pending almost 10 weeks after Sicknick's death.

In an April 19 press release, the medical examiner's office said that Sicknick's death was by natural causes. The ruling made it difficult for prosecutors to pursue homicide charges. A week later, prosecutors said that the chemical sprayed on Sicknick was pepper spray.

On January 27, 2023, Khater was sentenced to 6 years and 8 months in prison after pleading guilty to assaulting Capitol Police officers, including Sicknick, with a keychain pepper spray. Tanios was sentenced to 10 months in prison.

== Civil case ==
In January 2023, Sicknick's partner, Sandra Garza, filed a civil case for wrongful death and conspiracy (among other claims) against Trump, Khater and Tanios, requesting $10 million from each defendant. In January 2024, the wrongful death claims were dismissed as were two negligence claims against Trump. A claim of presidential immunity by Trump was also dismissed.

== Memorials ==
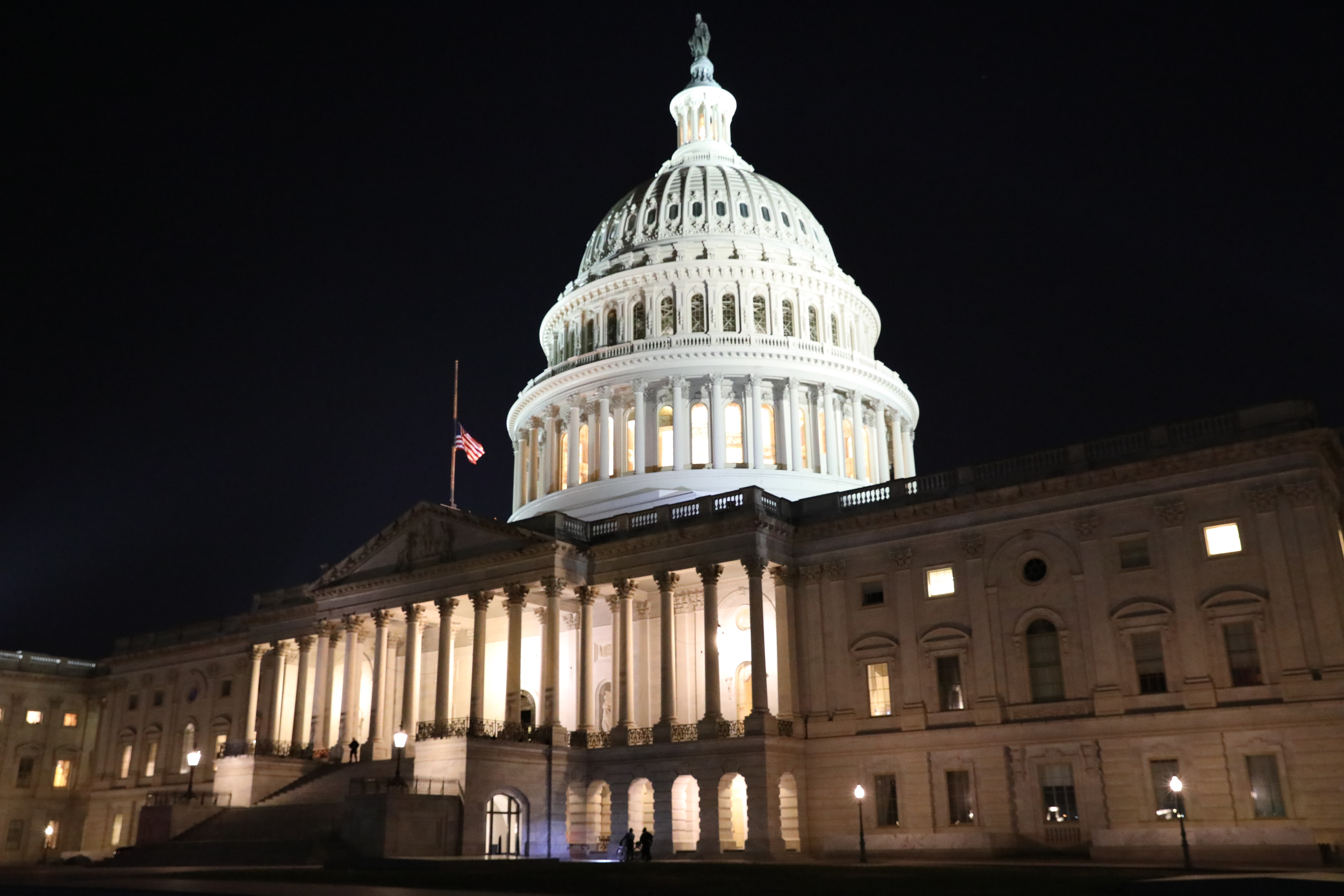
Flag at the Capitol at half-staff on January 12 in honor of Sicknick

On January 8, 2021, House Speaker Nancy Pelosi ordered flags at the Capitol to be lowered to half-staff in honor of Sicknick. Former House Speaker Paul Ryan gave his condolences to Sicknick on Twitter. Outgoing Vice President Mike Pence called Sicknick's family to offer his condolences, and a deputy press secretary for the Trump administration issued a written statement. The following weekend, Trump ordered flags to be flown at half-staff at all federal buildings, grounds, and vessels for three days. The governors of New Jersey and Virginia also ordered flags to be flown at half-staff in their respective states. On January 12, 2021, a memorial service was held in Sicknick's hometown of South River, New Jersey. His family, New Jersey Senator Bob Menendez, and local officials were in attendance. Menendez presented Sicknick's family with the flag that had flown over the Capitol in his honor. Sicknick's high school, East Brunswick Technical High School, announced plans to plant an oak tree on campus in his honor. The New Jersey Devils ice hockey team aired a video of New Jersey Governor Phil Murphy giving a brief eulogy for Sicknick followed by a moment of silence.

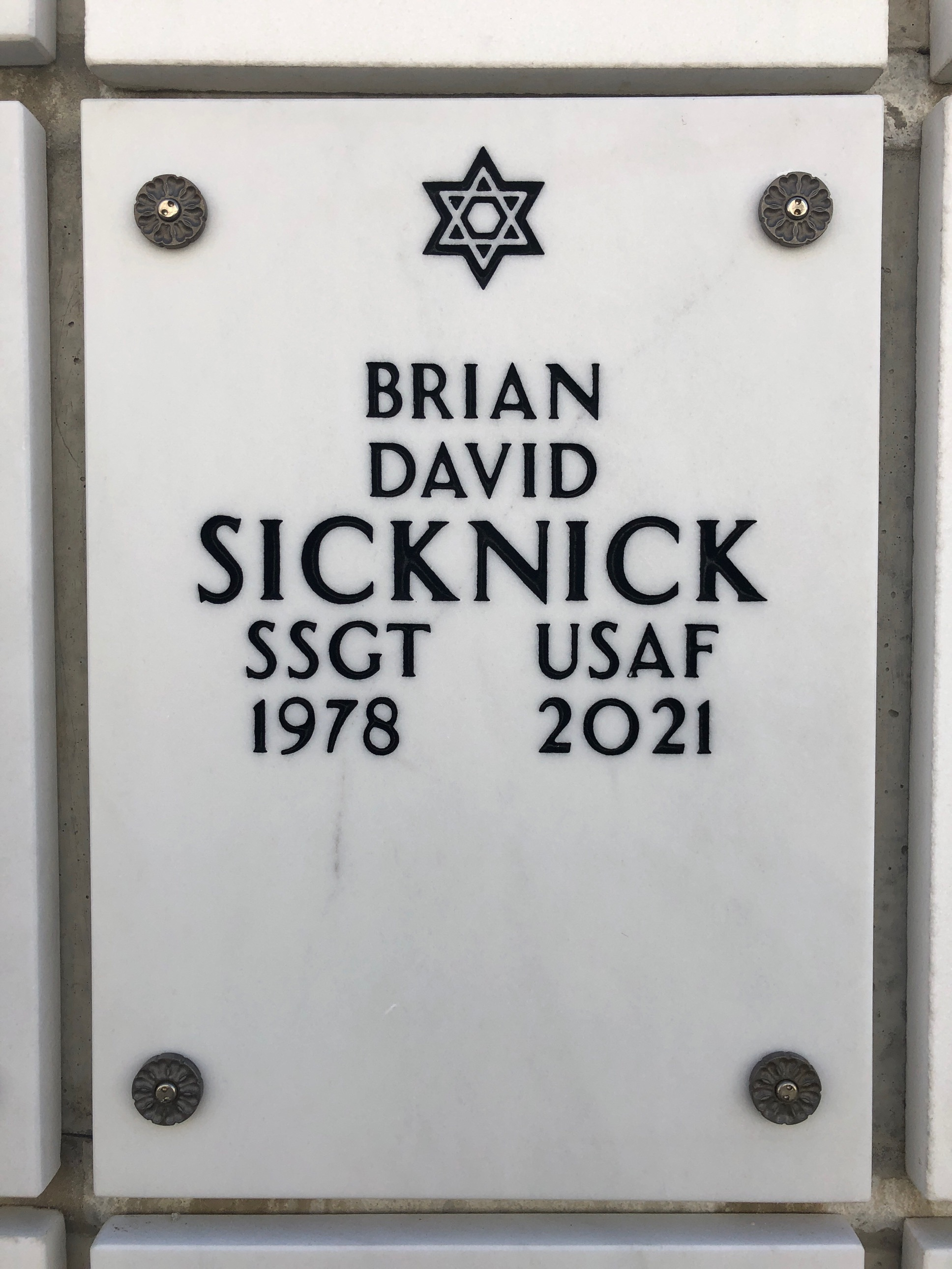
Sicknick's niche at Arlington National Cemetery

On January 29, Pelosi and Senate Majority Leader Chuck Schumer announced that Sicknick would lie in honor at the Capitol rotunda. The arrival ceremony began on the evening of February 2, 2021, at the Capitol's east front, followed by a viewing period attended by President Joe Biden, who had taken office on January 20, and First Lady Jill Biden. Vice President Kamala Harris and Second Gentleman Doug Emhoff paid their respects on February 3, along with several legislators and police officers. Later that day, Sicknick's cremated remains, accompanied by a procession, departed the Capitol for Arlington National Cemetery, where burial took place. Representative Dan Crenshaw, who Sicknick's brother described as "one of Brian's favorite people on the Hill," delivered the eulogy.

Members of Sicknick's family attended Super Bowl LV in February 2021 as honored guests of the National Football League, along with three officers of the Metropolitan Police Department.

On August 5, 2021, Sicknick, along with Capitol Police officers Howard Liebengood and Billy Evans, and Metropolitan Police officer Jeffrey L. Smith, was posthumously honored in a signing ceremony for a bill to award Congressional Gold Medals to Capitol Police and other January 6 responders. His name is noted in the text of the bill, and Biden remarked on his death. At the December 2022 Congressional Gold Medal ceremony, Sicknick's family members refused to shake the hands of Republican leaders Mitch McConnell and Kevin McCarthy.

On January 6, 2023, for his role in defending the U.S. Capitol, Sicknick was posthumously awarded the Presidential Citizens Medal by President Joe Biden.

== See also ==
- Jacob Chestnut and John Gibson, Capitol Police officers killed during the 1998 United States Capitol shooting

== Notes ==
Honorary titles
Preceded by Ruth Bader Ginsburg	Persons who have lain in state or honor in the United States Capitol rotunda February 2–3, 2021	Succeeded by William Evans
