= Per Arnoldi =

Danish designer and artist

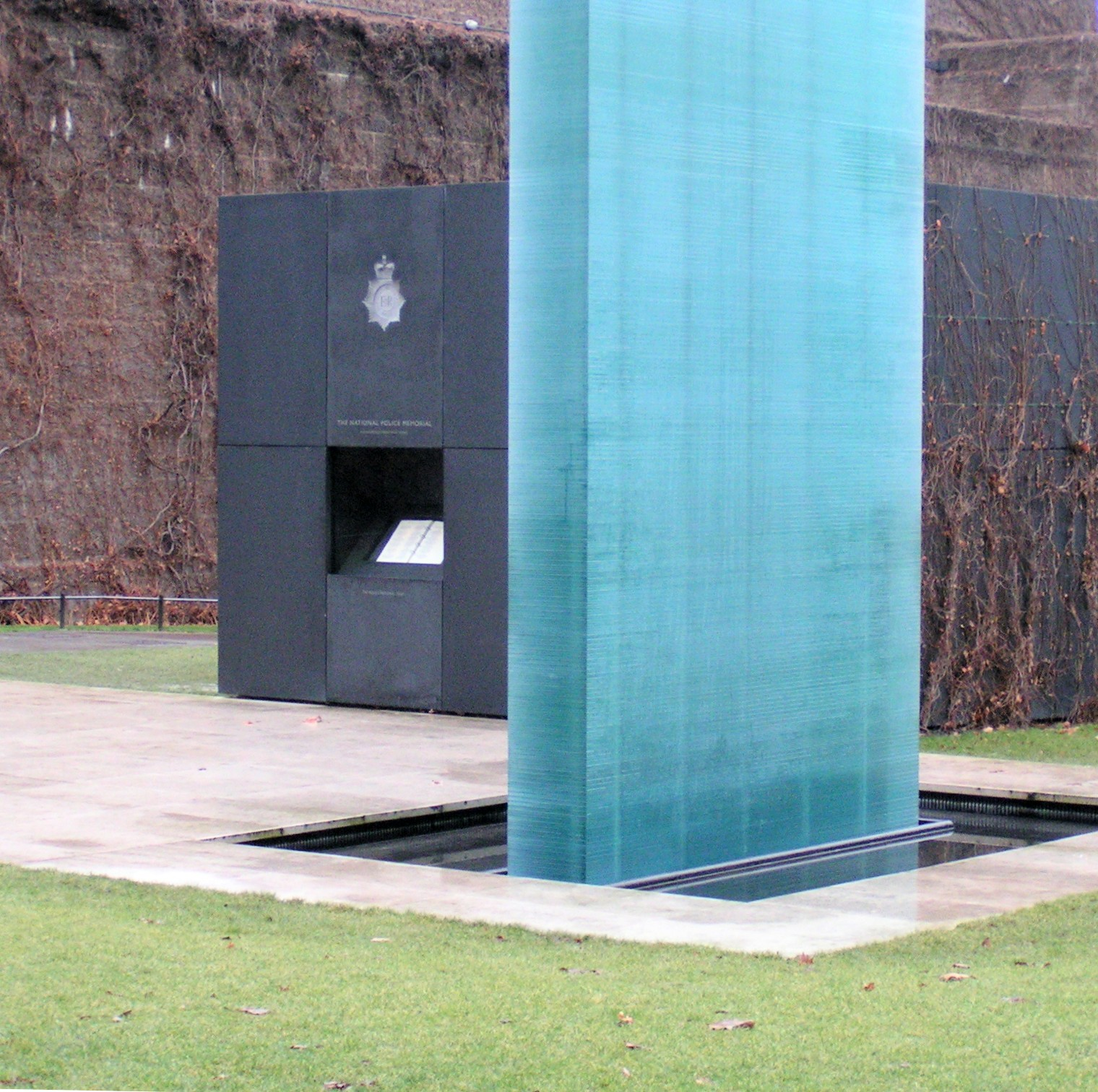
The National Police Memorial in London, co-designed with Foster + Partners

Per Arnoldi (born 25 May 1941 in Copenhagen) is a Danish designer and artist. He has worked with many media, including painting, sculptures, ceramics and posters and has made designs for many companies, organisations and institutions, doing air planes, train stations, hospitals, architecture, monuments, stores, company profiles, handicrafts and everyday utensils. His characteristic simplistic expressions are often categorized as modern art. Arnoldi has worked in many countries around the world and is on permanent exhibit in several prestigious art and design institutions for his unique and influential productions, including Museum of Modern Art in New York.

Apart from his prolific poster art production, some of Arnoldi's best known single works are the logo and curtains designs of the Copenhagen Opera House from 2004 and London's National Police Memorial, co-designed with Peter Ridley from Foster + Partners. Other well-known works include the "Romantic Construction", "The Wall", and "Corrections". Herning Museum of Contemporary Art in Denmark holds the largest permanent display of his work.

In Denmark, Arnoldi is a well-known art mediator, hosting TV shows about art through most of the 80's. From 2008 to 2010, he was a member of Akademirådet (The Academy Council) at the Royal Danish Academy of Fine Arts and he was appointed chairman for Kunstrådet (The Art Council) in the Danish government administration for about a year in 2011.

== Background ==
Arnoldi is educated schoolteacher and worked as such for a short time before his interest in and engagement with painting, design and art became his primary occupation. He is best known for his poster art and in particular his DSB train posters from 1975 onwards became public darlings in Denmark. He worked with the magazine Mobilia (about modernist furniture, interior decoration and crafts) for about 10 years, learning the craft of graphic design. As a painter, Arnoldi is autodidact and he exhibited for the first time in 1961, twenty years old.

Per Arnoldi is a lifelong fan of jazz music, and apart from his many jazz related posters, he hosts monthly jazz radio shows and occasionally tours with a jazz trio.

== Work ==
=== Museums representation ===
Museums where Per Arnoldi's work is represented include:

- Museum of Modern Art, New York City, United States
- Museum of Modern Art, Toyama, Japan
- Victoria and Albert Museum, London
- Cooper Hewitt, Smithsonian Design Museum, New York, United States
- Stedelijk Museum, Amsterdam
- Gemeentemuseum Den Haag, Haag
- Neues Museum für Angewandte Kunst, München
- Israel Museum, Jerusalem
- Royal Print Collection, Danish National Gallery, Copenhagen
- Kunstindustrimuseet
- Nordjyllands Kunstmuseum
- Randers Kunstmuseum

=== Commissions ===
Per Arnoldi has created art work for institutions such as:

- Commerzbank Headquarters, Frankfurt
- Der Reichstag, Berlin
- Deutsche Bundesbahn
- Japan Railways
- Tanaka Business School, London

=== Poster work ===
Per Arnoldi has made posters for institutions including:

- Guggenheim Museum, New York City
- Museum of Contemporary Art, Chicago
- Lincoln Center, New York City
- Louisiana Museum of Modern Art, Denmark
- Royal Danish Theatre
- American Ballet Theatre
- Chicago Symphony Orchestra
- Montreux Festival
- British Rail
- DSB
- Novo
- Siemens

== Awards and accolades ==
- 1985 Toulouse-Lautrec Award
- 1993 Prix Savignac, Paris
- 1996 Gold medal at 4th Poster Biennale, Mexico City
- 1997 Honor Award, American Institute of Architects
- Statens Kunstfond's 3-years work grant, 2000
- 2000 Eckersberg Medal, Royal Danish Academy of Fine Arts
- 2003 Order of the Dannebrogsordenen

== Literature ==
Per Arnoldi has written and authored several books.

- Per Arnoldi (2017): "Solo", Gyldendal (in Danish)
- Per Arnoldi (2015): "Rodchenkos korridor og andre opdelinger", Viborg Kunsthals Forlag (in Danish)
- Per Arnoldi (2007): "Colour is Communication. Selected Projects for Foster + Partners", Birkhauser
- Per Arnoldi (1991): "Allround", HEART - Herning Museum of Contemporary Art
