= Police officer safety and health =

Issues affecting the safety and health of police officers

Police officers face various occupational hazards such as poor ergonomics that can cause musculoskeletal problems, exposure to infectious diseases and illicit substances, noise from training on the use of firearms, line of duty deaths and work stress.

== Occupational Hazards ==
=== Ergonomic Hazards ===
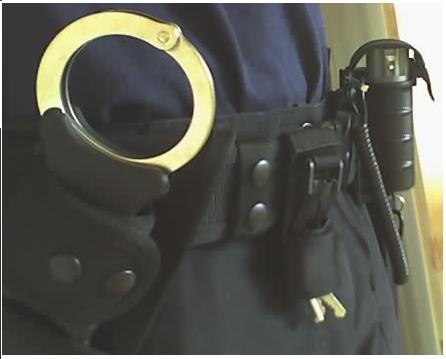
Police officer duty belt

Law enforcement is a hazardous profession with various inherent sources of risk. A common occupational risk for police officers is poor ergonomics. In fact, it is estimated that 67% of police officers experience chronic low back pain due to ergonomic issues such as prolonged sitting in patrol cars and wearing heavy duty belts. Heavy and cumbersome duty belts can be of special concern to female officers. Recent innovations have been targeted at decreasing the weight and size of the belt without compromising necessary tools. In recent years, some law enforcement organizations have introduced physical wellness programs that hope to mitigate ergonomic problems through strength training and general exercise.

=== Noise from firearms' training ===
Law enforcement officers are required to train regularly in the use of firearms, typically at indoor firing ranges. Training schedules vary widely, from eight hours four times a year, every month for special teams, up to 20 times a month for the agency’s firearms instructors. In these training sessions, an officer could accrue hundreds to thousands of rounds of exposure to firearms impulse noise. Such exposures can exceed the occupational health limits of 140 decibels (dB), with sound levels often reaching 160-170 dB peak sound pressure levels. These could lead to hearing disorders such as hearing loss and tinnitus. While hearing protection devices are often provided in the US, officers rarely receive information on hearing loss prevention or hearing protection devices.

=== Lead ===
Training conducted in firing ranges can also expose those who train or work at the range to lead, as detected by blood lead levels. Lead is considered an occupational hazard for those who work or train target shooting in firing ranges. Lead exposures at work have been associated with neurological effects, gastrointestinal effects, anemia, and kidney disease. In the US the Occupational Safety and Health Administration (OSHA), promulgated a lead standard that regulates many workplace exposures to this metal across manufacturing industries. Similarly, many other occupational health agencies in different countries also regulated lead exposures. OSHA identified ways to reduce lead exposures in firing ranges such improving ventilation systems, removing dust and debris use of wet mopping or high-efficiency particulate air vacuuming, and using lead-free bullets.

=== Bloodborne pathogen exposure ===
According to the National Institute for Occupational Safety and Health (NIOSH) 3.8%-8% of police officers in the United States have reported sustaining a needlestick or sharps injury. These types of injuries often occur during such activities as performing an arrest, searching property or being involved in a take-down. Needlestick and sharps injuries are concerning because they carry the risk of transmission of infectious diseases such as Human Immunodeficiency Virus (HIV), Hepatitis B and Hepatitis C. The incidence of officer needlestick injuries can be reduced through employer prevention training and education. NIOSH has provided official educational material for employers and police officers that targets prevention as well as steps to follow if a needlestick injury does occur.

=== Unintentional Exposure to Illicit Drugs ===
Exposure to illicit drugs is a common occupational hazard for police officers and thus proper education and use of personal protective equipment is crucial. Possible routes of exposure include inhalation, contact with a mucous membrane or non-intact skin, ingestion or via needlestick. In recent years, occupational exposure to fentanyl powder by law enforcement has been heavily publicized. NIOSH provided guidance noting that officers should wear nitrile gloves, respiratory protection, and eye protection to avoid unintentional fentanyl exposure. While use of appropriate personal protective equipment is crucial, efforts have been made to alleviate anxiety around fentanyl overdose by educating officers that an overdose would not occur through the absorption of the drug via intact skin.

== Line of duty deaths ==
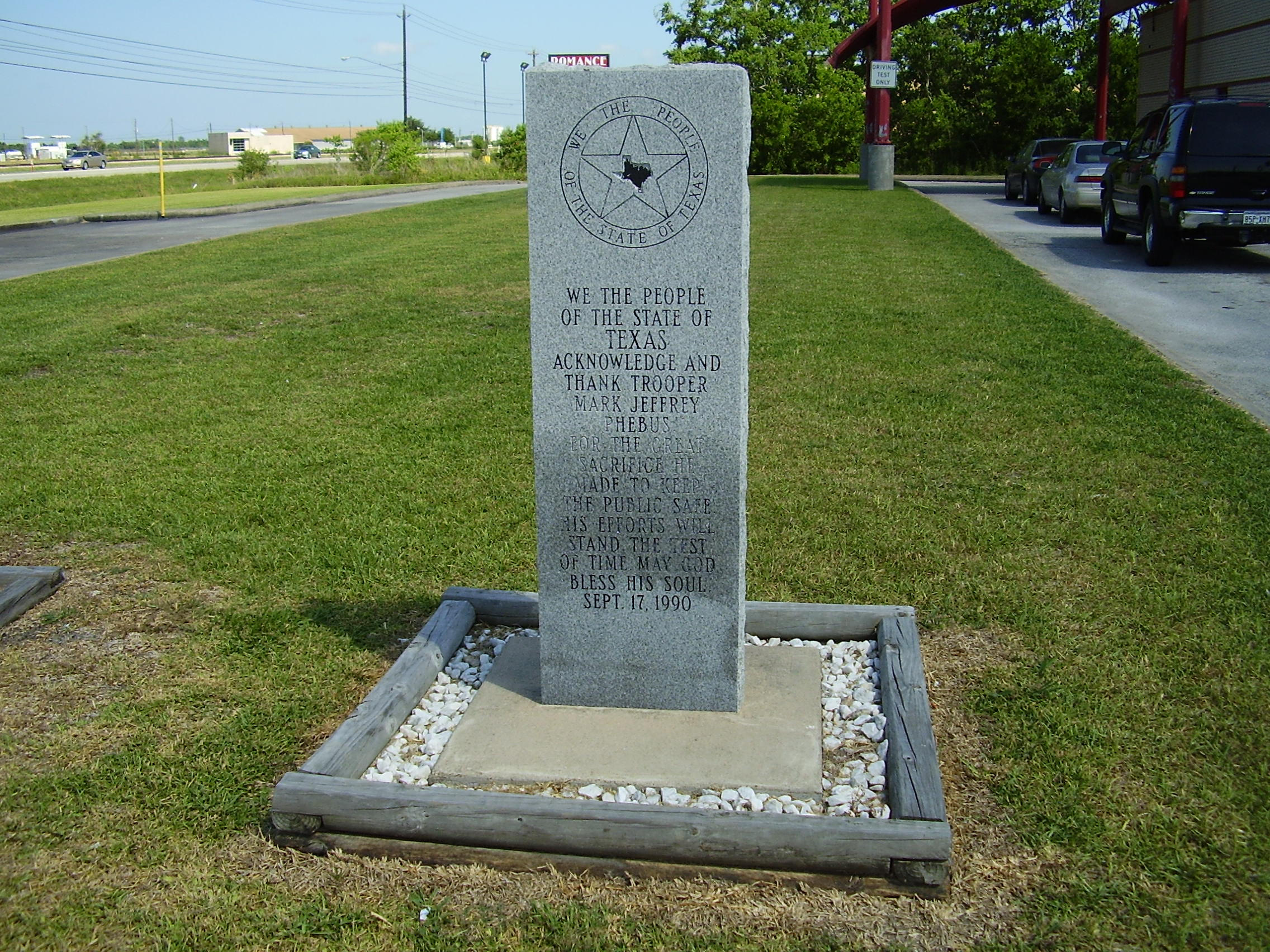
Memorial to a fallen police officer at the Texas Department of Public Safety Houston Webster Office in Houston

Line of duty deaths are deaths which occur while an officer is conducting their appointed duties. Despite the increased risk of being a victim of a homicide, automobile accidents are the most common cause of officer deaths. Officers are more likely to be involved in traffic accidents because of their large amount of time spent conducting vehicle patrols, or directing traffic, as well as their work outside their vehicles alongside or on the roadway, or in dangerous pursuits. Officers killed by suspects make up a smaller proportion of deaths. In the U.S. in 2005, 156 line of duty deaths were recorded of which 44% were from assaults on officers, 35% vehicle related (only 3% during vehicular pursuits) and the rest from other causes: heart attacks during arrests/foot/vehicular pursuits, falling from heights during foot chases, diseases contracted either from suspects' body fluids or, more rarely, from window period emergency blood transfusions received after motor vehicle accidents, shootings, stabbings, accidental gun discharges or falls that result in blood loss.

Police officers who die in the line of duty, especially those who die from the actions of suspects or in accidents or heart attacks, are often given elaborate funerals, attended by large numbers of fellow officers. Their families may also be entitled to special pensions. Fallen officers are often remembered in public memorials, such as the National Law Enforcement Officers Memorial in the U.S., the National Police Memorial in the U.K. and the Scottish Police Memorial, at the Scottish Police College.

In the United Kingdom, in the 10 years from April 2000 there were 143 line of duty deaths: 54 in road accidents travelling to or from duty, 46 in road accidents on duty, 23 from natural causes on duty, 15 from criminal acts, and 5 in other accidents. In Great Britain, police do not normally carry firearms. Officers in Northern Ireland are routinely armed.

The Singapore Police Force registered just over 100 deaths in a century up to the year 2000. There have been 28 New Zealand police officers killed by criminals since 1890.

== Work stress ==
A video on the Buffalo Cardio-Metabolic Occupational Police Stress study

=== Indicators ===
The actual presence of stress in police work is well documented and evidenced by certain statistics. Researchers typically use suicide, divorce and alcoholism rates as three key indexes of stress in a group of people. These factors paint a compelling picture of police officers demonstrating signs of significant stress, for example:

- A study in the United States, by National Surveillance of Police Suicide Study (NSOPS), showed 141 suicides in 2008 and 143 in 2009. This yields a suicide rate of 17/100,000, a figure that holds up under scrutiny and is consistent with CDC/NOMS data. The overall suicide rate in the United States was 11.3 suicide deaths per 100,000 people. There is some speculation or controversy that this official rate may understate the actual rate as it is often other police officers that report facts that lead to a cause of death determination, and death benefits, institutional image, and other factors may be incentives to misreport incident facts. It is speculated that some suicides are reported by fellow officers as accidents or as deaths in the line of duty perpetrated by unknown assailants. Also, many jurisdictions simply don't keep suicide statistics. Even though the information is incomplete, the available statistics suggest that police officers are more likely to commit suicide than the general population. However, there is still controversy in the interpretation of these statistics. When comparisons are made within age, gender, and racial cohorts, the differences are much less dramatic. Although suicides may be notably more prevalent among police, it is not clear whether police suicides are the result of work stress or the consequence of other variables, such as the influence of a subculture of violence
- Police officers are not more likely to experience interpersonal relationship problems. In a 2009 study, the divorce rates of law enforcement personnel were compared with the rates for other occupations, where data was analyzed from the 2000 U.S. Census. The results of the analysis indicate that the divorce rate for law enforcement personnel is lower than that of the general population, even after controlling for demographic and other job-related variables. The propensity to domestic violence is also thought to be higher for police officers than the general population, though the statistics are very fuzzy and controversial. Police officers also seem to have relationship problems at work, typically with superiors or with political oversight, though the evidence is largely anecdotal and controversial.
- Alcoholism is considered another aberrant statistic for police officers. Although the statistics are fuzzy, clinically treated alcohol addiction rates are usually calculated to be about twice as high for police officers than for the general population in the United States. In contrast, statistics documenting alcohol abuse are less precise. Rates for arrest for driving under the influence of alcohol, or DUI or DWI, are somewhat higher for police officers than for other drivers, but the statistics are not widely trusted outside of the insurance industry since it is other police officers that make DUI arrests. Some departments and even some individual officers tend to hold police officers to a higher behavioral and ethical standard while others will recognize a 'blue line' behind which those within the 'brotherhood' are not held to the same standards as the rest of society. Despite the controversies in the interpretation of the statistics, it is generally considered evident that police officers are more susceptible to alcohol abuse than other occupations. The same conclusions are usually made regarding the police abuse of other substances, though the statistics are even less accurate, and even though the higher rates of substance abuse may be due in part to the more ready access to drugs and the more permissive atmosphere 'behind the blue line' rather than to occupational stresses.
- In August 2014, the U.S. Federal Bureau of Investigation revealed that 8 out of every 10 law enforcement officers are overweight. This sparked some Police Departments to improve their officers' overall fitness. Assistant Chief Jeff Bryan of Garland, Texas stated, "I think it's important for all of us to keep the weight down and stay in shape-especially this job. The stress that we incur at this job... this is a great way to relieve stress and to keep the blood pressure down." Indonesian policemen are required to participate in an exercise program because. In 2009, Mexican police also "set up a nutrition education program." In 2011, Russia's interior ministry warned its police officers, "lose weight or lose your job."

Other researchers, though, claim that police officers are more psychologically healthy than the general population. Police officers are increasingly more educated, more likely to engage in a regular program of exercise and to consume less alcohol and tobacco, and increasingly family-oriented. Healthy behavior patterns typically observed at entry training usually continue throughout the career of an officer. Even though the presence of occupation related stress seems to be well documented, it is highly controversial. Many within the law enforcement industry claim the propagation of incorrect suicide, divorce, and substance abuse statistics comes from people or organizations with political or social agendas, and that the presence of these beliefs within the industry makes it hard for health workers to help police officers in need of treatment to deal with the fear of negative consequences from police work which is necessary to enable police officers to develop a healthy expectancy of success in treatment.

=== Sources ===
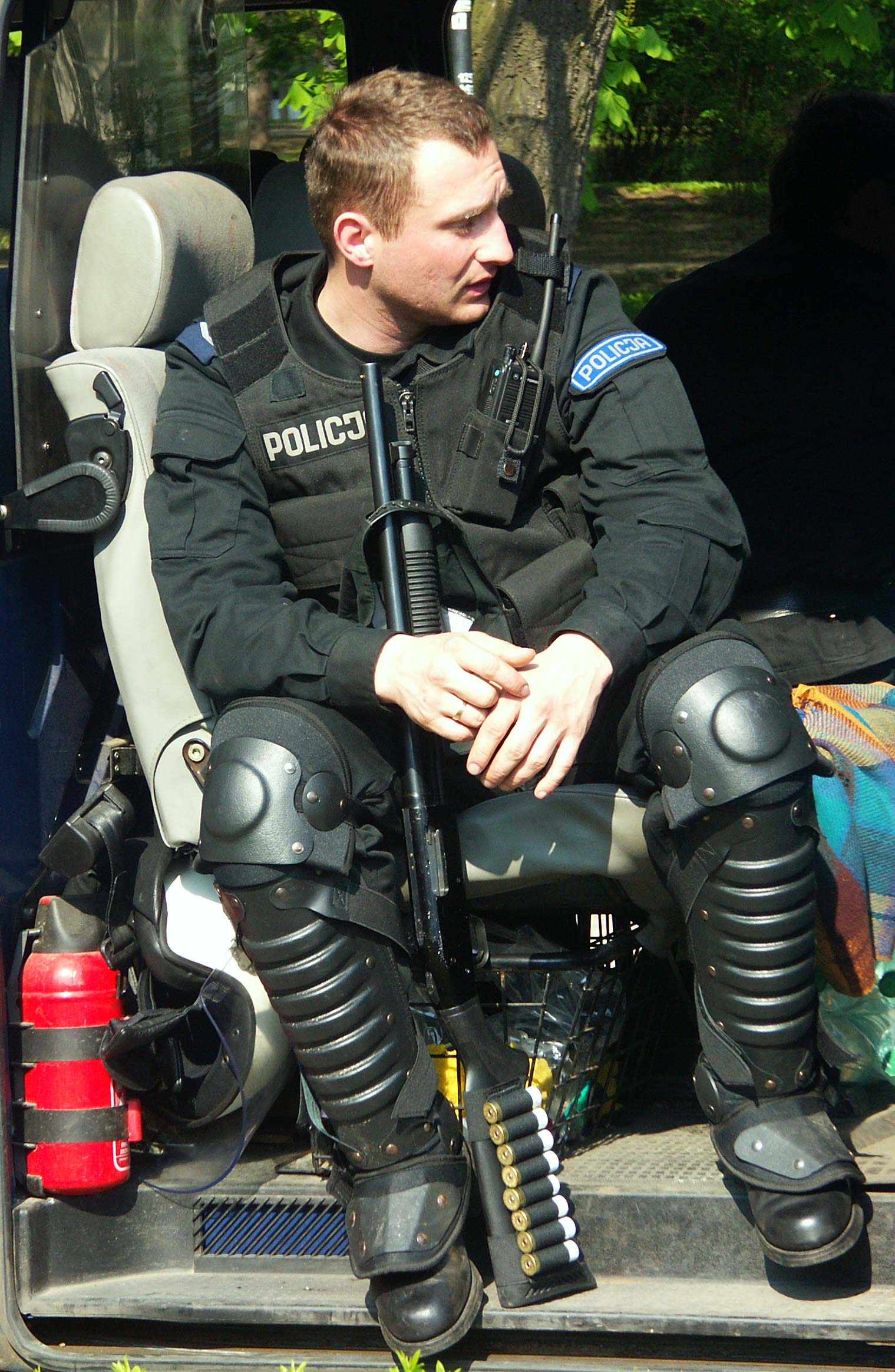
Polish police (riot control squad)

Even though the presence of occupational stresses appear to be well documented, though not without controversy, the causes of workplace stress are comparatively unclear or even a matter of conjecture. An explanation often advanced is the idea that police officers will undergo some traumatic experience in their police work that they never recover from, leading to suicide, divorce, etc. However, since the effects of such traumatic stresses is readily recognized, there are usually proactive programs in place to help individual police officers deal with the psychological effects of a traumatic event. Unfortunately, there is some evidence that such programs are actually ineffective, especially group therapies, may re-traumatize the participant, weaken coping mechanisms, and contribute to the development of post traumatic stress disorder (PTSD).

Observations where police officers and other emergency workers, such as firemen, experience the same traumatic event, it is more likely that the police officer will have difficulty dealing with the long term emotional effects of the traumatic event. On this observation, some of the academic literature suggests that along these lines the causes of occupational stress is more complex for police officers. Stress in police work is often present in other occupations, but not in an ongoing capacity. One line of thinking is that the individual stresses of police work produce a condition of chronic stress. Police officers encounter stressors in call after call which sap their emotional strength. Debilitation from this daily stress accumulates making officers more vulnerable to traumatic incidents and normal pressures of life. The weakening process is often too slow to see; neither a person nor his friends are aware of the damage being done. The effects of chronic stresses is two-fold:

- First, prolonged stress causes people to regress. Their psychological growth reverses, and they become more immature. They rapidly become more childish and primitive, much like a person being sick for several days becoming more irritable and childish in its demands on other people.
- Second, chronic stress numbs people's sensitivity. They can't stand to continually see human misery. They must stop feeling or they won't survive. The mind has this defense mechanism so people can continue working in horrible situations. If they kept their normal sensitivity, they would fall apart. As they become insensitive to their own suffering, they become insensitive to the suffering of others. When treated with indignity, they lose not only a sense of their own dignity but also the dignity of others. The pain of others stops bothering them, and they are no longer bothered when they hurt others.

The daily work of a police officer involves certain paradoxes and conflicts which may be difficult to deal with, the predominant examples are

- Interaction with the public, whether socially or officially, such as in a traffic stop, involves a risk of physical harm. Being on guard for an attack and treating every interpersonal situation with affirmative commands makes the police officer appear brutal and detached, limits his actual effectiveness with the public and engenders chronic stress.

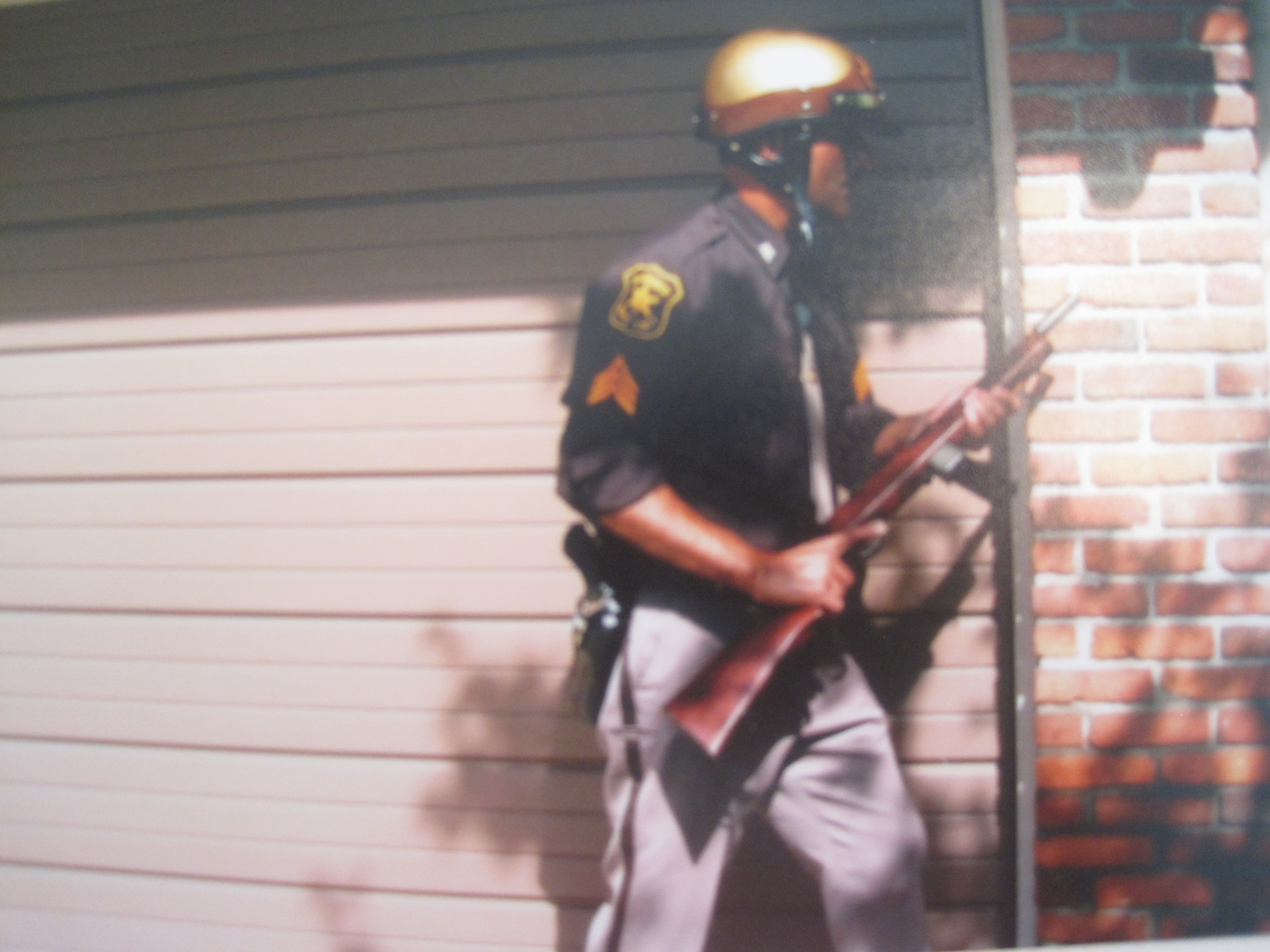
US deputy sheriff with a Reising submachine gun

- Policies, regulations, and procedures cover every facet of police work. Everything is expected to be done by the book with substantial repercussions, including civil and criminal liability, for varying from the expectations of operating procedures. Often the facts of a situation require a course of action that does not follow procedures. If he follows procedures exactly, he knows he won't fully help the public, and the public will think he is shirking his responsibility. If the officer follows his own judgment, he is taking a risk. The community and department expect officers to use judgment, but when they do, there is a danger they will be disciplined; another unnatural no-win situation engendering chronic stress.
- Police officers tend to become socially isolated. The reasons given for this isolation are lack of department support, a perceived sense of alienation from the residents of the community where they patrol, the degree of urbanism ("Big City"), and "anti-police" judicial verdicts. When a group of people are isolated they become disoriented and confused. Ironically an isolated class are usually the ones losing real world wisdom and tend to judge from a very limited perspective, leading to more stress.

A more anecdotal view looks at specific sources of stress in police work. The sources of stress most often actually cited are:

- The fear of killing someone in the line of duty.
- Feeling at least partially responsible for getting your partner or somebody else killed in the line of duty.
- Lack of support by the department or superiors.
- The scheduling of work and irregular work demands resulting in a disruption of family time or family events or activities.

Other more academic studies have produced similar lists, but may include items that the more anecdotal surveys do not reveal, such as 'exposure to neglected, battered, or dead children.'

Again, the actual fear of occupational death or physical harm is not high on the list of stress sources.

There have been numerous academic studies on the specific sources of police stress, and most conclude organizational culture and workload as the key issues in officer stress.

Traumatic events are usually concluded to not be of sufficient scope or prevalence to account for prevalence of suicide, divorce, and substance abuse abnormalities.

On August 6, 2019, New Jersey Attorney General Gurbir Grewal announced creation of the first U.S. statewide program to support the mental health of police officers. The goal of the program would be to train officers in emotional resiliency and to help destigmatize mental health issues.

== See also ==
- Occupational safety and health
- Workplace violence
