= National Police Memorial (United Kingdom) =

Memorial in London

- Police Memorial Trust & Police Roll of Honour Trust
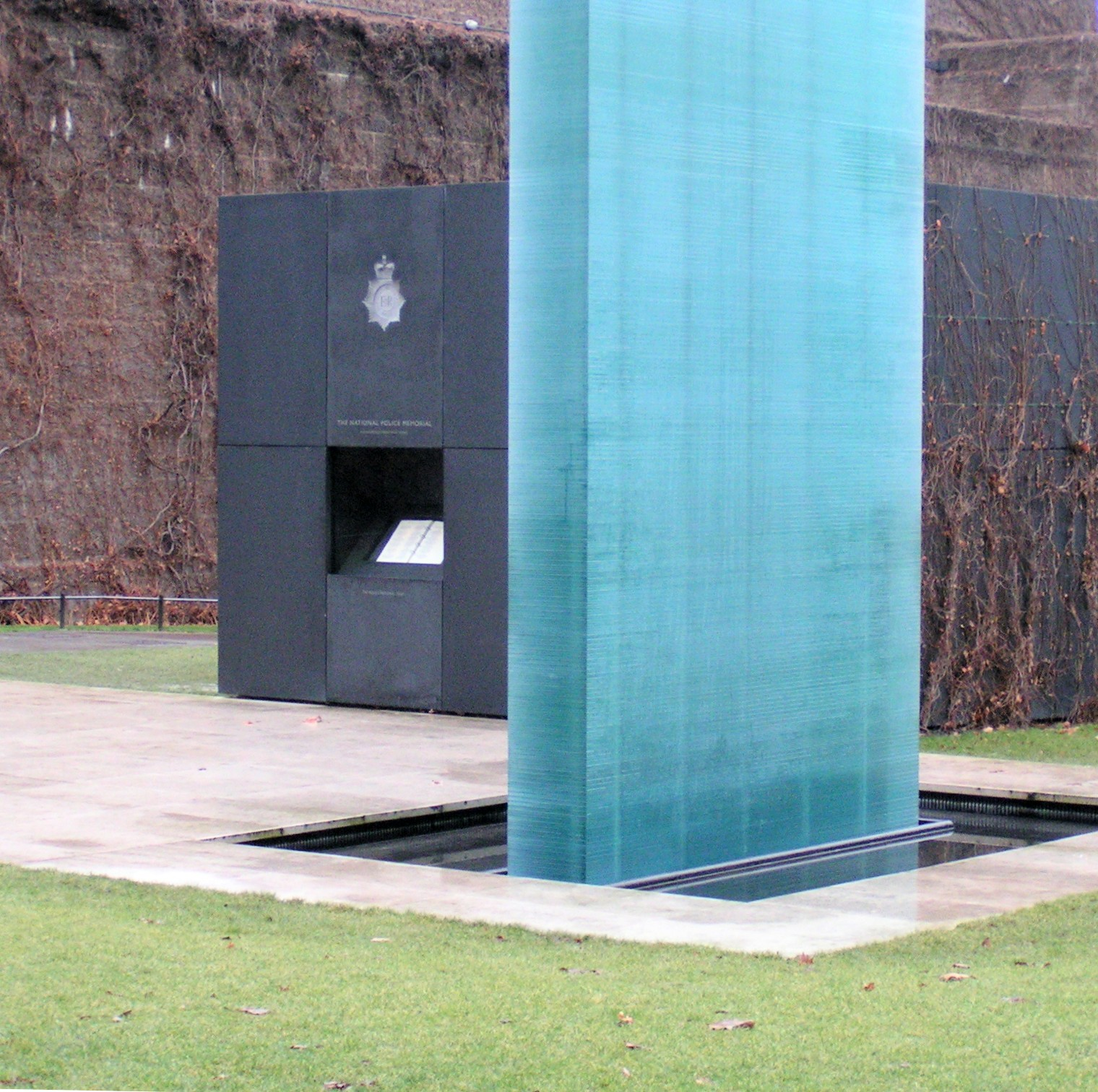
- For UK police officers killed in the execution of their duty
- Unveiled: 26 April 2005; 21 years ago
- Location: 51°30′20.67″N 00°7′48.23″W; London, SW1
- Designed by: Lord Norman Foster and Per Arnoldi
- The National Police Memorial: Honouring Those who Serve

The National Police Memorial is a memorial in central London, commemorating about 4,000 police officers killed in the course of their duties in the United Kingdom. It was designed by Lord Foster of Thames Bank and Per Arnoldi and unveiled in 2005. The project architect for Foster was Peter Ridley.

== Historical background ==
In 1984, following the shooting of Yvonne Fletcher, film director Michael Winner founded the Police Memorial Trust. Initially the trust concentrated on erecting smaller monuments at the points where officers had died on duty. From the mid-1990s, the trust also lobbied and raised funds for a single, larger scale memorial to commemorate all police officers who had died in the course of their duties. Winner stated that "Memorials to soldiers, sailors and airmen are commonplace, but the police fight a war with no beginning and no end".

Winner donated £500,000 of his own money to the campaign for a national memorial. The remainder of the total cost of £2.3 million was met by a public collection. After a ten-year campaign, Westminster City Council granted planning permission in October 2002.

== Design and construction ==
The memorial was built to a design by Lord Foster of Thames Bank and Danish designer Per Arnoldi, on the corner of The Mall and Horse Guards Road, directly outside the Old Admiralty Building. The site was occupied at the time by an air shaft on the Bakerloo line of the London Underground.

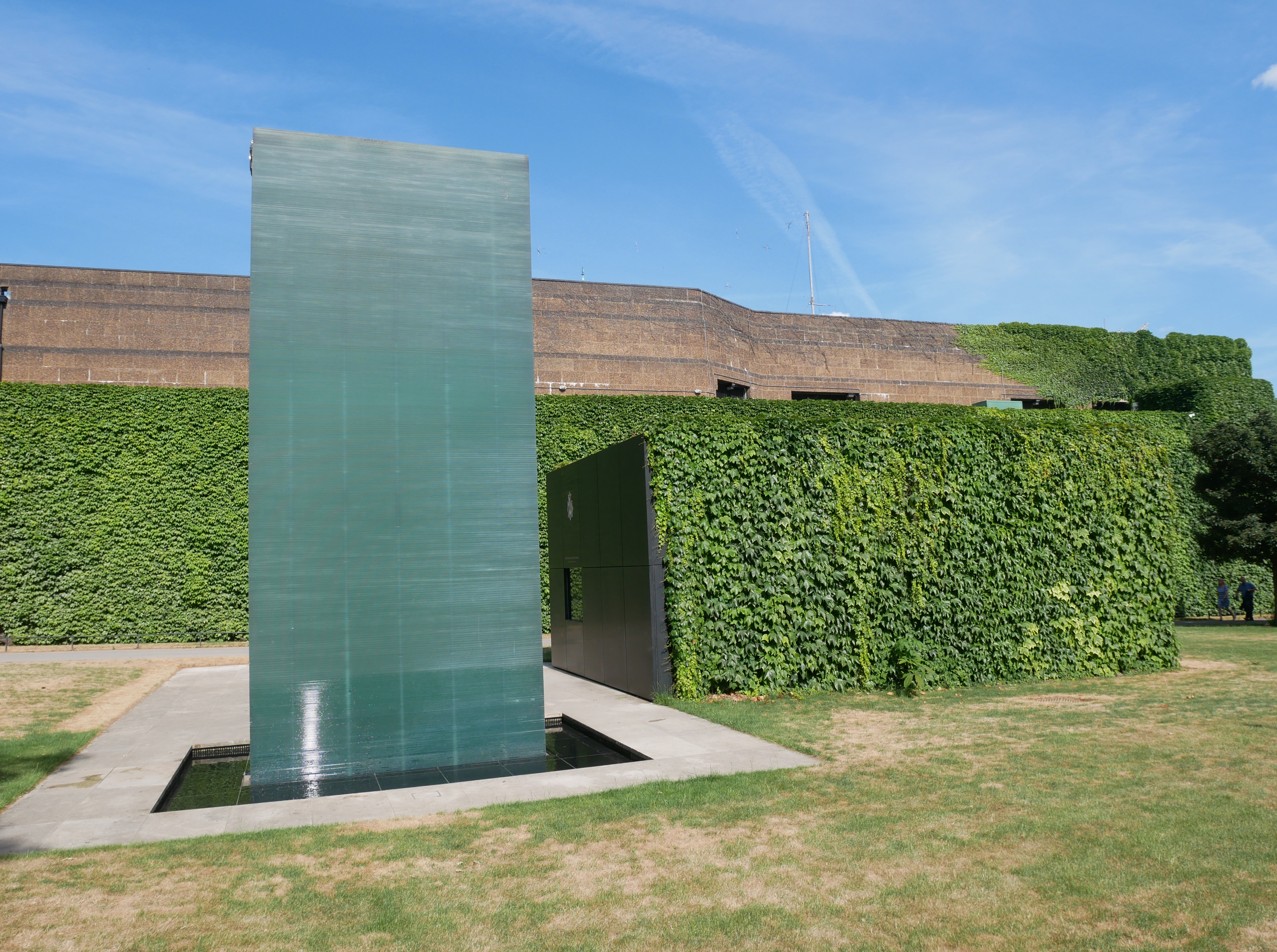
The west face of the memorial

On 22 July 2004, a symbolic groundbreaking ceremony took place on the site, performed by Prime Minister Tony Blair, Michael Winner, and officers from the Metropolitan Police and Greater Manchester Police, representing the two forces with the highest number of officers killed in the line of duty.

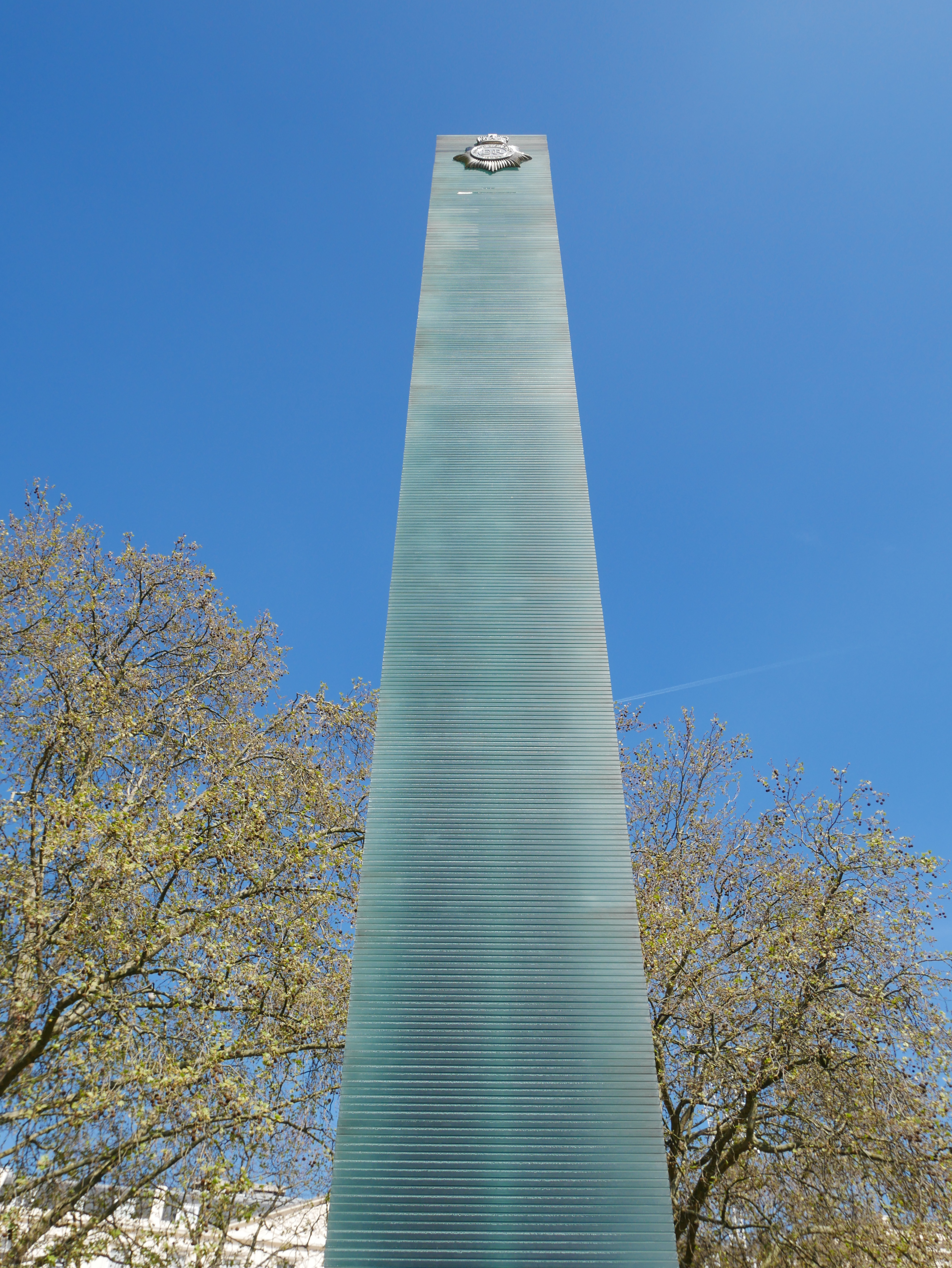
The south face of the blue glass column of the National Police Memorial

The memorial was formally unveiled on 26 April 2005 by Queen Elizabeth and Tony Blair. Michael Howard and Charles Kennedy, the leaders of the UK's other leading political parties at the time, were also present. A guard of honour was provided by 56 officers wearing the uniforms of each of the UK's police forces. The Queen stated that "It is surely appropriate that this should be positioned in The Mall - an area of London so often associated with our national way of life. When people pass by the memorial, I hope they will pause and reflect on the proud traditions that it represents. The courage and personal sacrifice recorded here will, I am certain, serve as an inspiration to us all."

Despite concerns over the potential cost, construction of the memorial eventually came in at £400,000 under budget, in part because a number of the contractors concerned carried out their work free of charge.

The memorial was a winner of the Royal Institute of British Architects award for 2006.

== Architectural elements ==
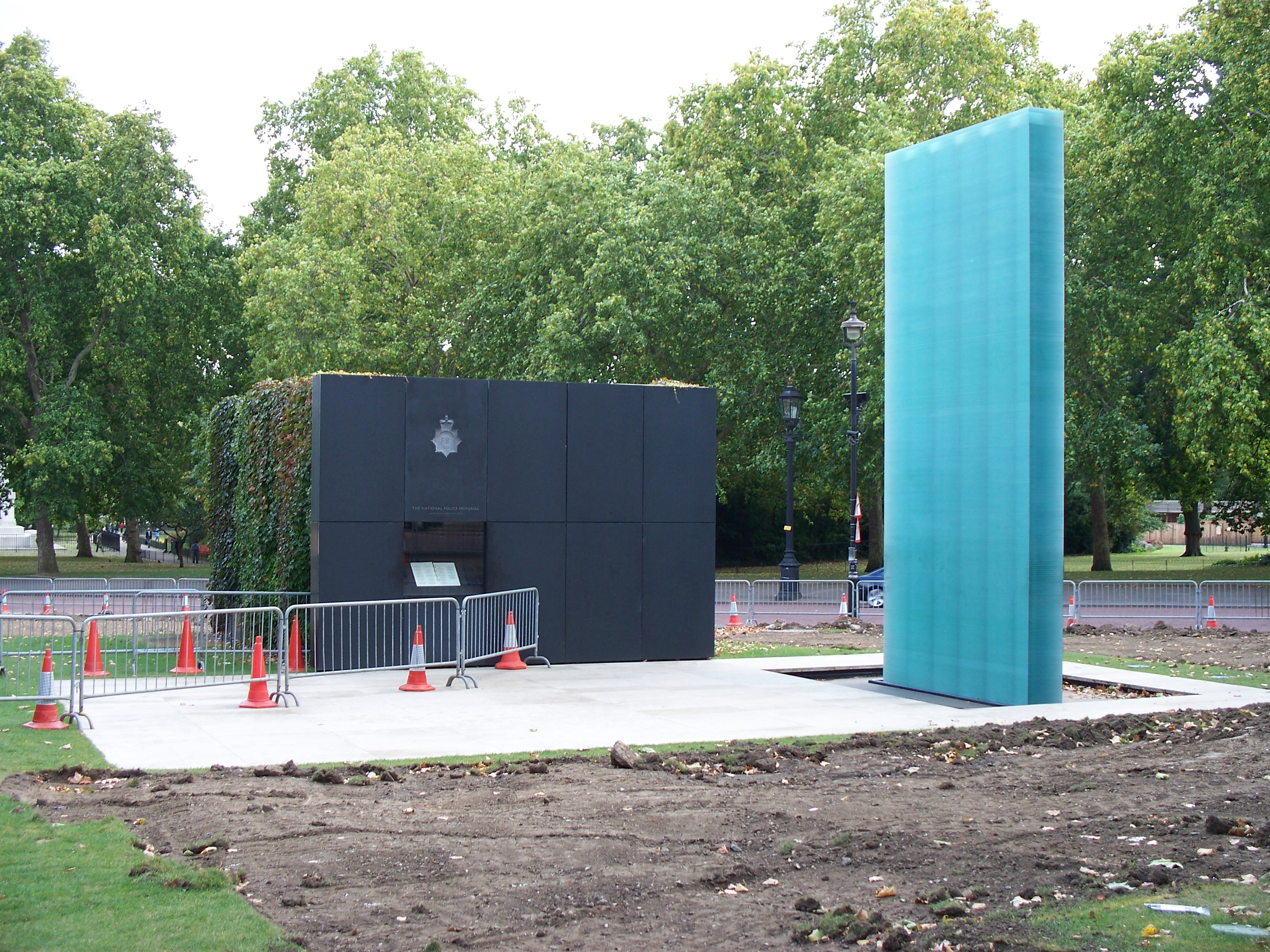
Repair work on the airshaft in 2007

The memorial consists of two distinct architectural elements, linked by a terrace of Purbeck stone. A black rectangular creeper-covered enclosure surrounds the air shaft, forming a single block. The northern face of the enclosure is kept free of creepers, and is inscribed with the police badge of office and the text "The National Police Memorial: Honouring Those Who Serve". This face also includes a vitrine in which the Roll of Honour is displayed.

Immediately north of the block, a glass column is sited in a reflecting pool. The column is internally illuminated by fibre optic cables with a faint blue light, symbolising the blue lamp which traditionally hangs outside police stations in the United Kingdom. The column is intended to screen the vitrine from passing traffic on The Mall. The column is 7.4 metres (24 ft) high, consisting of 622 stacked sheets of glass, a total surface area of 954 square metres (10,270 sq ft), weighing 28.6 tonnes.

== Roll of Honour ==
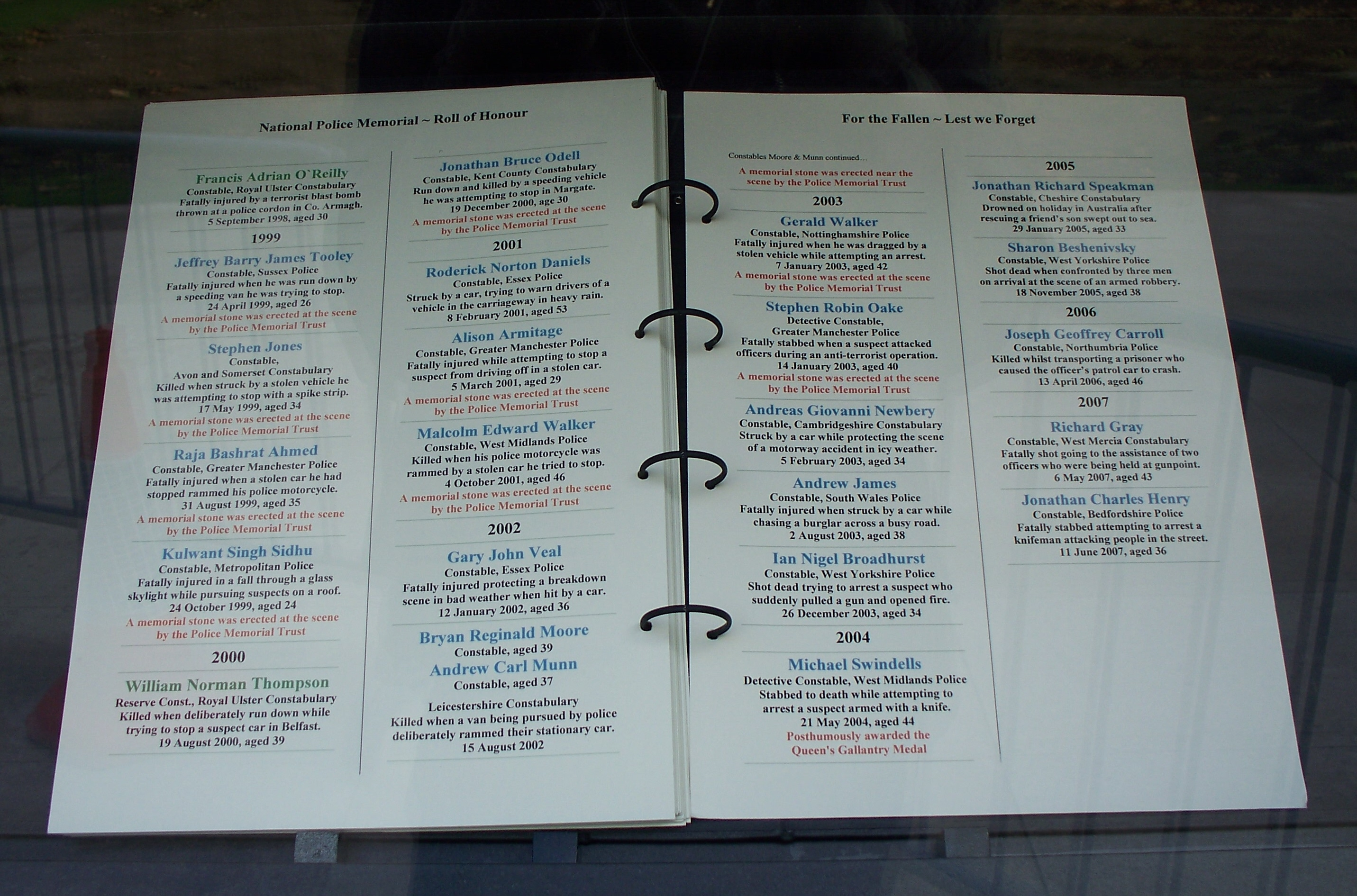
The Roll of Honour 1998-2007

The memorial contains the UK Police Roll of Honour behind a glass panel, containing the names of approximately 4,000 officers killed whilst on duty, in the course of effecting an arrest or whilst carrying out hazardous duties. The earliest entry is that of Watchman Isaac Smith, who died of injuries in 1680. The book is compiled from the approximately 4,000 names recorded by the Police Roll of Honour Trust, listing all officers who have died in the line of duty.

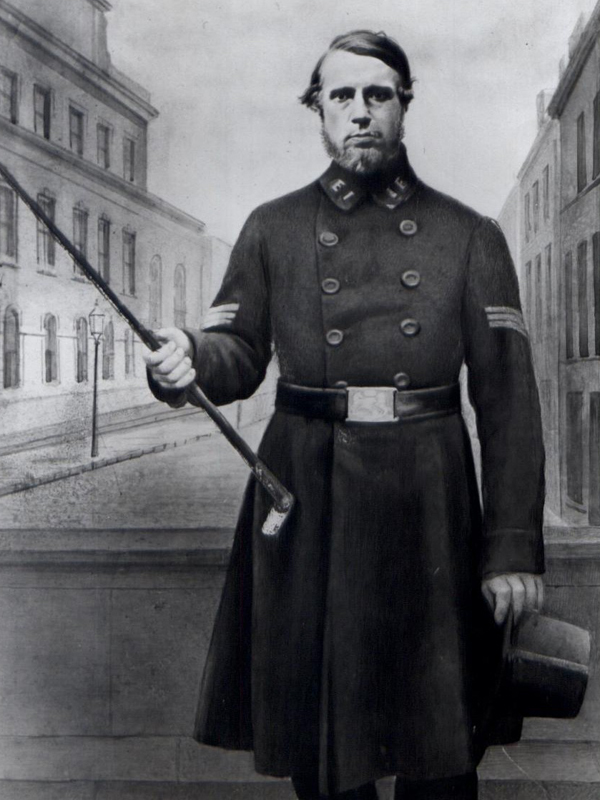
Manchester Police Sgt Charles Brent (1867)

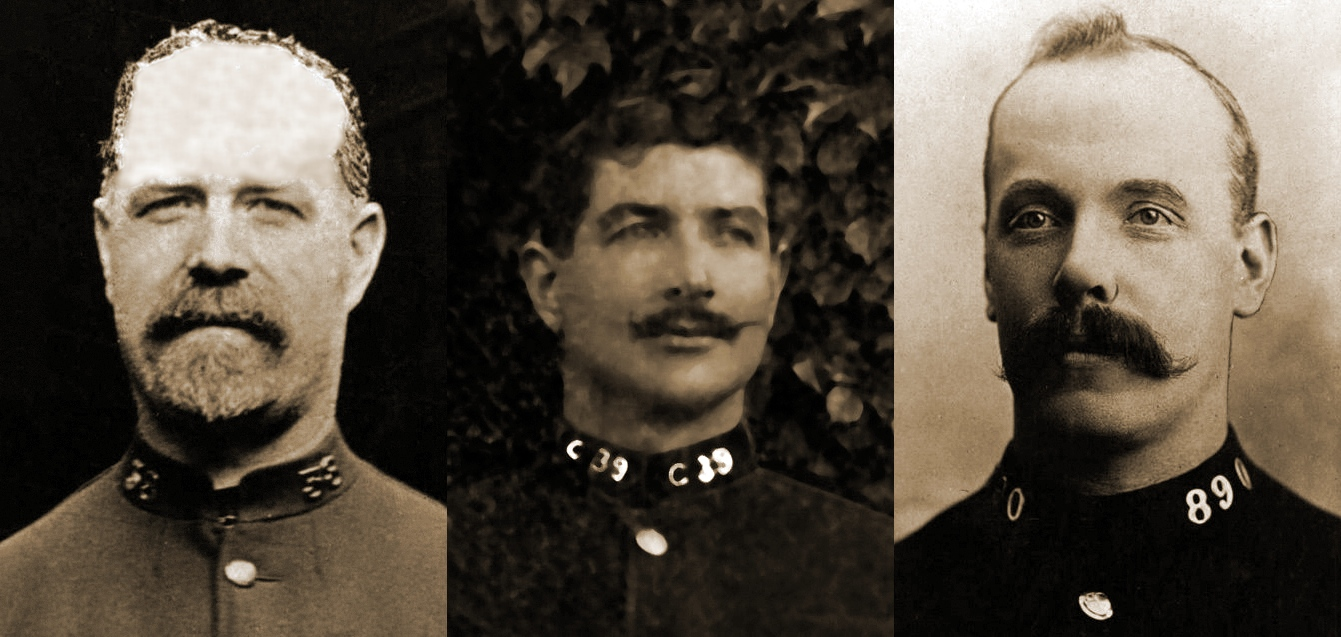
Sergeants Tucker and Bentley and PC Choate (1910)

== Criticism ==
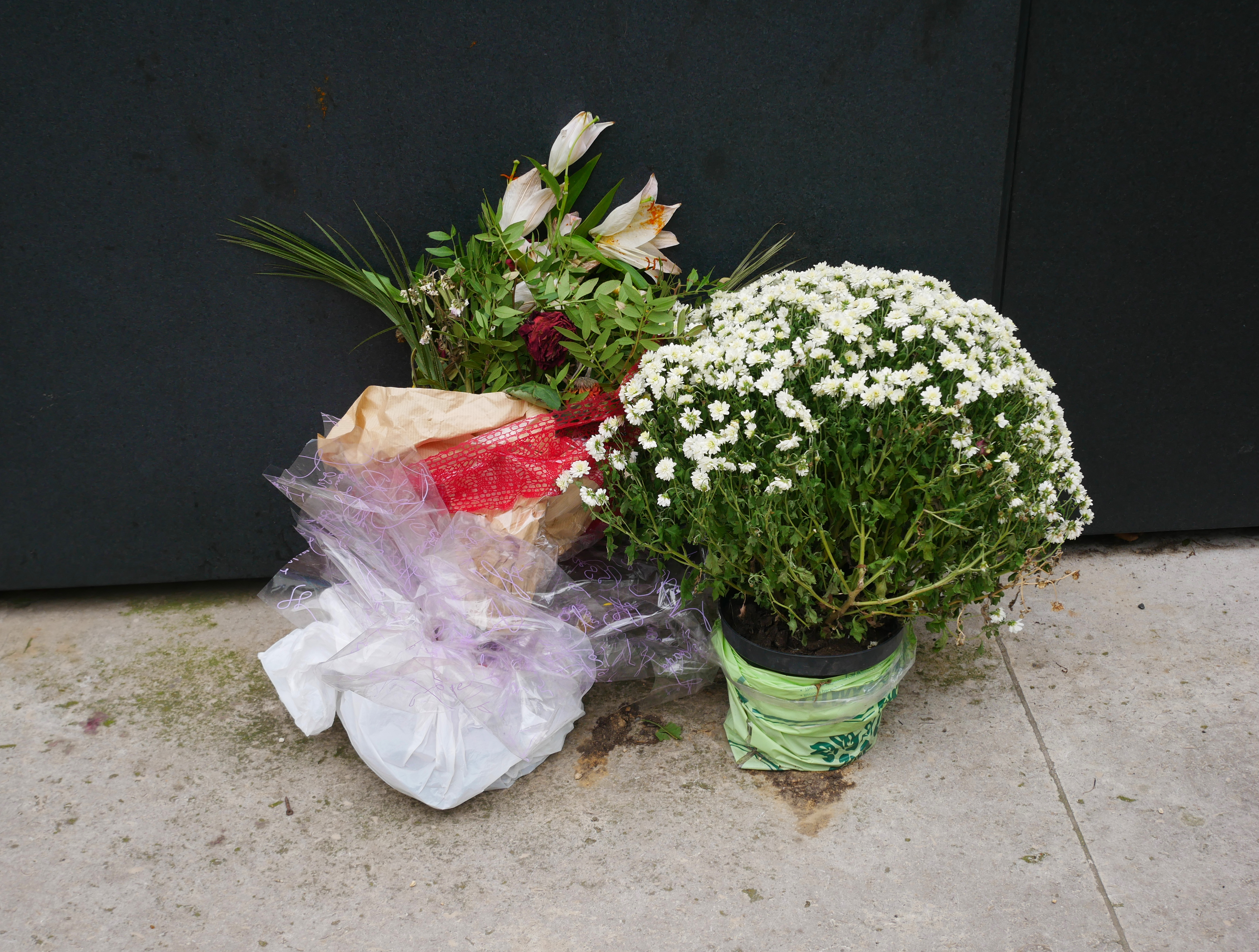
Flowers laid before the memorial

The memorial attracted criticism from some families of officers killed in the line of duty, regarding the high cost, and that the roll of honour lists only those officers killed during arrests or as a result of criminal acts, rather than all officers killed in the line of duty; also that, with the book being behind glass, friends and relatives of the deceased are not able to view the relevant page. Before construction, objections were also raised to the memorial's construction by the London Historical Parks Group and the local residents' association. Concern was also raised by some Irish republicans that the memorial includes the names of those RUC officers killed in The Troubles.
