= John Chambers College of Business and Economics =

Business school of West Virginia University

- Former names: WVU College of Commerce, College of Business and Economics
- Type: Public business school
- Established: 1951
- Affiliations: West Virginia University
- Dean: Joshua C. Hall
- Academic staff: 125
- Administrative staff: 90
- Students: 2,907 (Fall 2017)
- Undergraduates: 2,521 (Fall 2017)
- Location: Morgantown, West Virginia, USA (United States); 39°38′12″N 79°57′17″W
- Campus: Village
- Website: http://business.wvu.edu/

The John Chambers College of Business and Economics is the business school of West Virginia University, a state university located in Morgantown in the U.S. State of West Virginia. The college building is in the downtown campus of the university. The college offers ten undergraduate Bachelor of Science in Business Administration (BSBA) programs, two Bachelor programs in Economics, and one STEM-designated Bachelor of Science program in Supply Chain Management Science, seven master programs, and doctoral programs throughout its six departments.

== History ==
B&E Building as seen from University Avenue

The College of Business and Economics traces its origins to the late 1940s when it awarded business administration degrees under College of Arts and Sciences. The WVU College of Commerce was created by an order of the state higher education board in November, 1951, with the first students enrolled for the first semester of the 1952-53 academic year. In 1954, the college was accredited by the American Assembly of Collegiate Schools of Business. In 1957 the Master of Science in Industrial Relations was the first master's degree program in the college. The first Ph.D. program was established in 1965 in economics. In 1971, the College of Commerce was renamed the College of Business and Economics.

In 2018, the college was renamed the John Chambers College of Business and Economics, after the two-time WVU alumnus and chairman emeritus of Cisco. It was renamed for Chambers, Cisco's former CEO, to help WVU support entrepreneurs and start-up businesses.

== Academic programs ==
The college offers the following undergraduate, graduate, and doctoral programs:

=== Undergraduate programs ===
- Accounting
- Economics
- Entrepreneurship & Innovation
- Finance
- General Business
- Hospitality and Tourism Management
- Management
- Management Information Systems
- Marketing
- Organizational Leadership
- Supply Chain Management
- Supply Chain Management Science (STEM)

=== Graduate programs ===
The College of Business and Economics offers eight masters programs and one certificate program:

- MBA
- Executive MBA (online)
- MS-Business Data Analytics (BUDA; online)
- MS-Business Cybersecurity (CYBR; online)
- MS-Economics (MSE; online)
- MS-Finance
- MS-Industrial Relations
- Master of Accountancy (MAcc)
- MS-Forensic and Fraud Examination (FFE; online)
- Graduate Certificate in Forensic Accounting and Fraud Examination (FAFE)

In addition, the College of Business and Economics offers MBA Dual degrees:

- MBA plus Master of Science in Industrial Relations (2 years)
- MBA plus Master of Science in Finance (2 years)
- MBA plus Master of Science in Sport Management (2 years)
- MBA plus Juris Doctor (3 years)

=== Doctoral programs ===
The College of Business and Economics offers Ph.D. Economics and a Ph.D. in business administration programs with concentrations in accounting, finance, management, and marketing. The school additionally offers a Doctorate of Business Administration with concentrations in Marketing, Management, Economics, and Accounting.

== Student organizations ==
The B&E has several student organizations or clubs for students to participate in. Examples include:

- Accounting Club
- American Marketing Association
- Alpha Kappa Psi
- Beta Alpha Psi
- Beta Gamma Sigma
- Business Ethics Club
- Delta Sigma Pi
- Entrepreneurship Club
- Hospitality Club
- Industrial Relations Student Association
- Management Information Systems Association (MISA)
- Society for Human Resource Management (SHRM)
- Thompson Economics Club
- WVU Finance Club

== Experiential Learning and Centers ==
The college is committed to disseminating its research, expertise, and know-how to the region and to society at large. The college is home to the following centers. These centers include:

- Encova Center for Innovation and Entrepreneurship
- Bureau of Business and Economic Research
- Business Learning Resource Center
- Bernie Wehrle Global Supply Chain Laboratory
- Center for Career Development
- Center for Chinese Business
- Center for Executive Education
- Center for Free Enterprise
- Forensic Business Studies
- Data Driven WV
- Stuart M. and Joyce N. Robbins Center for Global Business and Strategy
- Crime Scene Complex for FAFE Program
- Knee Regulatory Research Center

== Rankings ==
West Virginia University was ranked #241 in 2021 under the USNews. The Business school was unranked.
