= John T. Chambers =

American businessman

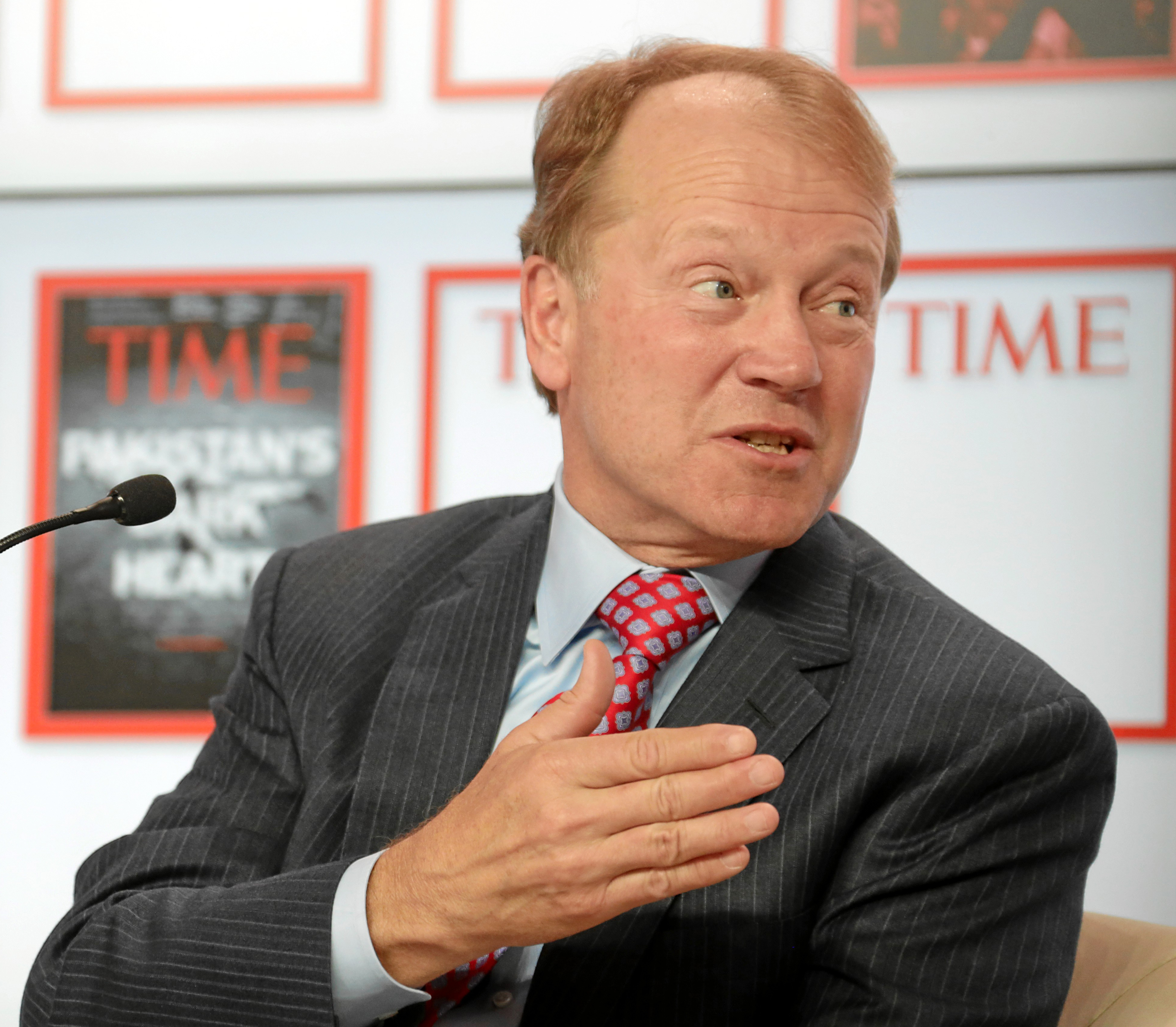
- Born: John Thomas Chambers; August 23, 1949 (age 76); Cleveland, Ohio, U.S.
- Education: Duke University; West Virginia University (BS, BA, JD); Indiana University, Bloomington (MBA)
- Occupations: Executive Chairman, Cisco Systems
- Political party: Republican
- Spouse: Elaine Chambers
- Children: 2
- Awards: Padma Bhushan 2019
- Website: LinkedIn profile

John Thomas Chambers (born August 23, 1949) is the former executive chairman and CEO of Cisco Systems.

== Early life ==
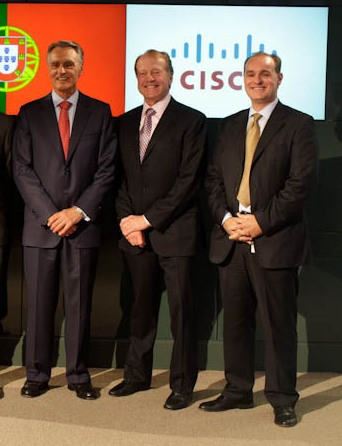
President Aníbal Cavaco Silva of Portugal (left), Chambers (center), and Helder Antunes (right); 2011.

His mother was a psychiatrist and his father was an obstetrician. The family resided in Kanawha City, Charleston.

When Chambers was nine years old, he was diagnosed with dyslexia. Aided by a therapist, Chambers learned to cope with his disability.

== Education ==
He holds a Bachelor of Science and Bachelor of Arts degree in business and a Juris Doctor from West Virginia University and a master of business administration from Kelley School of Business. Previously, he also attended the Edmund T. Pratt Jr. School of Engineering from 1967 to 1968.

== Career ==
After obtaining his MBA, Chambers began his career in technology sales at IBM 1976–1983 when he was 27 years old. At 34 years old, in 1983, Chambers joined Wang Laboratories, later becoming Vice President of US Operations in 1987. During Chambers' time at the company, Wang's profits declined dramatically from $2 billion 1989 to a $700 million loss in 1990. A year later, Chambers left Wang to join Cisco, which had gone public on February 16, 1990.

In 1995 Chambers became CEO of Cisco, a position he held until 2015. He had also been promoted to board chairman in 2006. During his tenure as CEO, the company's annual sales grew from $1.9 billion to $49.2 billion. On July 27, 2015, Chuck Robbins replaced Chambers as CEO of Cisco Systems. Following his tenure as CEO, Chambers remained on the board until 2017, when he retired from the company. In October 2016, he was reported to own over 1.7 million Cisco shares worth approximately US$54 million. He holds the honorary title of Chairman Emeritus but holds no authority within the company.

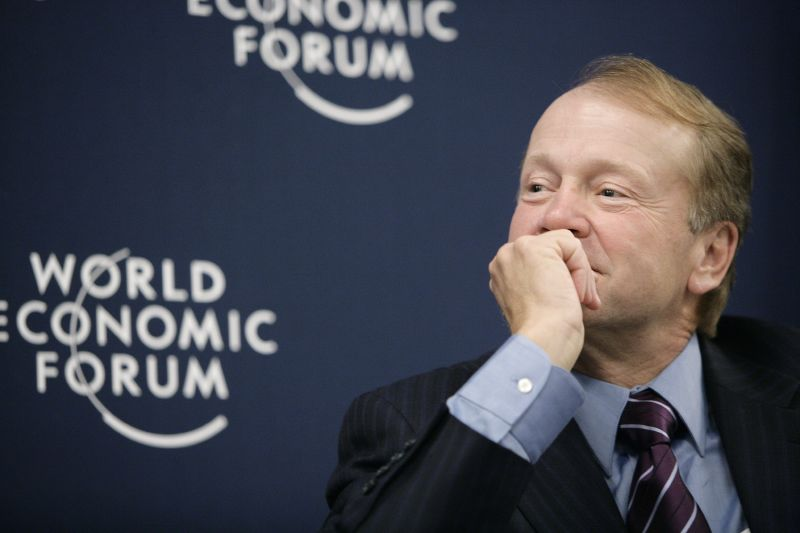
Chambers at the World Economic Forum (2007).

In early 2021, Chambers became a member of the board of directors of Quantum Metric, a software company based in Colorado Springs.

John Chambers was chairman of the Board of Pensando. Chambers served on the board of directors of myCFO.

== Personal ==
Chambers and his wife Elaine have two children, Lindsay and John.

== Political contributions ==
Chambers has made political donations totaling over $180,000 to the Democratic Party and over $1,000,000 to the Republican Party. He served as a co-chair in Republican John McCain's 2008 presidential bid.

Since 2010, Chambers has also served as a commissioner for the Broadband Commission for Digital Development, which leverages broadband technologies as a key enabler for social and economic development.

== West Virginia University ==
On November 9, 2018, the College of Business and Economics at West Virginia University was renamed the John Chambers College of Business and Economics.

== Awards ==
Chambers has received various awards and honors for corporate philanthropy.

- CNN's Top 25 Most Powerful People
- Time Magazine's "100 Most Influential People"
- Clinton Global Citizen Award
- U.S. State Department Top Corporate Social Responsibility Award
- Woodrow Wilson Award for Corporate Citizenship
- 2009 Silicon Valley Education Foundation Pioneer Business Leader Award
- 2012 Franklin Institute's Bower Award for Business Leadership
- 2015 Harvard Business Review: The 100 Best-Performing CEOs in the World
- In 2016, John Chambers was honored with an Edison Achievement Award for his commitment to innovation throughout his career.

== Compensation ==
- 2014 – Total compensation of $16,488,184, which included a base salary of $1,100,000, a cash bonus of $2,500,000, stocks granted of $12,876,709, and other compensation worth $11,475.
- 2013 – Total compensation of $21,049,501, which included a base salary of $1,100,000, a cash bonus of $4,700,080, stocks granted of $15,237,652, and other compensation worth $11,769.
- 2012 – Total compensation of $11,687,666, which included a base salary of $375,000, a cash bonus of $3,953,376, stocks granted of $7,348,265, and other compensation worth $11,025.
- 2011 – Total compensation of $12,890,829 which included a base salary of $375,000, no cash bonus, stocks granted of $12,500,100, and other compensation worth $11,025.
- 2009 – Total compensation of $12,788,498, which included a base salary of $375,000, a cash bonus of $2,031,000, stocks granted of $10,372,500, and other compensation worth $9,998.
- 2008 – Total compensation of $18,767,149, which included a base salary of $375,000, a cash bonus of $3,002,802, stocks granted of $6,442,000, and options granted of $8,938,260.
- 2007 – Total compensation of $12,801,773, which included a base salary of $350,096, a cash bonus of $3,500,000 and options granted of $8,944,000.

== Published books by Chambers ==
Chambers has published a book about his management and leadership style.

- Connecting the Dots: Lessons for Leadership in a Startup World (Chambers, John, Hachette, 2018) ISBN 9780316486545
