= Anthony Smith =

Anthony Smith may refer to:

== Sports ==
- Anthony Smith (basketball) (born 1997), American basketball player
- Anthony Smith (cricketer) (1930−2018), English cricketer
- Anthony Smith (fighter) (born 1988), American mixed martial artist
- Anthony Smith (Australian footballer) (born 1951), Australian rules footballer
- Anthony Smith (defensive end, born 1967), American football player convicted of murder
- Anthony Smith (defensive end, born 2004), American football player
- Anthony Smith (safety) (born 1983), American football player
- Anthony Smith (wide receiver) (born 2002), American football player

== Entertainment ==
- Anthony Smith (producer) (1938–2021), British broadcaster, author and academic
- Anthony Smith (sculptor) (born 1984), British sculptor
- Anthony Smith (singer) (born 1942), American country music singer
- Anthony Neil Smith, American mystery and crime fiction writer

== Politics ==
- Anthony Smith (American politician) (1844–?), senator from West Virginia
- Anthony Charles Smith (born 1950), Liberal Party of Australia politician
- Anthony Thomas Smith (1935–2017), British lawyer and Liberal Party politician
- Anthony Smith (Antiguan politician), member of the House of Representatives of Antigua and Barbuda
- Anthony Smith (French politician) (born 1975), member of the European Parliament

== Other ==
- Anthony Preston Smith, American horticulturalist and California pioneer
- Anthony Smith (explorer) (1926–2014), British science writer and balloonist, RAF pilot
- Anthony Smith (rescuer) (1894–1964), George Cross recipient for civilian action in WWII
- Anthony D. Smith (1939–2016), British sociologist
- Tone Loc (born 1966), American musician, birth name Anthony Terrell Smith
- Anthony Lamar Smith, an American man who was killed by a police officer in 2011; see killing of Anthony Lamar Smith
- Anthony Smith (born 2008), American hearing-impaired 4-year old comic book fan; see Blue Ear
- Antony Smith, a murdered Canadian gang member of the Dixon City Bloods gang; see timeline of Rob Ford video scandal
- Tony Hudgell (born 2014), a charity fundraiser, birthname Antony Smith

== See also ==
- Tony Smith (disambiguation)
- Antonio Smith (disambiguation)
- List of people with surname Smith
- Anthony Smyth, one of the Florida Four involved in gun smuggling
