= Tony Smith =

Tony Smith may refer to:

== Sportsmen ==
- Tony Smith (American football) (born 1970), former professional American football player who played running back for the Atlanta Falcons
- Tony Smith (footballer, born 1952), Australian rules football player for Carlton
- Tony Smith (footballer, born 1966), Australian rules football player for Sydney
- Tony Smith (baseball) (1884–1965), player for the Brooklyn Superbas and Washington Senators
- Tony Smith (basketball) (born 1968), retired American professional basketball player
- Tony Smith (South African cricketer) (born 1951)
- Tony Smith (English cricketer) (born 1961)
- Tony Smith (rugby league, born 1967), Australian rugby league footballer and coach
- Tony Smith (rugby league, born 1970), English rugby league footballer and coach
- Tony Smith (footballer, born 1957), football defender who played for Peterborough, Halifax and Hartlepool
- Tony Smith (footballer, born 1973), Scottish-born footballer who played for Airdrieonians and Dundee Utd
- Tony Smith (speed skater) (born 1961), New Zealand speed skater

== Politicians ==
- Tony Smith (Queensland politician) (born 1950), member of the Australian House of Representatives, 1996–1998
- Tony Smith (Victorian politician) (born 1967), former Speaker of the Australian House of Representatives
- Tony Smith (Mississippi politician) (born 1962), member of the Mississippi State Senate

== Other people ==
- Tony Smith (philosopher), (born 1951), American philosopher
- Tony Smith (sculptor) (1912–1980), American sculptor, visual artist, and art theorist
- Tony Smith (band manager) (born 1945), British music manager
- Tony Smith (civil servant) (born 1953), British civil servant
- Tony Thunder Smith, American drummer
- Tony Dean Smith (born 1977), screenwriter, director and editor
- Tony Stratton Smith (1933–1987), English music manager, entrepreneur and founder of Charisma Records

== Fictional characters ==
- Tony Smith (East Enders), fictional character on the British soap opera EastEnders

== See also ==
- Anthony Smith (disambiguation)
- Antonio Smith (disambiguation)
