= Elizabeth Neville =

Elizabeth Neville may refer to:

- Elizabeth Neville (police officer) (born 1953), former chief constable of Wiltshire
- Elizabeth Danvers née Neville, later Carey, (1545/50–1630), English noblewoman
- Elizabeth Nevill, 3rd Baroness Bergavenny (1415–1448), also spelled Neville, née Beauchamp
- Elizabeth Neville (died 1621) née Bacon, Lady Neville, later Lady Periam, English noblewoman, third wife of Sir Henry Neville
