= Sussex Police =

English territorial police force

Agency overview
- Formed: 1 January 1968; 58 years ago
- Employees: 5,477
- Volunteers: 199
- Annual budget: £328.9 million (2021/22)

Jurisdictional structure
- Operations jurisdiction: East and West Sussex, United Kingdom
- Map of Sussex Police area
- Area: 3,783 km^{2} (1,461 sq mi)
- Population: 1.7 million
- Legal jurisdiction: England & Wales
- Constituting instrument: Police Act 1996
- General nature: Local civilian police

Operational structure
- Overseen by: His Majesty's Inspectorate of Constabulary and Fire & Rescue Services; Independent Office for Police Conduct
- Headquarters: Lewes, East Sussex
- Constables: 3,017 (including 106 special constables) (March 2022)
- Police Community Support Officers: 268 (March 2022)
- Police and Crime Commissioner responsible: Katy Bourne (C)
- Agency executive: Jo Shiner, Chief Constable
- Divisions: 3

Facilities
- Stations: 40 (6 of which contain custody suites)

Website
- www.sussex.police.uk

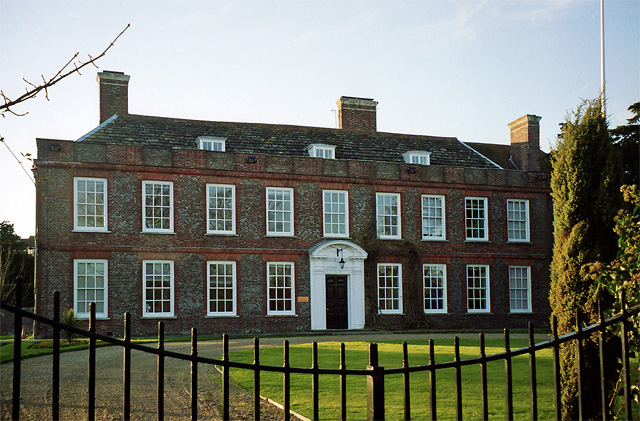
Malling House, Lewes, a Grade I listed building.

Sussex Police are the territorial police force responsible for policing the ceremonial counties of East Sussex and West Sussex in South East England. Their headquarters are in Malling House, Lewes, East Sussex.

== History ==
Policing in Sussex can be traced back to Brighton Borough Police, established in 1830.

A few years later on 13 March 1844, Chief Constable Henry Solomon was murdered in his office by a detainee he was interviewing. He is believed to be the only chief police officer to have suffered such a fate.

Prior to 1830 local watchmen were appointed to provide some degree of law enforcement in the area.

In 1812, there were some 12 watchmen who were responsible for the town. By 1814 the number had grown to 28 and at this time the title of constable was in use for them.

By 1868 the force had grown to 100 officers and helmets replaced top hats.

In 1918, the first woman was appointed as a police officer in this force.

By 1930, it had grown to 216 officers.

On 14 September 1933, Brighton Borough Police were the first force to introduce police radios.

Forces were established at various times for the counties of East Sussex and West Sussex, as well as separate forces in the boroughs of Brighton, Hove, Eastbourne and Hastings.

In April 1943, in order to provide a co-ordinated approach to the wartime emergency, these forces were amalgamated to form the Sussex Combined Police, with headquarters at Haywards Heath.

In April 1947, with the exception of Hove, policing reverted to the old system for another two decades. Hove remained part of East Sussex Constabulary.

On 1 January 1968, Sussex Constabulary was created from the amalgamation of Brighton Borough Police, Eastbourne Borough Police, Hastings Borough Police, West Sussex Constabulary and East Sussex Constabulary. In 1974, the amalgamated forces became Sussex Police.

=== Chief constables ===
Brighton Constabulary

- Henry Solomon appointed 18 May 1838 (murdered in 1844 by prisoner)
- Thomas Hayter Chase appointed 22 May 1844
- George White appointed 21 December 1853
- Owen Crowhurst appointed 7 December 1876
- Isaiah Barnden appointed 8 August 1877
- James Terry appointed 6 April 1881
- Thomas Carter appointed 27 January 1894
- Sir William Gentle appointed 26 September 1901
- Charles Griffin appointed 5 June 1920
- William James Hutchinson appointed 1 December 1933
- Charles Field Williams Ridge appointed 1 July 1956
- Albert Edgar Rowsell appointed 28 October 1957
- William Thomas Cavey appointed 8 October 1963
- Brighton amalgamated with East Sussex Constabulary, West Sussex Constabulary, Hastings and Eastbourne Constabularies to form Sussex Constabulary, 1968

Sussex Constabulary

- 1968–1972: Thomas Christopher Williams (died 9 September 1972)
- 1973–1983: George Terry
- 1983–1993: Roger Birch
- 1993–2001: Paul Chapple Whitehouse
- 2001–2006: Kenneth Lloyd Jones
- 2006–2007: Joseph Edwards
- 2008–2014: Martin Richards
- 2014–2020: Giles York
- 2020–present: Jo Shiner

=== Sussex Police Roll of Honour ===
The Police Roll of Honour Trust and Police Memorial Trust list and commemorate all British police officers killed in the line of duty. Since its establishment in 1984, the Police Memorial Trust has erected 50 memorials nationally to some of those officers. A list of officers of Sussex Police and its predecessors who died on duty (in progress) is shown below:

Name	Rank	Age	Force	Date of death	Circumstances
William James Avis	Sgt	47	West Sussex Constabulary	26 February 1942	Shot.
Arthur Walls	Insp	44	Eastbourne Borough Police	9 October 1912	Shot.
Jeffrey Barry James Tooley	PC	26	Sussex Police	24 April 1999	Fatally injured by a speeding van, which failed to stop at a road check.
Henry Solomon	CC	50	Brighton Borough Police	14 March 1844	Bludgeoned with poker.
Thomas Rowles	PC	47	Parish of Brighthelmstone	6 November 1817	Fatally wounded when accidentally bayoneted by the military during a riot.
Albert Edward Craig	PC	31	Brighton Borough Police	16 November 1940	Fatally injured in a collision with a motor lorry while cycling to duty.
Lawrence Holford	WRC	48	Brighton Borough Police	30 April 1941	Killed on duty as two allied aircraft collided and he was hit by debris.
Harold Stone	WRC	40	Brighton Borough Police	18 December 1942	Killed by enemy action whilst on duty during an enemy air raid.
Frank William Barker	PC	33	Brighton Borough Police	25 May 1943	Killed in an enemy air raid after moving a party of children to safety.
Kenneth Grinstead	PC	31	Brighton Borough Police	25 May 1943	Killed by enemy action whilst on duty during an enemy air raid.
Arthur Frederick Yerrill	PC	57	Brighton Borough Police	5 October 1951	Fatally injured when he fell alighting from a bus while reporting for duty.
Dennis John Owens	Sgt	37	Eastbourne Borough Police	26 October 1940	Killed dealing with an unexploded bomb following an enemy air raid.
Nelson Oliver Hugh Kemp	SPC	33	Hastings Borough Police	26 September 1940	Killed in an enemy air raid, duty status unknown.
John King	PC	38	Hastings Borough Police	1 July 1955	Collapsed and died at St. Leonards shortly after reporting for night duty.

Key to rank abbreviations: A/x = Acting • CC = Chief Constable • ACC = Assistant Chief Constable • CEO = Civilian Explosives Officer • Cmdr = Commander • DC = Detective Constable • DI = Detective Inspector • DS = Detective Sergeant • Insp = Inspector • PC = Police Constable • Sgt = Sergeant • SPC = Special Police Constable • Stn Sgt = Station Sergeant • Supt = Superintendent • WPC = Woman Police Constable • WRC = War Reserve Constable.

=== Old Police Cells Museum ===
Opened on 4 May 2005 by Councillor Pat Drake, the then mayor of Brighton & Hove, the Old Police Cells Museum is located in the basement of Brighton Town Hall and offers an educational and entertaining insight into the history of policing within Sussex.

It provides an opportunity to visit Brighton Borough main police station for the period 1830 to 1965 and learn about the murder of Chief Constable Henry Solomon in 1844 by a prisoner. It is possible to view the old cells with their graffiti from the mods and rockers era, police memorabilia and artifacts. The museum also houses a unique collection of truncheons and tipstaffs, one of the largest in the country. This collection was made by Alderman Caffyn throughout his lifetime and is on permanent loan to the Museum from the Sussex Police Authority.

== Organisation ==
Sussex Police is commanded by Chief Constable Jo Shiner.

The remainder of the command team consists of Deputy Chief Constable Dave McLaren, Assistant Chief Constable Paul Court, Assistant Chief Constable Peter Gardner and Assistant Chief Constable Stephen Rayland.

Also forming part of the command team are the assistant chief officer, the director of finance and chief information officer although these roles are filled by civilian members of staff.

The force consists of three divisions, each being led by a chief superintendent: West Sussex, East Sussex, and Brighton & Hove.

Divisions are sub-divided into districts, each led by a chief inspector, providing a local identity for policing. These districts are Chichester, Arun, Horsham, Adur & Worthing, Crawley, Mid Sussex, Brighton & Hove, Wealden, Lewes, Eastbourne, Rother and Hastings.

Sussex Police is also responsible for policing Gatwick Airport.

Districts are further divided into Neighbourhood Policing Teams (NPT), each led by an inspector.

=== Neighbourhood Policing Teams ===
The NPTs are responsible for the bulk of the community work undertaken in an area, and look to deal with long term local issues including anti-social behaviour.

Their role stems from the traditional view of 'bobbies on the beat' with police community support officers (PCSOs) providing a high visibility profile on the street, albeit with limited policing powers.

Special constables also serve alongside various teams including NRT, Prevention and on specialist teams such as RPU and Dogs units; they have full police powers when on duty.

=== Neighbourhood Response Teams ===
Police response is covered by Neighbourhood Response Teams (NRT) operating from a number of "hub" stations across the area and providing the initial response to most emergency and prompt attendance calls.

These teams are led locally by a sergeant and overall they are managed by an inspector. These teams work 24 hours a day, seven days a week, 365 days a year.

Secondary investigation of crime not dealt with by specialist teams – for example CID – is managed by Response Investigation Teams (RIT) who work closely with the NRT.

The force has a total of six custody suites located around the force area for the detention of arrested persons. They are located in Brighton with 36 cells, Crawley with 27 cells, Eastbourne with 22 cells, Hastings with 10 cells, Worthing with 19 cells, and Chichester with 19 cells.

Sussex Police officer and staff numbers:
	2007/08	2008/09	2009/10	2010/11	2011/12	2012/13	2013/14	2014/15	2015/16	2016/17
Police officers	3,075	3,196	3,213	3,102	2,959	2,847	2,805	2,810	2,666	2,587
Special constables	199	216	240	293	348	350	366	393	387	301
PCSOs	372	399	377	351	335	358	349	325	249	180
Police staff	1,974	2,080	2,139	1,949	1,881	1,911	1,941	1,837	1,831	1,831

== Police and Crime Commissioner ==
Oversight of Sussex Police was provided by Sussex Police Authority until November 2012, when this role was taken over by a police and crime commissioner following the first elections.

Katy Bourne was elected police and crime commissioner for Sussex Police on 15 November 2012, with a majority of 24,426.

The police and crime commissioner is scrutinised by the Sussex Police and Crime Panel, made up of elected councillors from the local authorities in the police area.

Sussex Police Authority had nine councillors (drawn from the three councils), three justices of the peace and five independent members.

== Specialist units ==
=== Air Support Unit ===
Police aviation is now provided across England and Wales by the National Police Air Service (NPAS).

Prior to the establishment of NPAS in 2012, Sussex Police used to operate an MD-902 helicopter, callsign Hotel 900 jointly with the South East Coast Ambulance Service, providing both policing and emergency medical support to Sussex and beyond.

The closest NPAS base to Sussex Police is at Redhill Aerodrome in neighbouring Surrey. The helicopter's call-sign is NPAS 15 and it has a registration of G-CPAS. This aircraft was previously used by Cleveland Police until NPAS was formed.

=== Counter-terrorism ===
Sussex Police has a dedicated Counter-Terrorist Intelligence Unit (CTIU) which works alongside the rest of the force in protecting and reassuring the public, and reducing the risk from terrorism.

The unit engages with communities, local authorities, higher education and universities and other local bodies, in order to prevent violent extremism. The unit also offers specialist protective security advice to locations deemed to be at a greater risk from terrorism.

The CTIU is involved in the disruption and detection of terrorist activity and has close links between local police and the communities it serves. It also works at ports and airports alongside Border Force

=== Dog Support Unit ===
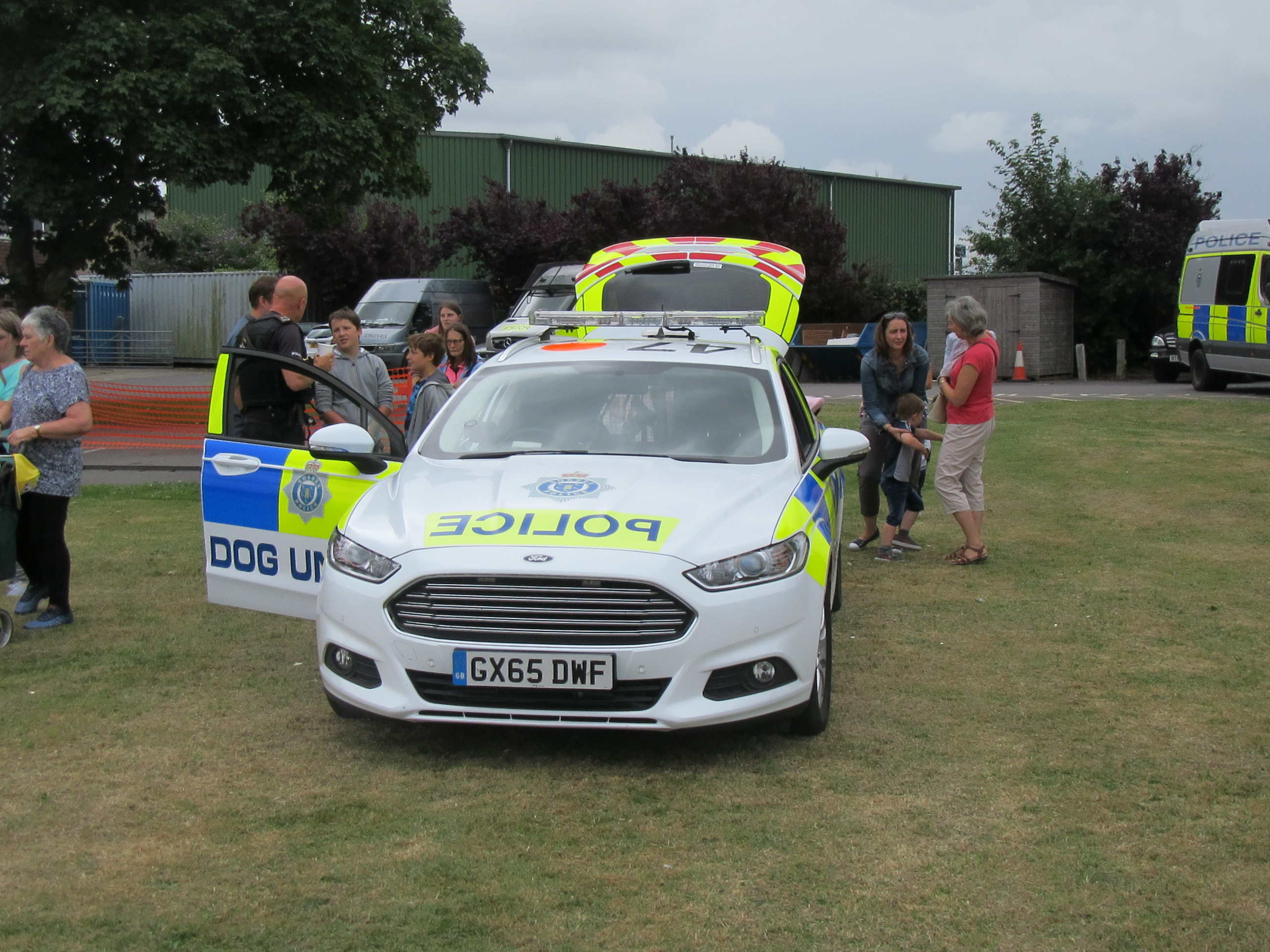
A Ford Mondeo of Sussex DSU at Chichester

The Sussex police have a Dog Support Unit that tracks, chases and detains suspects, searches for stolen property and missing people, and assists public order units with crowd control.

Specialist search dogs are used to recover drugs, casg and weapons; detect explosives; and follow the scent of a specific person. Dog handlers are also trained to deal with dangerous dogs.

=== Rural Crime Team ===
The Rural Crime Team, based out of Heathfield and Midhurst, are primarily responsible for policing the less built up areas. They will handle any rural forms of crime, from hunting and agricultural crimes and thefts of agricultural equipment etc. They work hand in hand with the Environment Agency as well as the National Wildlife Crime Unit. The team is headed up by an inspector who is supported by 3 sergeants. Unlike most other specialised unit, the rural crime team employes Police Community Support Officers (PCSOs) as well as police officers.

=== Emergency & Operations Planning ===
The Emergency and Planning Team provides Sussex Police with the ability to plan for major incidents, natural disasters and large policing operations that occur throughout the communities of Sussex.

The team delivers specialist equipment to front line officers, staff for operations and tactical advice to police commanders; this helps to deliver the best service possible to the public during critical times.

The team also has responsibilities with regards to business continuity, local resilience partnership working and contingency planning.

=== Roads Policing Unit (RPU) ===
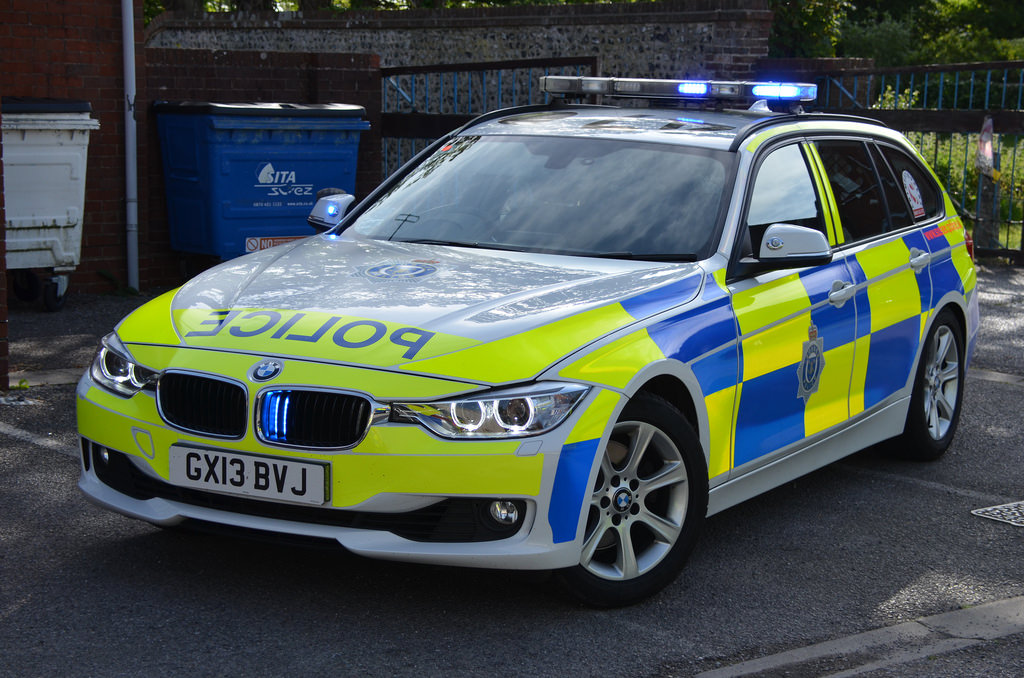
BMW 3 Series Road Policing Unit

The Road Policing Unit (RPU) covers the whole force from three bases. Those bases include Sussex Police HQ (Lewes), Arundel and Bexhill.

The primary aims of RPU are to deny criminals the use of the road, tackle anti-social driving such as mobile phone use and drink-driving and to bring down the number of KSI (killed and seriously injured) casualties on the roads of Sussex.

Vehicles in use include fully marked and unmarked vehicles of various types fitted with covert warning equipment.

=== Specialist Enforcement Unit (SEU) ===
The SEU was formed on 26 January 2021 with the sole task of denying criminals the use of the roads, particularly car crime such as car theft and ‘county line’ drug smuggling between counties. It differs from the RPU as it targets these specific areas.

=== Tactical Enforcement Unit (TEU) ===
The TEU was formed in 2021, tasked with targeting violent and high level offenders throughout the two counties of West Sussex and East Sussex. The unit specialises in method of entry, as well as proactive policing approaches to capturing these offenders.

=== Specialist Search Unit (SSU) ===
This unit was disbanded in June 2015, due to cuts in the police budget.

Prior to disbandment Specialist Search Unit officers searched where other police officers could not go. They were trained to search in demanding environments that needed specialist equipment, such as underwater (mostly inland waters), at height, in flooded areas as in the Lewes floods in 2000, and confined spaces.

The team were experts in searching for missing people, stolen property, drugs, weapons and firearms, and they were also licensed to find and identify improvised explosive devices. A police boat was used by the unit to undertake marine patrols along the Sussex coastline and during diving operations.

=== Tactical Firearms Unit (TFU) ===
The Tactical Firearms Unit covers the entire force from two bases.

Those bases include Sussex Police HQ (Lewes) and Gatwick. Firearms officers are deployed to incidents involving the use of firearms or other lethal weapons either on a spontaneous or pre-planned basis.

They are able to be deployed across all of Sussex, dealing with high priority crime such as drugs, burglary and violent crime. All tactical firearms (TFU) officers are trained in conflict resolution methods, meaning every incident is resolved using the minimum amount of force necessary.

Non-lethal methods used by officers include the Baton Gun for firing rubber bullets and the Taser stun-gun.

Officers are rigorously trained in threat assessment and perception, ready to make split-second decisions to protect the public against threats of violence. Officers are required to complete a two-year probationary period as firearms officers at Gatwick Airport after completing initial training.

=== Use of drones ===
Sussex Police currently operates a number of different drone models in conjunction with Surrey Police to assist with searches for missing persons, road traffic collisions, major crime and industrial accident investigation, event planning and management, and to provide situational awareness to officers and commanders in a variety of policing situations.

== Police cadets ==
Sussex Police, like many other forces in the UK, has police cadets. There are around 200 operational cadets in Sussex Police. Cadets within the VCC (Volunteer Cadet Corps) often have duties at police stations across Sussex. They have a similar uniform to non-operational police officers and police staff which consists of:

Standard issue white shirt and black clip on tie, black police fleece with hi-vis cadet badges, hi-vis police coat with cadet badges, black trousers. Epaulette saying "cadet" and a visible rank designation (normally chevrons (inversed), although they have now switched to bars), these will be located on the shoulders of the cadet's shirt, fleece and hi-vis. Standard issue police cap with a blue band and Sussex Police crest (without the crown) saying 'Sussex VCC'

Cadets learn many police skills as well as a student officer syllabus in preparation for joining as an officer. They also assist at public events and displays, as well as low risk police activities such as area searches for weapons (Weapon Sweeps), leaflet delivery.

== Future plans ==
Proposals were made by the Home Secretary on 20 March 2006 to merge the force with Surrey Police forming a single strategic police force for Sussex and Surrey. Opposed by both Sussex Police and Surrey Police, the plans were effectively abandoned by the Home Office in July 2006.

In a report published by HM Inspectorate of Constabulary in July 2011, the impact on the number of police officers and staff partly due to the reduction to Sussex Police's budget following the comprehensive spending review is as follows:

	Police officers	Police staff	PCSOs	Total
31 March 2010 (actual)	3,213	2,155	377	5,745
31 March 2015 (proposed)	2,713	1,605	377	4,695

In common with other UK forces, Sussex is being forced to save 20% from its budget by 2015. Whilst efforts are being made to minimise the impact of these cuts, inevitably there have been, and continue to be reductions in the numbers of warranted officers and police staff. In September 2010, Chief Constable Martin Richards announced plans to cut up to 1,050 police officers and staff over the following five years, saying that job cuts were inevitable as the force faced estimated budget cuts of £52m by 2015. It was estimated that about 500 of the affected jobs would be police officers.

On 10 May 2012, off-duty officers from Sussex police joined an estimated 30,000 others from around the UK to protest at the cutbacks in a march through London.

Reports in 2026 indicate that doorstep boycott campaigning is not currently treated as a policing priority by Sussex Police unless it meets the threshold of a criminal offence. The police force stated it would not investigate pro-Palestinian activists conducting "door-to-door" boycott campaigns in Brighton, noting that there has been “no evidence of criminal activity” despite complaints and concerns about intimidation, with no indication of a shift in police approach to such cases.

== Online initiatives ==
In November 2011, Sussex Police became the first force worldwide to live stream unedited footage during a 24-hour period.

Published in March 2012, Sussex Police became the first force in the UK to launch a mobile based app for reporting crime.

== Road casualties in Sussex ==
As well as preventing and detecting crime, Sussex Police have a responsibility to reduce the number of casualties on the roads. Additionally, in her 2012 PCC election manifesto, Katy Bourne said that the biggest issue raised in her Sussex Crime Survey was road safety. "Katy will encourage the police to target accident 'black spots' and high risk drivers and continue 'Operation Crackdown' to tackle anti-social driving." The following table shows the combined total figures for the number of casualties on the roads of East Sussex, West Sussex, and Brighton and Hove for the most recent five years for which data is available.

	2008	2009	2010	2011	2012
Fatal	78	63	56	64	43
Serious	946	911	772	866	842
Slight	5,225	4,928	4,461	4,311	4,197
Total	6,249	5,902	5,289	5,241	5,082

== Arms ==
Coat of arms of Sussex Police
Notes Granted 30 May 1969 Escutcheon Azure, a tower between five martlets Or.

== See also ==
- Law enforcement in the United Kingdom
- List of law enforcement agencies in the United Kingdom
- Table of police forces in the United Kingdom
- Police Memorial Trust
- National Police Memorial
