= Pat Geenty =

Patrick Geenty
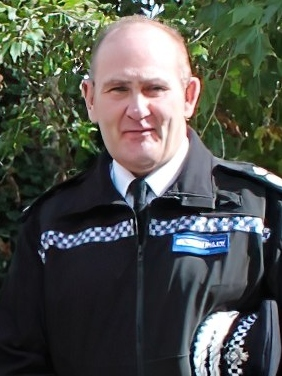

Chief Constable of Wiltshire Constabulary
- In office Jan 2013 – June 2015
- Preceded by: Brian Moore
- Succeeded by: Mike Veale

Deputy Chief Constable of Wiltshire Constabulary
- In office December 2011 – March 2012
- Preceded by: David Ainsworth
- Succeeded by: Mike Veale

Personal details
- Born: Patrick Geenty
- Profession: Senior Police Officer

Patrick Geenty was the Chief Constable of Wiltshire Police from January 2013 until June 2015. He served in Wiltshire Police from July 2009, and was temporary chief constable from March 2012, when Chief Constable Brian Moore was seconded to the UK Border Force.

Geenty was the Assistant Chief Constable with the force from April 2009 until March 2011, then Temporary Deputy Chief Constable, and then Deputy Chief Constable from December 2011. He started his policing career in 1982 as a Constable with Gloucestershire Constabulary serving in both uniform and CID officer and later Sergeant and Inspector. He moved to Humberside Police in 1998 as a Chief inspector, then Superintendent and finally as Chief Superintendent.

Geenty contributed to the "Closing the Gap" report in 2004 assessing the capability of protective services across the UK. He also led the introduction of Neighbourhood Policing to East Yorkshire and built upon that success by leading the development of integrated neighbourhood management in partnership with local agencies.

He was the ACPO lead for Missing Persons.

He was divisional commander for East Yorkshire during large scale floods of 2007.

Before his policing career, Geenty was a schoolteacher in Blackpool and Cheltenham. He has an MA in Criminology and Policing Studies from University of Exeter, and a Bachelor of Education from Saint Paul's College.

In May 2015 Chief Constable Geenty retired from Wiltshire Police having completed 34 years of policing. On retirement he moved with his family to Worcestershire and started a Studio Pottery, "Herries", making crystalline glazed porcelain.

Police appointments
Preceded by Brian Moore	Chief Constable of Wiltshire Police; 2013–2015	Succeeded by Mike Veale
