= Wiltshire Police =

English territorial police force

Agency overview
- Formed: 13 November 1839; 187 years ago
- Preceding agencies: Salisbury City Police
- Employees: 2,068 (in 2019)
- Volunteers: 265 (105 specials and 160 PSVs)
- Annual budget: £127.8 million

Jurisdictional structure
- Operations jurisdiction: Wiltshire, England, United Kingdom
- Map of police area
- Area: 1,346 square miles (3,490 km^{2})
- Population: 722,000
- Legal jurisdiction: England & Wales
- Constituting instrument: Police Act 1996
- General nature: Local civilian police

Operational structure
- Overseen by: His Majesty's Inspectorate of Constabulary and Fire & Rescue Services; Independent Office for Police Conduct
- Headquarters: Devizes
- Police officers: 1019
- Police community support officers: 132
- Police and crime commissioner responsible: Philip Wilkinson
- Agency executive: Catherine Roper, chief constable

Website
- www.wiltshire.police.uk

Wiltshire Police, formerly known as Wiltshire Constabulary, is the territorial police force responsible for policing the ceremonial county of Wiltshire in South West England.

The force serves 722,000 people over an area of 1,346 square miles (3,490 km^{2}). In terms of officer numbers, it is the second smallest force in the United Kingdom (after the City of London Police).

== History ==
=== Before 1830s ===
Prior to the 1830s, policing in Wiltshire was the responsibility of petty and parish constables, who were supervised by magistrates. This was largely ineffective as they were unpaid and untrained, and so independent and forces made up of private citizens such as the Devizes Prosecution Society emerged, and these did not immediately disappear when professional police forces came into being. The Yeomanry Cavalry was active in Wiltshire during this period and utilised as a quasi-police force.

=== 1830s ===
The Municipal Corporations Act 1835 standardised the structure and responsibilities of borough councils in England and Wales, including requiring they provide a professional police force. The Act applied both to new boroughs formed on application in large industrial cities, and to 178 already incorporated boroughs, including Salisbury (officially known as New Sarum until 2009). The New Sarum Police was founded in 1836, but was disbanded and reformed only two years later as the Salisbury City Police – the first modern police force to operate in Wiltshire. In the same year, a detachment of London's Metropolitan Police, which had been established in 1829, was called in to control riots.

Social unrest in the 1830s led to the appointment in 1836 of a royal commission on policing in the counties, which led to the County Police Act 1839. This established a framework and some government funding for magistrates in a county to form a police force based on London's Metropolitan Police, though there was no requirement for them to do so. In the same year the Act passed, groups of labourers had rioted across Wiltshire over the price of food and the introduction of new farm equipment, starting fires and destroying machinery. As a result, Wiltshire became the first county to use the provisions of the Act to form a county-level police force, with Wiltshire Constabulary being established on Wednesday 13 November 1839 at The Bear Hotel, Devizes, mere hours before the second (Gloucestershire).

Wiltshire Constabulary's first chief constable was Captain Samuel Meredith, a distinguished Royal Navy officer. An advertisement was placed to recruit 200 constables who were paid 17/6d a week (£0.875). In those first years, new constables were simply given their uniform and an instruction booklet and then sent off to work without any training or guidance. Wiltshire Constabulary started operating from January 1840 and had filled almost all its posts by the summer. The chief constable spent the first months of his time visiting all the boroughs in Wiltshire, spending almost all his £400 salary on travel. The first ranks were only constable and superintendent, but sergeant, inspector, detectives and five classes of constable were later introduced.

==== Notable events ====
Notable events for Wiltshire Police in the 19th century include the Rode Hill House murder in 1860 and the bomb explosion outside Salisbury Guildhall in September 1884.

=== 20th century ===
In 1909, His Majesty's Inspectorate of Constabulary raised concerns over the lack of a mounted division in the force. As a result, six constables were transferred to the new mounted division, which doubled to 12 the next year. Although the mounted division was not active every day, they were of particular use at the Salisbury Races, ceremonial duties such as escorting judges, and guarding the royal carriage. They were also occasionally loaned to neighbouring forces. The fate of the mounted division is unknown, but it most likely was ended during the introduction of motor vehicles in the 1920s. A roads policing unit was founded on 7 May 1939 at the urging of the Home Secretary.

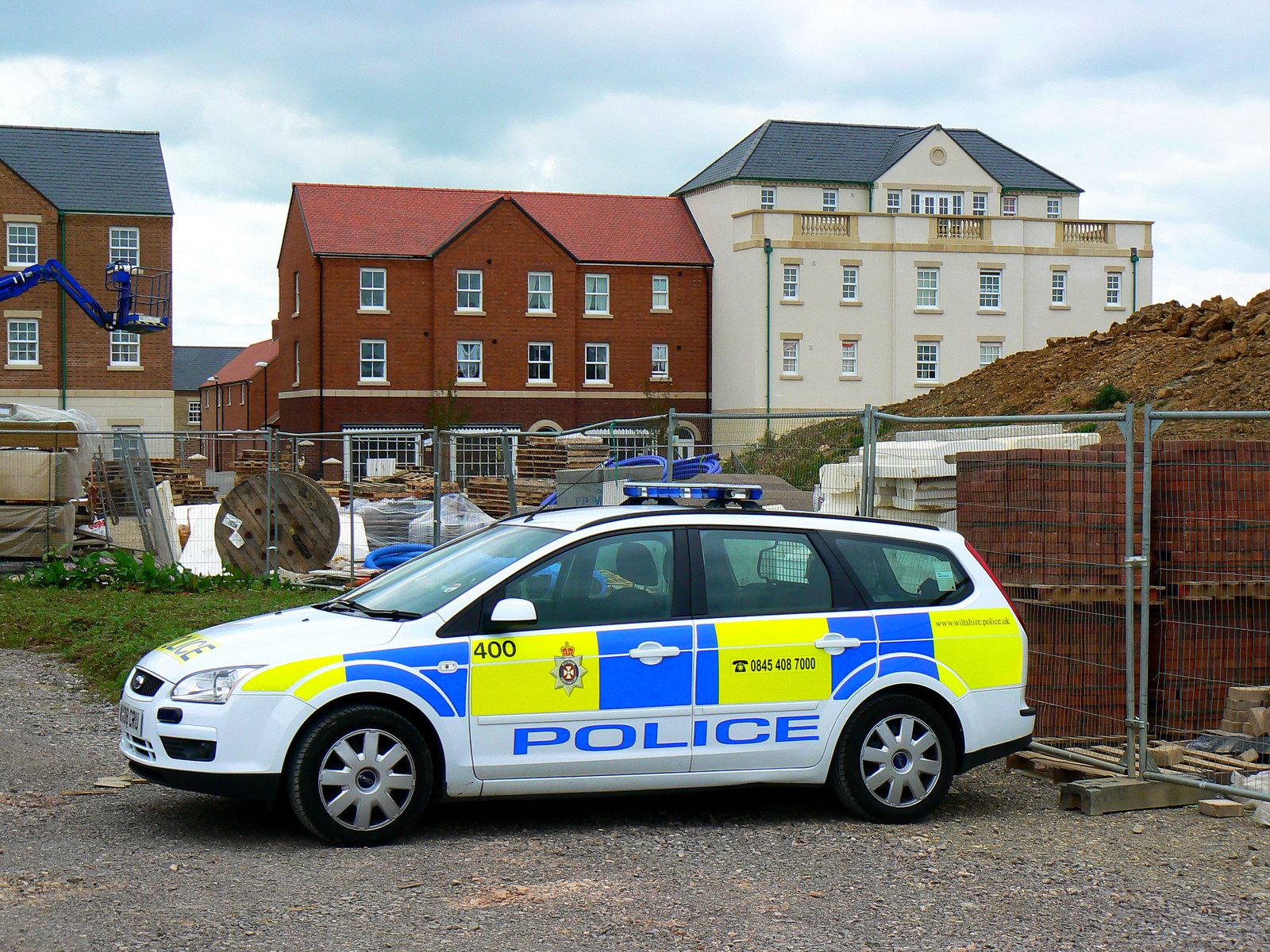
Area car in Swindon

The force did not have a true Criminal Investigation Department until 1936. On 30 June 1857, the Magistrates Committee that oversaw the force expressed interest in forming an investigation department which was founded with three of the 'most intelligent constables'. In 1936, three detective constables and a detective sergeant were appointed, but it was not until 1939 that an official head of the department was appointed, and a detective sergeant was appointed to take charge of new equipment such as that for the Photographic, Printing and Fingerprinting departments. CID remained stagnant in its development until after the war, after which it slowly expanded, and in 1997 it had 170 detectives.

Salisbury continued to have a separate police force, Salisbury City Police, from the rest of Wiltshire until World War II, when the two were merged. The merger took effect on 1 April 1943 and was initially a temporary measure, but became permanent after the war ended.

On 6 July 1961, Sir Charles Carter Chitham, a retired policeman of the former British India, laid the foundation stone of the new Wiltshire Police county headquarters at Devizes.

Twice in the 1980s, Wiltshire Police officers had to cover for the prison officers of Erlestoke Prison when they went on strike. In 1985, the force was involved in the Battle of the Beanfield, which prevented a convoy of new age travellers, known as the Peace Convoy, from establishing the fourteenth Stonehenge free festival at Stonehenge. The incident led to accusations of a police riot. Most significantly the 1980s saw the introduction of the Police National Computer, command and control systems and the HOLMES investigation system. Also a national probationary training programme was introduced in all forces for new recruits.

==== Notable events ====
Notable events in this century include the Trowbridge Christmas Eve murder in 1925 and escorting Louis Blériot when displaying his famous cross-channel aeroplane.

=== 21st century ===
Between July 2022 and May 2024, Wiltshire Police was placed under "special measures" by HM Inspectorate of Constabulary.

=== Chief constables ===
- 1839–1870 Captain Samuel Meredith RN
- 1870–1908 Captain Robert Sterne RN
- 1908–1943 Colonel Sir Höel Llewellyn
- 1943–1946 W.T. Brooks (acting chief constable)
- 1946–1963 Lt Colonel Harold Golden
- 1963–1979 George Robert Glendinning
- 1979–1983 Kenneth Mayer
- 1983–1988 Donald Smith
- 1988–1997 Walter Girven
- 1997–2004 Dame Elizabeth Neville
- 2004–2007 Martin Richards
- 2008–2012 Brian Moore
- 2012–2013 Patrick Geenty (temporary chief constable)
- 2013–2015 Patrick Geenty
- 2015–2018 Mike Veale
- 2018–2023 Kier Pritchard
- 2023–present Catherine Roper

=== Officers killed in the line of duty ===
The Police Roll of Honour Trust and Police Memorial Trust list and commemorate all British police officers killed in the line of duty. Since its establishment in 1984, the Police Memorial Trust has erected 50 memorials nationally to some of those officers.

The following officers of Wiltshire Police have died during the course of their duties:

- PC Daniel John Cooper, 2010 (road traffic accident)
- Sergeant Michael Ivor Tucker, 1991 (heart attack during firearms training)
- PC John Lewis Marsh, 1989 (collapsed and died after struggling to arrest a suspect)
- DC Mark Herbert, 1987 (road traffic accident)
- PC Desmond Derrick Kellam, 1979 (attacked by a suspect)
- PC Philip Stephen Russell, 1978 (road traffic accident)
- PC Leonard Alan Harding, 1977 (road traffic accident)
- PC Robert Edward Cray, 1973 (struck by car)
- PC Colin D. R. Hayward, 1968 (road traffic accident)
- PC Cedric A. Hemming, 1968 (struck by car)
- PC Maurice William Foord, 1961 (struck by car)
- Chief Inspector Edmund Richard Norris, 1955 (road traffic accident)
- War Reserve Constable Albert William Newman, 1942 (shot)
- Inspector Albert Enos Mitchell (road traffic accident)
- PC Henry G. Tanner, 1931 (road traffic accident)
- PC Frank Gray, 1929 (road traffic accident)
- Sergeant William Frank Crouch, 1913 (shot)
- Superintendent Frederick Bull, 1892 (fatally injured while riding horse)
- Sergeant Enos Molden, 1892 (shot)
- PC Andrew Albert Reuben Hancock, 1875 (attacked during a disturbance)

== Units ==
=== Ports policing unit ===
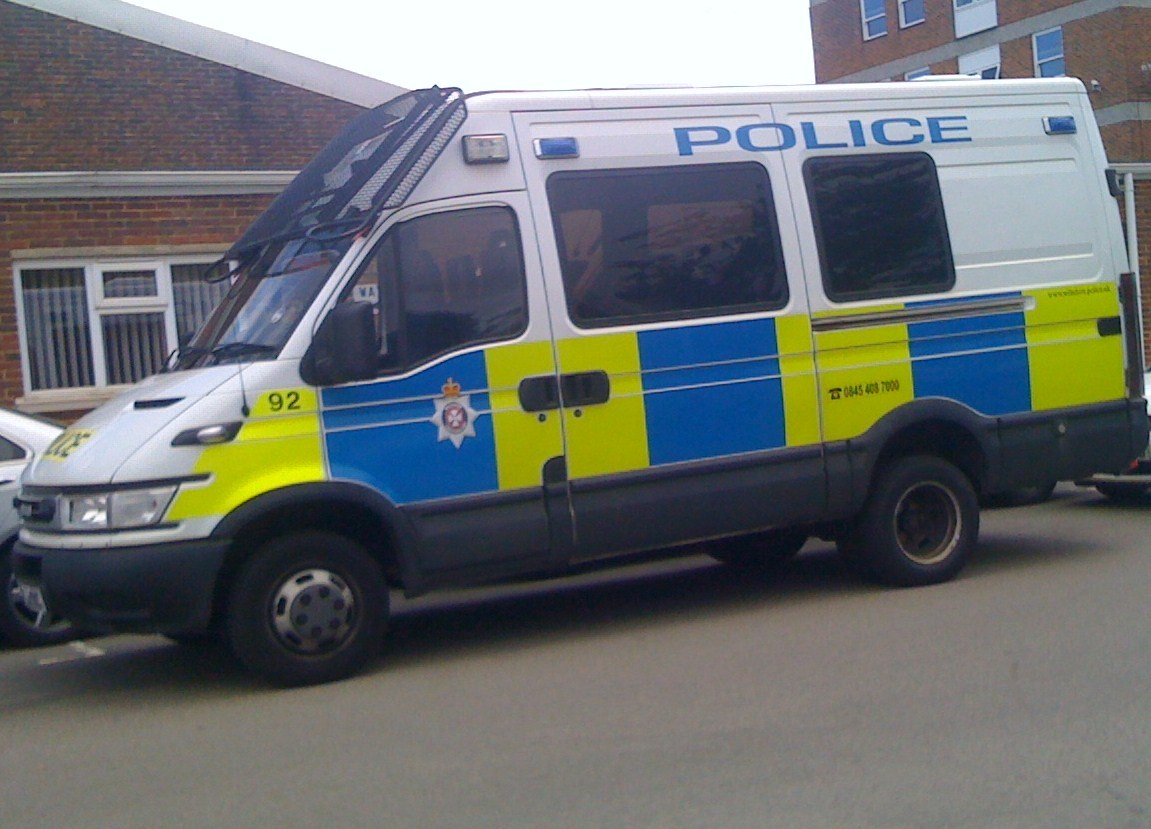
Wiltshire Police carrier

The Wiltshire Police Ports Unit was established in April 2000. It is responsible for policing all non-designated airfields in Wiltshire, making sure that legislation is followed, particularly the Terrorism Act 2000. It also obtains any intelligence on smuggling and contraband. Ports in Wiltshire include Old Sarum Airfield and Clench Common Airfield.

=== Air support unit ===
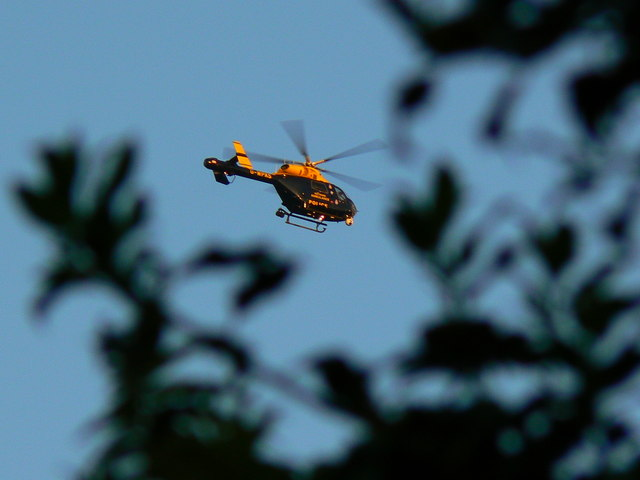
Wiltshire Police helicopter flying over Swindon

The air support unit was officially created in the spring of 1990, but Wiltshire Police had been renting helicopters since the late 1980s. They experimented with fixed-wing aircraft, a Robinson Beta 22 helicopter and an Aérospatiale Gazelle, but later chose a Bolkow Bo 105 in 1990, which was used for seven years until it was replaced by a McDonnell Douglas MD 902 Explorer. This helicopter was shared with the Great Western Ambulance Service, an arrangement that was seen in only one other area of the country. Besides the pilot, the helicopter carried an observer and a paramedic. The air support unit was based at the headquarters in Devizes, where a hangar was built in 1993.

In 2014, the unit was merged into the National Police Air Service, meaning the force no longer owned or operated its own helicopter. From January 2015, the air ambulance function separated into Wiltshire Air Ambulance, a registered charity which operates its own helicopter; the charity leased the Devizes airbase until it moved to a newly built base near Melksham in June 2018.

=== Tri-force specialist operations unit ===
Between 2013 and 2019, a collaboration with the Avon & Somerset and Gloucestershire forces covered roads policing, firearms and police dogs.

== Governance ==
As of 20 August 2021, the Wiltshire Police and Crime Commissioner (PCC) is Philip Wilkinson. The police and crime commissioner is scrutinised by the Wiltshire Police and Crime Panel, made up of elected councillors from the local authorities in the police area.

Before the first PCC was elected in 2012, the force was under the local oversight of the Wiltshire Police Authority. The police authority had nine councillor members, who were appointed from Wiltshire Council and Swindon Borough Council, and eight independent members, one of whom was a justice of the peace. The responsible government department is the Home Office.

== Organisation ==
Wiltshire Police has two divisions – Swindon and Wiltshire – incorporating eight Community Policing Team areas.

	Swindon	Royal Wootton Bassett	Chippenham	Devizes	Salisbury	Amesbury	Trowbridge	Warminster
Hub station	Gablecross, South Marston	Royal Wootton Bassett	Monkton Park, Chippenham	Devizes	Bourne Hill, Salisbury	Amesbury	Trowbridge	Warminster
Covers	Swindon, Highworth	Royal Wootton Bassett, Malmesbury, Cricklade, Lyneham	Chippenham, Corsham, Calne	Devizes, Marlborough, Pewsey	Salisbury, Alderbury, Wilton	Amesbury, Bulford, Durrington, Larkhill, Tidworth, Ludgershall, Perham Down	Bradford-on-Avon, Melksham, Trowbridge	Westbury, Warminster, Mere

=== Rank structure ===
A proposal was made in 2013 to abolish the rank of Chief Inspector, but this proposal was eventually scrapped.

== Locations ==
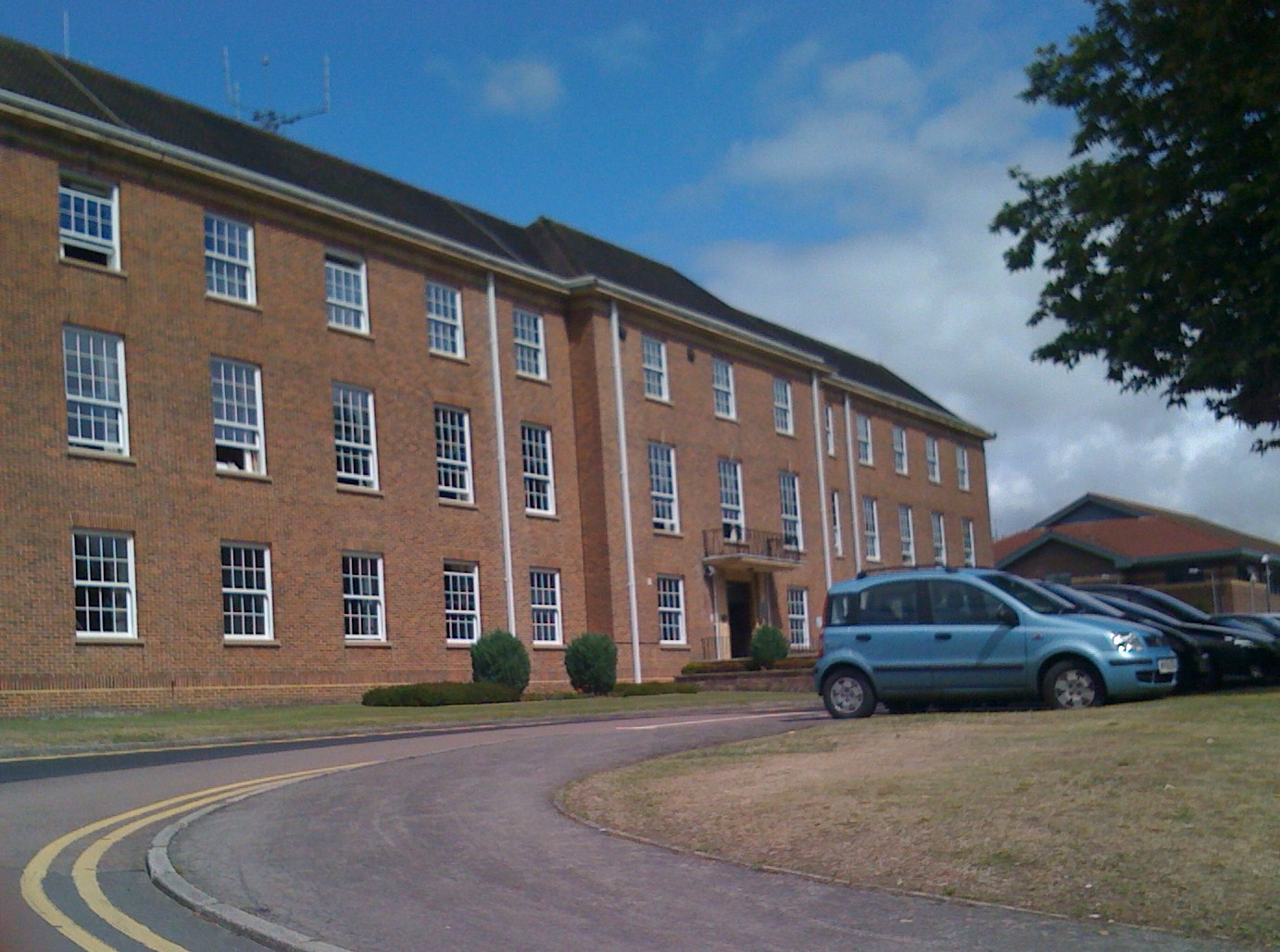
Wiltshire Police Headquarters, Devizes

The headquarters of Wiltshire Police is at London Road, Devizes, where it has always been because of its geographical position in the centre of Wiltshire. The operational headquarters are at Melksham for county division and Gablecross, South Marston, for Swindon division. The emergency communications centres for Wiltshire Police are at Devizes and Gablecross. The SNEN non-emergency call centre is at Devizes. Devizes is also the home of the Dog Squad and the training facilities for all new recruits.

There are enquiry offices at Gablecross, Chippenham, Marlborough, Trowbridge, Melksham (south of the town at Hampton Park) and Salisbury. Custody units are at Gablecross and Melksham.

The number of other sites was reduced after a 2017 review by the Police and Crime Commissioner. Swindon division has police posts at North Swindon, West Swindon and Swindon Centre. County division has sites at Cricklade, Royal Wootton Bassett, Calne, Malmesbury, Corsham, Bradford on Avon, Warminster, Tisbury, Mere, Devizes, Amesbury, Tidworth and Pewsey. There is also a police post at Leigh Delamere services on the M4.

In 2021, ten former station buildings were offered for sale, namely Marlborough, Malmesbury, Warminster, Highworth, Westbury, Cricklade, Alderbury, Calne, Pewsey and Wilton.

The facilities at Chippenham (Monkton Park), Corsham (Springfield campus), Salisbury (Bourne Hill) and Tisbury (Nadder Centre) are within Wiltshire Council buildings; the 2017 review stated a goal to increase the use of shared buildings. In late 2019 and early 2020, officers began using Wiltshire Council libraries in Malmesbury, Westbury, Downton and Wilton as "touchdown" points, to increase contact with the public.

=== Former sites ===
Wiltshire Police's headquarters used to be on Bath Road in Devizes, formerly the Wiltshire Militia Stores; it was acquired in 1879 by Wiltshire Police as their headquarter, and nearby was a row of houses where senior officers lived. The building has since been demolished. Wiltshire Police remained at this site for 85 years until the early 1960s when the organization required a larger headquarters and the new building was commissioned on the London Road site, which was opened in 1964.

The station at Highworth closed in 2018 and the station (with adjoining house) at Wroughton was sold at around the same time. Stations at Alderbury, Westbury and Wilton had closed by March 2020.

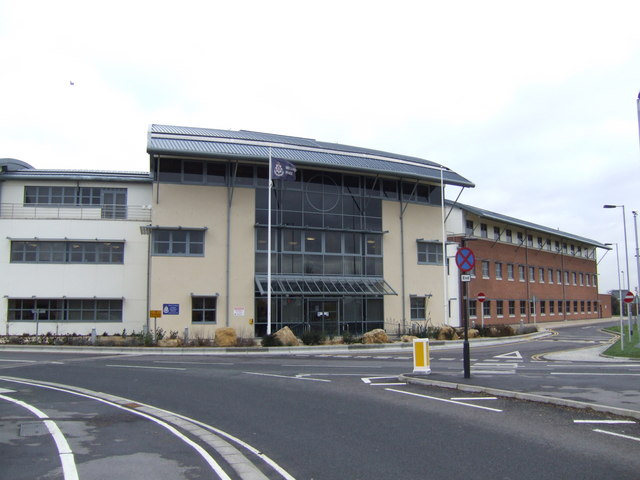
Gablecross Police Station, Swindon

== Notable operations ==
=== Swindon Town Football Club ===
Swindon Town Football Club on County Road attracts continuous police attention as the club has been known for hooliganism since the 1970s. Swindon Town has imposed banning orders on those supporters who cause disruption, criminal damage or are violent when attending games. There were 29 banning orders in place in 2006, which was an increase from a total of 11 in 2005. The increase resulted in a reduction of arrests at games, with 22 people being arrested attending games in 2005–06 compared to 39 arrests in 2004–05. Of the 22 arrests in 2005–06, 11 were for public disorder, 5 for violent disorder and the rest were made up of offences relating to missile throwing, racist chanting, pitch invasion, alcohol-related offences and one incident of being in possession of an offensive weapon. 33 Swindon fans were banned from travelling to the 2006 FIFA World Cup.

=== Hungerford massacre, 1987 ===
Wiltshire Police responded to a fatal shooting in Savernake Forest on 19 August 1987, which escalated to a further 15 killings in the neighbouring police area (Thames Valley Police) and came to be called the Hungerford massacre.

=== Royal Wootton Bassett, 2007–2010 ===
Between 2007 and 2011 the Wiltshire town of Wootton Bassett was host to the repatriations of fallen service men and women who died in Afghanistan and Iraq. The bodies were brought through the town from RAF Lyneham on their way to the John Radcliffe Hospital at Oxford. Wiltshire Police were responsible for policing the crowds and any special events. Officers from Wootton Bassett station received a special award at the Jane's Police Awards for their contribution to policing the repatriations. Police were again praised for policing the 'Ride of Respect' in March 2010, the operation included planning, marshalling and policing the crowd and 22,000 participants.

=== Salisbury and Amesbury poisonings, 2018 ===
Wiltshire Police took part in Operation Fairline – the multi-agency response to the poisoning of Sergei and Yulia Skripal in March 2018 at Salisbury – and Operation Fortis, which followed further poisonings in June at Amesbury. They received mutual support from 40 other forces, involving 1,200 officers. By June 2018 the cost of the first incident was estimated at £7.5 million, and in November total costs were projected to be £10.8m.

== Performance ==
=== British Crime Survey ===
Wiltshire is one of the safest counties in the UK, with the 6th lowest crime rate per 1000 people in England. Recorded crime dropped by 7%, or 2,706 crimes, between April 2009 and March 2010. Wiltshire Police's detection rate is 6% higher than average, at 28%.

Wiltshire Police also have a favourable public image with the 2nd best in the UK for the public perceptions that police are dealing with anti-social behaviour effectively, and 3rd best in the UK for the public perceptions that police are dealing with drunk and disorderly behaviour effectively.

Drink driving in Wiltshire was highlighted as a problem in the National Summer 2010 Drink Drive Campaign that saw 2.87% of 3377 positive for drink driving in June 2010. However this is a drop of 3.53% from 2009.

=== Her Majesty's Inspectorate of Constabulary ===
A report from March 2010 by Her Majesty's Inspectorate of Constabulary placed Wiltshire Police among 10 forces that were graded as being 'excellent' and improving on reducing crime, 'fair' at protecting citizens from serious harm, and 'fair' for confidence and satisfaction. Wiltshire was also among 13 forces classed as 'good' for local policing, and 13 forces that received no 'poor' grade in any category.

In July 2022, the inspectorate found the force 'inadequate' in three areas: responding to the public, protecting vulnerable people – in particular, victims of domestic abuse – and making use of its resources. Consequently, Wiltshire Police began to be monitored under the 'Engage' process, sometimes called "special measures". At that time, the force was one of six that were subject to this additional scrutiny. A review in December 2022 found a decline in the force's performance in investigating crime effectively. In May 2024, the inspectorate found that the force had made good progress in the three areas of concern and therefore removed the 'Engage' monitoring.

=== Independent Police Complaints Commission ===
In the year 2007/8 complaints and allegations recorded slightly decreased from the previous year. Wiltshire Police has one of the lowest rates for 'incivility' allegations at 11%, but one of the highest for 'oppressive conduct or harassment' at 15% and 'breach of PACE Code C' at 9%.

In the same 2007/8 period, Wiltshire Police received 234 complaints and 460 allegations. Wiltshire has an above-average 358 allegations per 100 officers, spread across five categories. Wiltshire Police are 1% or 0% lower on allegations except for 'incivility, impoliteness and intolerance', for which they receive 10% less allegations than the national average.

Of the 460, 26% were investigated, 43% came to a resolution and 31% were withdrawn, dispensed with or discontinued. Of the 26% allegations investigated in 2007/8, 91% were unsubstantiated, 2% higher than the national average.

== Controversy ==
=== Battle of the Beanfield ===
In 1985, Wiltshire Police prevented a vehicle convoy of several hundred new age travellers from setting up at the 11th Stonehenge Free Festival at Stonehenge in Wiltshire, after site custodians English Heritage were granted an exclusion zone of 4 miles (6.4 km) around the stones. A violent exchange between the travellers and police in riot gear took place over several hours. Eight police officers and 16 travellers were taken to hospital with minor injuries. One traveller suffered from a fractured skull. As much of the action took place in a field containing a bean crop, the events became known as the Battle of the Beanfield.

A sergeant in the Wiltshire Police was subsequently found guilty of having caused actual bodily harm to a traveller. Members of the convoy sued Wiltshire Police for wrongful arrest, assault and criminal damage as a result of the damage to themselves and their property. David Brudenell-Bruce, Earl of Cardigan who had witnessed the events, gave evidence against the police. After four months of hearings, 21 of the travellers were successful in their case and were awarded £24,000 in damages.

=== Sergeant Mark Andrews ===
In June 2008 Pamela Somerville was arrested near Melksham after being found asleep in her car, for failing to provide a specimen of breath for breath alcohol analysis. The custody officer in Melksham police station, Sergeant Mark Andrews, was accused of assaulting Somerville during her detention, including dragging her through the custody suite and dropping her onto the concrete floor of a detention cell.

Andrews was initially found guilty of actual bodily harm and was sentenced to six months in prison and faced dismissal from the police force. Assistant Chief Constable Patrick Geenty criticised his subordinate and apologised to Somerville. On 14 September 2010, Andrews was bailed after serving only six days of his sentence pending an appeal against his conviction to be held at Oxford Crown Court in November 2010.

On 18 November 2010, Andrews was cleared of any wrongdoing with regards to the allegation of assault in Melksham Custody against Somerville. Andrews claimed that Somerville had grabbed hold of the door frame of the cell and on letting go she had fallen to the floor. Mr Justice Bean declared Somerville was drunk when she was put in the cells and he believed that Andrews did not intend to throw her to the floor.

=== DCC David Ainsworth ===
Deputy Chief Constable David Ainsworth, formerly ACC of Kent Police, was found dead at his home on 22 March 2011. He had hanged himself. He had been removed from his normal duties while an "internal staff issue" was investigated. Wiltshire Police allowed South Wales Police and the Independent Police Complaints Commission to conduct an inquiry into the matter. The coroner released Wiltshire Police of any burden noting they had implemented 'comprehensive welfare arrangements' for Ainsworth. The independent report criticised Wiltshire Police for failing to properly vet Ainsorth when assuming the role of DCC. The report also said the force was "ill-prepared" to deal with the "exceptional situation" of the harassment complaints made. Wiltshire Police responded saying that ACPO should share some of the burden as they had 'green lit' the application for the ACC to DCC promotion, a form that did not include a section for vetting.

=== PC Ronnie Lungu ===
Wiltshire Police was found, in a 2015 Employment Tribunal decision, to have racially harassed and discriminated against a black officer, PC Ronnie Lungu.

=== Investigation into Edward Heath ===
In 2017 the force faced public criticism for its £1.5M investigation into alleged sexual abuse by deceased prime minister Edward Heath.

== Budget cuts ==
=== Proposed merger ===
In 2006, the Home Office announced plans to reduce the number of police forces in the UK from 42 to 24 in an attempt to save money. The plans were abandoned later that year due to lack of funding for the mergers, but the idea has resurfaced many times. The proposal would see Wiltshire Police merge with Gloucestershire Constabulary, Devon and Cornwall Police, Avon and Somerset Constabulary and Dorset Police.

In 2010, the plans were publicly criticised by all the involved forces, stating that it would lead to poor quality service and a reduction in local policing.

=== Speed cameras ===
After a 27% loss of funding from the Department of Transport, Chief Executives of Wiltshire and Swindon Camera Safety Partnership decided to switch off all fixed speed cameras, causing the loss of 40 jobs. Despite a 33% reduction in deaths and injuries on Wiltshire roads, the decision to close the partnership was made in early August 2010. ACC Geenty said "This has been a very difficult decision and one that the partners have agonised over because we are of course committed to continuing to improve road safety".

== In the media ==
Wiltshire Police officers are often featured on the Bravo police-reality programmes Brit Cops: Zero Tolerance and Brit Cops: Frontline Crime; the show usually follows officers in Salisbury or Swindon. The show is often repeated on Virgin 1. Wiltshire Police officers based at Salisbury station are featured in Nights Cops, a shadowing documentary following officers who work nights shifts in city centres. The Motorcycle Policing unit was featured on Channel 5's Emergency Bikers in Series 2 where they escorted a Hercules from Wootton Bassett towards Somerset.

Wiltshire Police headquarters was used as a police building for an opening shot in the 1992 version of Agatha Christie's The A.B.C. Murders, for which all cars and signs were removed.

Since 2017, Wiltshire Police have participated in Channel 4's 999: What's you Emergency? which follows frontline officers and staff in the 999 control room.

== Other activities ==
=== Wiltshire Police Cadets ===
Wiltshire Police has a police cadet scheme since 2014. Cadets wear black trousers, dark brown fleeces, white shirts, red ties and black hats (bowlers for girls) with a red band and red cadet epaulettes. Previously there was a cadet scheme until August 1980 when it was closed, along with many other similar schemes in the UK. The cadets at that time wore uniforms the same as constables, except with a blue-banded peaked cap and 'Cadet' on their epaulettes.

The scheme gave rise to many of the force's constables. For instance, the current Chief Inspector of Swindon Operations, Mike Jones, was in the last ever cadet unit in the Wiltshire Police. There has been discussion to roll out a police cadet scheme based on the example of the North Wales Police, but due to economic circumstances it seems unlikely that such a scheme would be re-introduced.

In 2014 The first cadets scheme was started in Swindon: since then it has expanded to Trowbridge, Salisbury and Chippenham sectors. The purpose of the scheme is presented as a way of engaging with young people and gaining a resource for minor policing matters. However, the scheme does not envisage direct police officer recruitment from the cadets, as had been the case in the 1980s.

=== Wiltshire Police Band ===
The Wiltshire Police Band, established in 1984, is a military-style band which plays to raise funds for charities and to support the force. As of 2024, all members of the band are civilians.

=== The Wiltshire Bobby Van Trust ===
The Wiltshire Bobby Van Trust was set up in 1998 by Chief Constable Dame Elizabeth Neville. It is an independent charity that provides home security to victims of crime, and Wiltshire's elderly and disadvantaged. It currently funds three 'bobby vans' that serve as mobile workshops to the three operators, who are trained locksmiths, carpenters, crime reduction officers and fire risk assessors. The operators travel around the county installing equipment to those who need it, free of charge. They are directed by coordinators who prioritise the referrals received from eight different sources.

The Bobby Van Trust works closely with Wiltshire Police and Wiltshire Fire and Rescue Service. However, it is independently funded through public donations and small government grants.

The Bobby Van Trust is made up of three operators, three coordinators, 11 trustees and 1 police liaison officer. The current director is Jennie Shaw and the patron is Queen Camilla.

For the financial year of 2009 the Wiltshire Bobby Van Trust raised £256,153, a decrease of £2984 from 2008, and spent £231,692, an increase of 10,908.

== See also ==
- Law enforcement in the United Kingdom
- List of law enforcement agencies in the United Kingdom
- Table of police forces in the United Kingdom
