= Brian Moore (police officer) =

Brian Moore QPM

Director General of UK Border Force
- In office 1 March 2012 – 1 October 2012
- Preceded by: Post created
- Succeeded by: Tony Smith

Chief Constable of Wiltshire Police
- In office 1 January 2008 – 1 March 2012
- Preceded by: Martin Richards
- Succeeded by: Patrick Geenty

Personal details
- Born: 1959 (age 66–67)
- Profession: Police officer

Brian Moore QPM (born 1959) is a British retired police officer, who served as the first Director General of UK Border Force from 1 March 2012 to 1 October 2012, overseeing the London 2012 Olympics.

In July 2012, Moore announced that he would be standing down from the post in October 2012, choosing not to apply for the role permanently, to pursue "further options in his policing career". His leadership of the UK Border Force was controversial after reports of increased customer hospitality and uniform standards, while airport queues rose.

In May 2012, following an internal sexual harassment case involving one of Moore's senior officers, the coroner cleared Wiltshire Police of any wrongdoing; however, it noted that the force was "ill-prepared" to deal with such an internal matter and an independent inquiry found loopholes in the vetting of the senior officer.

== Early career ==
Brian Moore was Chief Constable of Wiltshire Constabulary from 1 January 2008 until 1 March 2012. During his leadership he made Wiltshire the safest county in the country.

Moore was previously the Deputy Chief Constable at Surrey Police, after working his way up the ranks since 1975 in Lancashire Constabulary, Metropolitan Police and Surrey Police.

== Honours ==
While Chief Constable of Wiltshire, Moore was awarded the Queen's Police Medal in the 2009 New Year Honours.

Ribbon	Description	Notes
	Queen's Police Medal (QPM)	2009
	Queen Elizabeth II Golden Jubilee Medal	2002; UK version of this medal
	Queen Elizabeth II Diamond Jubilee Medal	2012; UK version of this medal
	Police Long Service and Good Conduct Medal	

Police appointments
Preceded by Martin Richards	Chief Constable of Wiltshire Police; 2008–2012	Succeeded by Patrick Geenty
Preceded by Post Created	Director General of UK Border Force (Interim); 2012–2012	Succeeded by Tony Smith
