= Martin Richards (police officer) =

British Chief Constable

Martin Richards QPM

Chief Constable of Wiltshire Police
- In office 2004–2008
- Preceded by: Elizabeth Neville
- Succeeded by: Brian Moore

Chief Constable of Sussex Police
- In office 2008–2014
- Preceded by: Joe Edwards
- Succeeded by: Giles York

Personal details
- Born: 13 August 1959 Staffordshire, England
- Spouse: Judith Richards
- Children: Two sons & two stepsons
- Occupation: Police officer

Martin Richards QPM (born 1959) is a British retired police officer, whose last post was as the Chief Constable of Sussex Police, a position in which he served from 1 October 2008 until his retirement from the Police service in 2014. He previously served as Chief Constable of the Wiltshire Police.

== Education ==
Richards was a student at Warwick School from 1966 to 1977. For his tertiary education, he attended and graduated from the University of Bristol. Richards later attained a master's degree in criminology at the University of Cambridge during his career in the police force.

== Career ==
Richards joined Warwickshire Police in 1982, where he was stationed across a range of geographical areas in numerous roles. His command positions included District Commander at Nuneaton, Head of Communications, Performance Review Manager, and a short period as Head of CID. He also served for two years in National Police Training as Head of Recruit Training Centre at Ryton-on-Dunsmore.

After obtaining his Criminology degree, Richards was promoted to Assistant Chief Constable at Avon and Somerset Constabulary in 1998. He was promoted to Deputy Chief Constable in 2002.

Richards was appointed Chief Constable of the Wiltshire Police in September 2004. While he was Chief Constable, he oversaw "Optimus", a 12-month programme of modernisation and reform within the Force, as well as a collaborative project involving all five forces within the South West region.

Richards was the Chair of the National Training Managers Group. When the minimum national qualification was introduced in January 2010 by the National Policing Improvement Agency (NPIA), he oversaw the national implementation of the Initial Police Learning and Development Programme (IPLDP), a compulsory diploma to be obtained by all new recruits. Richards also represented Association of Chief Police Officers on the Police Dependants' Trust. Richards is now the Independent Chair of Chichester Diocese Safeguarding Panel. He is also a non-executive director with Sussex NHS partnership Mental Health.

== Personal life ==
Richards has two sons from his first marriage, Charlie and Hugh, and two stepsons, Robert and Marcus.

== Honours ==

Ribbon	Description	Notes
	Queen's Police Medal (QPM)	
	Queen Elizabeth II Golden Jubilee Medal	2002; UK version of this medal
	Queen Elizabeth II Diamond Jubilee Medal	2012; UK version of this medal
	Police Long Service and Good Conduct Medal	

Police appointments
Preceded by Elizabeth Neville	Chief Constable of Wiltshire Police; 2004–2008	Succeeded by Brian Moore
Preceded by Joe Edwards	Chief Constable of Sussex Police; 2008–2014	Succeeded by Giles York
