= Mike Veale =

British police officer

Michael Veale was the Chief Constable of Cleveland Police in northeast England until his resignation in January 2019. From 2015 until 2018 he was Chief Constable of Wiltshire Police, the force responsible for policing Wiltshire and Swindon in the southwest of England. He came to national prominence in 2017 when Wiltshire Police presented the findings of its investigation into alleged sexual abuse by former prime minister Edward Heath.

== Life and career ==
Veale was born in 1966 and grew up in Midsomer Norton and Chilcompton, Somerset. He began his policing career as a police cadet aged 16, before joining Avon and Somerset Constabulary as a constable in 1984. He served in Bristol and Somerset before being promoted to Detective Superintendent and transferring to Wiltshire Police, where he was promoted to Detective Chief Superintendent as Head of CID. In 2009, Veale was appointed Temporary Assistant Chief Constable and then took up the post of divisional commander. He became Deputy Chief Constable in March 2013 and Chief Constable on 1 June 2015.

Angus Macpherson, the Wiltshire Police and Crime Commissioner, decided not to renew Veale's contract which had been due to expire in June 2018. In January 2018, Veale was appointed Chief Constable of Cleveland Police.

Veale said budget cuts prevented Cleveland Police from providing an effective service for the public. He stated in November 2018: "Forces across the country including Cleveland are more efficient and more effective than ever before, but despite this efficiency the service we are providing the public is nowhere near where it needs to be. (...) The cuts created and caused by austerity are too deep and have gone on for too long. It is about time that trend was reversed. My message is clear; give us the tools and we will do the job."

Veale resigned his Cleveland Police position in January 2019. An inspection in the following May by Her Majesty's Inspectorate of Constabulary and Fire & Rescue Services graded the force as 'inadequate' in three areas, a deterioration since the previous inspection.

In the summer of 2021, Veale was hired as an advisor by Rupert Matthews, recently elected as the Leicestershire Police and Crime Commissioner. In December 2022 he was appointed as interim CEO of Leicestershire PCC, but resigned two months later in response to continued negative media coverage.

In the summer of 2023, a disciplinary panel ruled that Veale's 2018 remarks to junior colleagues on the Cleveland force amounted to gross misconduct. Subsequently, Cleveland PCC Steve Turner barred Veale from future police work, saying he would have been dismissed if still a serving officer.

== Controversy ==
In 2015, Veale authorised the Wiltshire force to commence an enquiry, named Operation Conifer, into allegations (which turned out to be false) made by Carl Beech ("Nick") of sexual abuse by former prime minister Edward Heath, whose Salisbury home (prior to his death in 2005) was within the force's area. This reported in September 2017. The enquiry concluded that while many reported accusations against Heath were unfounded, there were seven that would have led to him being questioned under caution. Veale faced public calls for his resignation for a £1.5M investigation of historic events.

Meanwhile, the Metropolitan Police had set up Operation Midland in 2014 to investigate other allegations by Beech, and closed their investigation in March 2016 without bringing any charges. Beech would go on to be convicted of charges related to fabricating those allegations in July 2019, and sentenced to 18 years prison.

On 10 October 2017, former MP Harvey Proctor who had previously been falsely accused of sexual abuse by Beech, criticised Veale for allegedly "trashing" his reputation a second time by reviving claims of an establishment paedophile ring. Veale had called for a fresh inquiry into claims of cover-up and conspiracy in Westminster. On 11 October 2017, Lord Finkelstein stated in an article headed "This disgraceful chief constable must quit" in The Times newspaper that "the investigation of Heath was naive and disproportionate" and that Veale "should go" for "the attempt to win a public relations battle using the moral authority of the police".

In September 2018, he was found by the Independent Office for Police Conduct to have lied about how his Wiltshire Police mobile phone became damaged. The IOPC had found that Veale had a case to answer for "alleged misconduct for providing and maintaining an inaccurate account of how damage to his work mobile phone was caused".

== Honours ==

Ribbon	Description	Notes
	Queen Elizabeth II Golden Jubilee Medal	2002; UK Version of this Medal
	Queen Elizabeth II Diamond Jubilee Medal	2012; UK Version of this Medal
	Police Long Service and Good Conduct Medal	

Police appointments
Preceded by Patrick Geenty	Chief Constable of Wiltshire Police; 2015–2018	Succeeded by Kier Pritchard
Preceded by Iain Spittal	Chief Constable of Cleveland Police; 2018–2019	Succeeded by TBA
