= Henry Solomon =

British chief constable (1794–1844)

Chief Constable Henry Solomon
- Born: 1794
- Died: 14 March 1844 (aged 49); Brighton, East Sussex, England
- Police career
- Department: Brighton Borough Police
- Rank: Chief Constable

Chief Constable Henry Solomon (1794 – 14 March 1844) was a police officer who became the first Chief Constable of Brighton Borough Police in East Sussex, England.

Originally a London watchmaker, Solomon was appointed as Chief Constable – the highest rank in the force – on 18 May 1838, which was a notable appointment in that period as he was a Jewish man. He became the superior officer to two superintendents, three inspectors, twenty-four constables and a night constable – a total of thirty-one officers for a population of around 47,000.

While interviewing a prisoner – 23-year-old John Lawrence, for theft of a roll of carpet – on 13 March 1844, Solomon was bludgeoned by Lawrence with a poker, causing a head injury from which he later died. An appeal to which Queen Victoria gave £50 (equivalent to £5,000 in 2025) raised a large sum for the welfare of his widow and nine children. Lawrence was found guilty of murder at Lewes Assizes and publicly hanged at Horsham.

Solomon is thought to be the only Chief Constable in the United Kingdom to have been murdered in his own police station. His ghost reputedly haunts the basement of the building, now a town hall. He is buried in the Florence Place Old Jewish Burial Ground in Brighton's Round Hill district, where he has been considered to be the 'celebrity' grave. In 2004, his was one of several local names to be chosen to appear on the front of a new fleet of buses in Brighton.

The inscription on Solomon's gravestone reads: 15 years chief officer of police / of the town of Brighton / who was brutally murdered / while in the public discharge / of the duties of his office / on the 14th day of March 1844 / in the fiftieth year of his age.
