= George Terry (police officer) =

British police officer

Sir George Walter Roberts Terry CBE CStJ QPM DL (29 May 1921 – 18 August 1995) was a senior British police officer, who served as Chief Constable of Pembrokeshire, East Sussex, Lincolnshire and Sussex Police Forces, and as president of the Association of Chief Police Officers.

== Early life ==
Terry was born on 29 May 1921, the son of Walter George Tygh Terry and his wife Constance Elizabeth Terry. After schooling in Peterborough, Terry joined the Birmingham City Constabulary in 1940, eventually securing promotion through the ranks to Superintendent. He served with the Northamptonshire Regiment in Italy from 1942 to 1946, rising to the rank of Staff Captain.

== Career ==
=== Police ===
After serving with the Birmingham Force on demobilisation, he was appointed Chief Constable of Pembrokeshire Police in 1958; at the age of 35, this made him one of the youngest Chief Constables in English history. He remained with Pembrokeshire until 1965, when he was transferred to the same post in the East Sussex force. There, he implemented a range of modernising reforms, improving communication systems and introducing motor scooters for women police officers. He was Deputy Chief Constable for Sussex from 1968 to 1969 and then spent three years as Chief Constable of Lincolnshire Police, before returning to Sussex as Chief Constable in 1973, serving until 1983.

His long period at Sussex saw him implement reflective strips on the side of police cars, introduce more comfortable uniforms for women officers, open a computerised command centre, and reform the command structure. Terry delegated substantially to his junior officers and, according to The Telegraph, was "later credited with creating the single-tier command by superintendent". In 1982, the Kincora child sexual abuse scandal erupted and involved allegations that the Royal Ulster Constabulary were involved in a cover up; Terry was tasked with producing a report on the matter. Although The Telegraph later summarised that "Terry handled the business with typical professionalism and produced a report that was satisfactory to all parties", the issue was more controversial, with regional politicians in Northern Ireland alleging that "important questions" were left "unanswered" in the Terry report.

In addition to his operational work, Terry was an expert on traffic management and Chairman of the Traffic Committee (1976–79). He was also president of the Association of Chief Police Officers for the year 1980–81.

=== Retirement ===
After retiring from the police, Terry was embroiled in controversy as chairman of Polygraph Security Services, the British company offering lie detector tests. The House of Commons Employment Select Committee had asked him to submit a list of clients to them for investigation, but he refused, citing privacy concerns; The Times reported that he could have been reported to the Commons for contempt if he continued to refuse. He resigned from the post in July 1984. Afterwards, he worked as a director for Terrafix Ltd from 1984 and a trustee of the Disabled Housing Trust from 1985. He was a keen gardener, and particularly enjoyed tending to his chrysanthemums and carnations.

== Honours ==
In 1967, Terry was awarded the Queen's Police Medal (QPM). He was appointed a Commander of the Order of the British Empire (CBE) in 1976 and knighted in 1982. As well as being Commander of the Order of St John of Jerusalem, he was a Deputy Lieutenant for East Sussex from 1983.

== Death and legacy ==
Terry had married Charlotte Elizabeth Kresina in 1942 and had a son with her. Terry died on 18 August 1995. He was, according to The Telegraph, "one of the most respected policemen of his generation ... a tall, handsome man of enormous vitality, he rejuvenated each command with ruthless perfectionism, and won a reputation as an outstanding innovator". Averse to dogma and excessive bureaucracy, Terry was outspoken and devoted to his officers; "suspicious of teetotallers", he enjoyed drinking with those he found amicable, honest and ready to admit their mistakes.
