= Malling House =

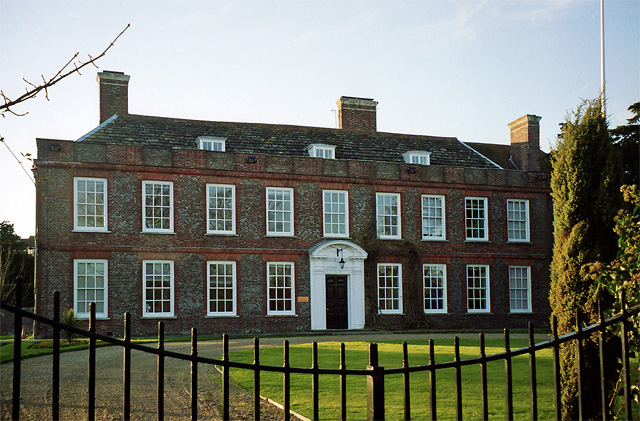

- Location within East Sussex
- 50.882262°N 0.012187°E
- Location: Church Lane, Lewes, East Sussex BN21 1EB

Site notes
- Area: United Kingdom

Listed Building – Grade I
- Official name: Malling House
- Designated: 25 February 1952
- Reference no.: 1043904

Malling House is a 17th-century country house in Lewes, East Sussex, England. It is a Grade I listed building and serves as the headquarters of Sussex Police.

The house was built in red and grey brick in the mid–17th century for the Spence family, extended in the late 17th century, refronted circa 1720–1726 and extended again in the 20th century. It is built in two storeys with attics and cellars with a roof of Horsham slabs. The frontage has 9 regular bays and a Tuscan door frame with pediment. To the right of the building is a 20th-century extension.

It was acquired by the East Sussex Constabulary in 1948 for use as the police force headquarters, passing in turn in 1968 to the newly formed Sussex Constabulary to be used for the same purpose.

== Residents ==
Malling House is estimated to have been built in about 1660. William Spence (1621–1671) bought this estate in 1656 from Thomas Lucas so it is therefore probable that he was the originator of the house. However, there is evidence that he used an existing building as part of the new house.

William Spence was a barrister and landowner. He was called to the bar in 1644 and in 1648 he married Mary Short daughter of Samuel Short a lawyer of Tenterden. At the time of his marriage William's father Robert Spence settled Moor Hall near Ardeley upon him. He later inherited from a cousin Houndean Manor (now demolished) which was near Lewes.

William did not have any children so when he died his brother John Spence (1624–1691) inherited the house. He had married Ruth Stapley (1629–1693), daughter of John Stapley of Hickstead. When he died in 1691 the house was inherited by his eldest son John Spence (1663–1713). This son married three times. His first wife was Mary Fagg, daughter of Sir John Fagge of Whiston. His second wife was Dorothy Roberts, daughter of Sir Rowland Roberts of Glastonbury and his third wife was Ann Trevor, daughter of Sir John Trevor, Secretary of State.

After his death in 1713 his son John Spence (1683–1741) became the owner. He married twice. His first wife was Byne Walker (1691–1721), daughter of and coheiress of Sir George Walker. His second wife was Gratiana Cox (1695–1777), daughter of Sir Charles Cox of Southwark. This couple made substantial alterations and additions to the house in 1726. To commemorate their work they added an ornamental panel to the lead downpipe which can be seen at this reference. On the left are the initials J and G at the bottom and S on the top. On the right is the date 1726.

Luke Spence (1713–1800), the eldest son and his wife Henrietta inherited the house in 1741. His son Henry Spence (1747–1824) and his wife Phillipa became the owners in 1800. The last owner of the Spence family was Henry Hume Spence (1775–1842). He was a captain in the Royal Navy and did not live at the house. Instead it was rented to several wealthy tenants one of whom was Countess Anne Pelham widow of Thomas Pelham, 1st Earl of Chichester.

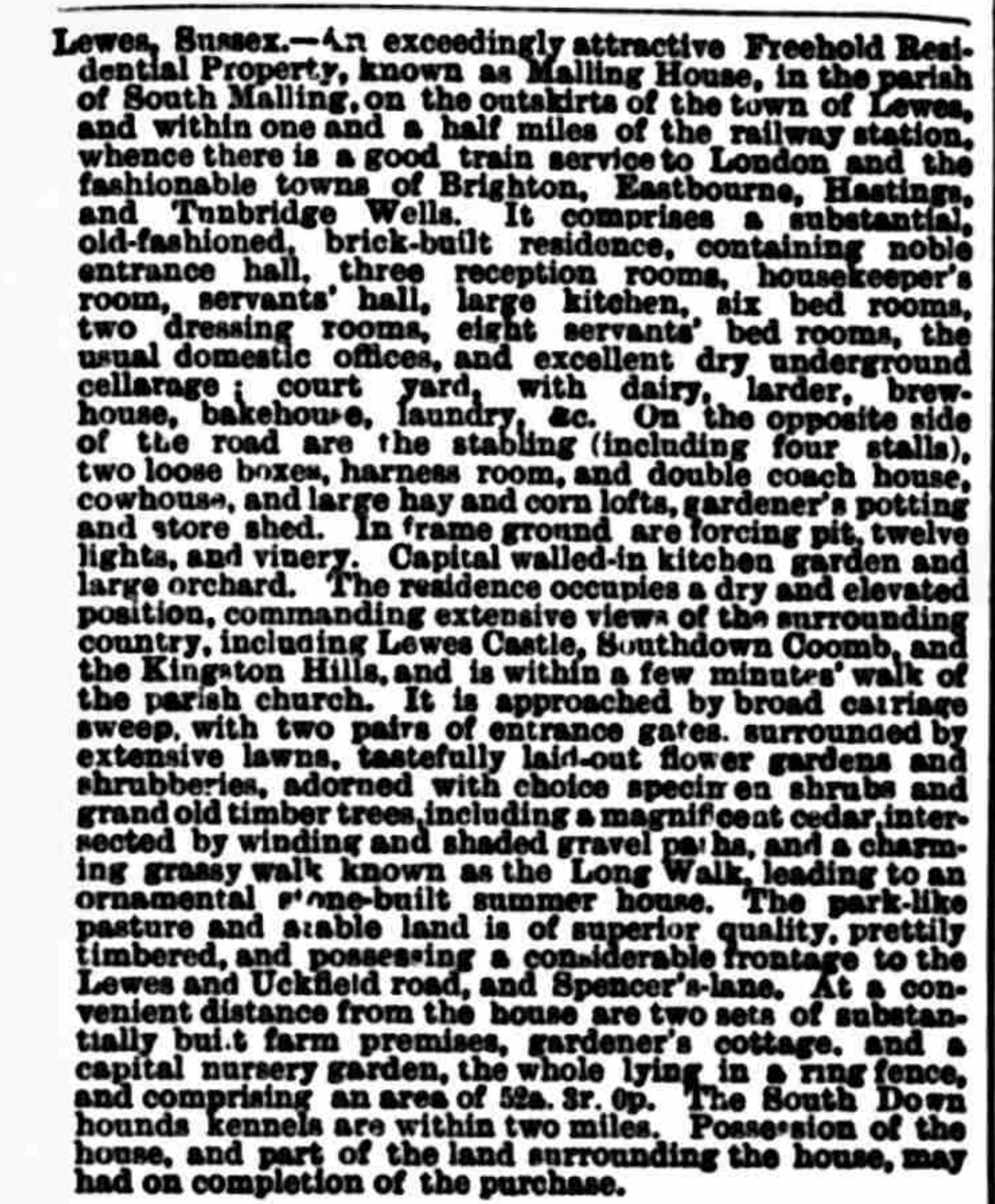
Sale notice for Malling House 1878

Reverend Peter Guerin Crofts (1775–1859) was a tenant from about 1827. When Henry Hume Spence died in 1842 he bought the house from the Trustees of the estate. Reverend Crofts was appointed as the curate of St Michael's South Malling in 1805. He married twice. His first wife was Harriet Campion, daughter of William Campion of Lewes. However she died in childbirth in 1813, a year after their marriage. His second wife was Elizabeth Frederica Law, daughter of Ewan Law of Horsted Place in Little Horsted. Both of his wives had generous marriage settlements and he inherited property from his uncle. This meant that he was very wealthy so he lived the life of a country gentleman with an interest in fox hunting. This sometimes made him unpopular with some of his parishioners who thought he should live as a clergyman. When he died in 1859 his wife Elizabeth continued to live at the house until her death in 1878. The house was then advertised for sale. The advertisement is shown.

The house was bought by Philip Horace Molineux who was a banker. He did not immediately move into the house but instead rented it to wealthy tenants until about 1900. He then moved to Malling House and lived there with two servants until about 1909. After that he then sold the house to Reginald Henry Powell (1851–1933). He was a partner in the firm Powell and Co, land and house agents. He and his wife Alice lived there until 1923 when it was sold to Sir George Menteth Boughey.

Sir George Menteth Boughey, CBE, 9th Baronet (1879–1959) was Under Secretary to the Government in Punjab. In 1913 he married Noel Evelyn Glass (1888–1974) who was the daughter of James Glass an engineer in India. The couple had five children. The eldest was Hermia Boughey (1914–2003) who was nine years old when the family came to live at Malling House. In later years she wrote a book in which she describes her feelings about living there. She said:

"We would not, once we had seen Malling, have exchanged it for any other house in the world. For Malling was, quite simply, our idea of perfection…Malling stood in the pleasant Sussex country north of Lewes, with the Ouse flowing unhurriedly at the bottom of the fields behind the house, and bringing with it at high tide the tang of salt air from the sea".

She also recalled cricket on the lawn, reading aloud around the fire on winter evenings, games of hide and seek in the darkened house.

Sir George Boughey sold the house in 1947 to the East Sussex County Council for the then East Sussex Constabulary.
