= Giles York =

British Chief Constable

Giles Tristan York QPM (born February 1967) is a retired British police officer.

York studied at Durham University. He started his career with Kent Police in 1990. He was appointed Chief Constable of Sussex Police in 2014, and served in this position until his retirement in 2020.

York received the Queen's Police Medal in 2015. He is a deputy lieutenant of East Sussex.

== Honours ==

Ribbon	Description	Notes
	Queen's Police Medal (QPM)	
	Queen Elizabeth II Golden Jubilee Medal	
	Queen Elizabeth II Diamond Jubilee Medal	
	Police Long Service and Good Conduct Medal	

Police appointments
Preceded by Martin Richards	Chief Constable of Sussex Police; 2014–2020	Succeeded by Jo Shiner
