= West Sussex Constabulary =

Police force of West Sussex, England from 1857 to 1968

The West Sussex Constabulary was the territorial police force responsible for policing West Sussex in southern England from 1857 to 1968. Its headquarters were located at Chichester.

== History ==
The West Sussex Constabulary was formed in 1857 and the headquarters established in Chichester in 1922.

During the Second World War the force, together with that of the East Sussex Constabulary and the borough forces of Brighton, Hove, Eastbourne and Hastings, temporarily amalgamated in 1943 to form the Sussex Police Force. After the war, the forces reverted in 1947 to their previous formation, except that Hove remained as part of East Sussex Constabulary.

During the post-war years a number of specialist units were created, including Criminal Investigation (CID), Drugs, Special Branch, Policewomen, Firearms, etc.

On 1 January 1968 the West Sussex force was re-amalgamated with those of East Sussex, Brighton, Eastbourne and Hastings to form the Sussex Constabulary, renamed the Sussex Police in 1974.

=== Chief constables ===
Chief constables were:

- 1857–1879 : Capt. Frederick Montgomerie
- 1879–1912 : Capt. George R. Drummond, MVO
- 1912–1934 : Capt. Arthur Williams, MVO, OBE
- 1935–1964 : Ronald Paterson Wilson, OBE
- 1964–1967 : Thomas Christopher Williams

== West Sussex Constabulary Roll of Honour ==
A list of officers of West Sussex Constabulary who died on duty (in progress) is provided by the national police charity, the Police Roll of Honour Trust.

Name	Rank	Age	Date of death	Circumstances
William James Avis, DCM	Sgt	47	26 February 1942	Shot on duty
