= Samuel Meredith (police officer) =

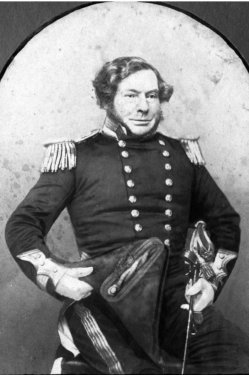
Captain Samuel Meredith, RN

Captain Samuel Meredith (5 August 1794 – June 1873) was the first person to be appointed to the rank of Chief Constable in the United Kingdom when he was appointed to that rank in the newly formed Wiltshire Constabulary in November 1839. This occurred after a distinguished career in the Royal Navy.

== Naval career ==
Meredith was born in Dedham in Essex in 1796, the only child of elderly parents who lived in West Ham. His father, Joseph Meredith, had been the superintendent of the local excise officers, but he was retired by the time of his son's birth. In 1804 aged 10 years Samuel Meredith ran away from his school at Greenwich and could not be found. He was eventually traced to a ship at Portsmouth where he had asked to be taken on as the cabin boy. John S. Dyer, a family friend who was Chief Clerk at the Admiralty and Secretary of Greenwich Hospital (and who would later become his father-in-law), obtained a position for Meredith as a midshipman aboard a ship in the Royal Navy. He then sailed to the Indian Ocean and did not return home until 1809.

He married Lydia Eliza Dyer (1796–1881) on 21 June 1829. He was then a Lieutenant in the Royal Navy attached to the Plymouth division. They had two children: Mary DeSaumarey Leslie Meredith (1826–1901) and Lydia Eliza Dyer Meredith (1830–1925). Soon after the birth of his oldest daughter in 1826 he was appointed to the command of the ketch HMS Vigilant. When that posting ended Meredith requested a shore appointment, and he was given the command at Gosport in July 1830; this posting ended in 1833. From 1835 to 1838 Meredith was Inspecting Commander of the Swanage Coast Guard District in Dorset, where he was in charge of the excise men who covered the area from Lulworth Cove to Bournemouth.

== Chief Constable ==
The County Police Act 1839 gave the counties of England and Wales the opportunity to establish full-time police forces, headed by a Chief Constable who was appointed by the Justices of the Peace of the county. The first county to implement this was Wiltshire Constabulary, which appointed Meredith its first Chief Constable on 28 November 1839. Thirteen candidates were interviewed out of which four were short-listed for consideration by the Quarter Sessions. The four short-listed applicants were all military officers from the Army and Navy. They were: Captain Calder, Captain Edwards, Lieutenant Hill and Commander Samuel Meredith. On his retirement from the Royal Navy in order to take up his new appointment Commander Meredith was promoted to the rank of Captain.

Following his appointment Meredith placed an advertisement in the Wiltshire Gazette on 19 December 1839 to recruit police men who should be..."under forty years of age.... stand five feet six inches without shoes [be able to] read and write and keep accounts... to be free from any bodily complaint, of strong constitution and generally intelligent".

The new recruits began their duties in January 1840. By the end of March 1840 the Wiltshire Force had 12 Superintendents and 170 men, of which 40 were stationed in towns and 120 in rural districts.

In 1843 Chief Constable Meredith purchased horses and carts to transport prisoners and police officers to and from the courts and prisons. The carts were also used for transporting stores and equipment. Meredith had to provide his own coach although he was allowed the services of a constable to act as a coachman.

== Road Hill House Murder ==
When in June 1860 the body of three-year-old Francis Saville Kent was found dumped in an outside privy used by the servants in the garden of his family's house in the small village of Rode (then in Wiltshire), local Police Superintendent Foley believed that the nursemaid, Elizabeth Gough, who had responsibility for Francis Kent, who slept in her room, was involved in the murder. His theory was that she and a lover, possibly the child's father, had woken the child up and had killed him in order to silence him.

Dissatisfied by the lack of progress of Superintendent Foley and his men, the local magistrates asked the Home Office for assistance from Scotland Yard without the agreement of Captain Meredith. It was only after a second request was received that Detective Inspector Jack Whicher, then the most senior and well known of the detectives at Scotland Yard, was sent. He quickly arrested the dead boy's sixteen-year-old half-sister, Constance Kent.

== Final years ==
In his later years his health began to fail and he became less active, and in 1870 aged 76 Meredith retired as Chief Constable, having held that post for 31 years.

He died in June 1873 at Bradford on Avon in Wiltshire.
