= Joseph McCulloch (artist) =

British painter

Joseph Ridley Radcliffe McCulloch (1893 - 1961) A.R.W.S., N.S., A.R.C.A. was a British artist from Leeds who worked in Ipswich and London. He exhibited at the Royal Academy and taught at several art colleges. His works are held in several public and private collections. He is notable as the artist of the first picture of a woman naval officer added to the collection of the Royal Museums Greenwich in London.

McCulloch was born in Leeds, West Yorkshire in Britain in 1893. He studied art at the Leeds College of Art and then the Royal Cambrian Academy from 1912 until 1915. After 1918 he spent time at the Académie Colarossi, an art school in Paris. In the 1920s he was based in Ipswich and taught painting at the Ipswich School of Art. He was a member of the Ipswich Fine Art Club from 1923 until 1928. During this decade he also exhibited at the Royal Academy. He then moved to London, living in Chelsea and Clapham in London and held a position at Clapham School of Art but by 1939 was based at Great Cheyne Studio in Chelsea. He became an Associate of the Royal Watercolour Society and of the Royal College of Art.

He was noted for working as a watercolorist, draftsman and etcher. His works are held in several public galleries and museums such as the Aberdeen Archives, Galleries and Museums and his portrait of Tony Smith GC is in the Imperial War Museums collections A print of a photograph of him made in 1954 by Howard Coster is held in the National Portrait Gallery, London.

In 2023 his pastel drawing of an anonymous Wren officer was acquired by the Royal Museums Greenwich in London. This was the first art work of a woman naval officer in the museum's collections (apart from Queens and wives of officers).

In 1934 he married Ethel Louisa Stone, an artist's model. In his later years he moved back to Leeds and died in Rothwell, Yorkshire on 9 November 1961.
