= East Sussex Constabulary =

Defunct police force

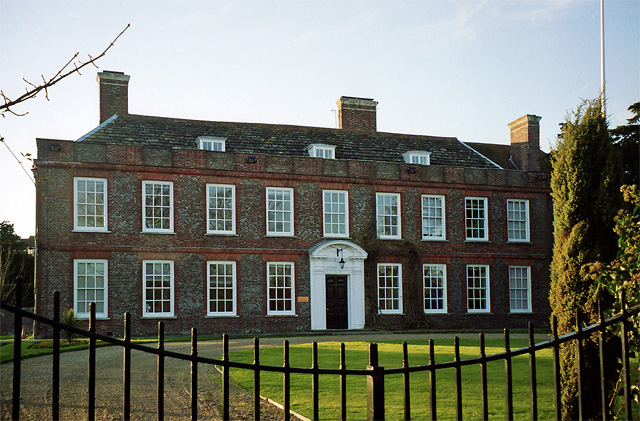
Malling House, a Grade I listed building.

East Sussex Constabulary was the territorial police force responsible for policing East Sussex in southern England from 1840 to 1968. Its headquarters were located at Malling House, Lewes, East Sussex.

== History ==
East Sussex Constabulary was formed in 1840 and covered the area of East Sussex except for the boroughs of Brighton, Hove, Eastbourne and Hastings, which were served by their own borough police forces. During the Second World War these forces, together with West Sussex Constabulary, were temporarily amalgamated in 1943 to form the Sussex Police Force. After the war, the forces reverted in 1947 to their previous formation, except that Hove remained part of East Sussex Constabulary, whose headquarters were relocated to Malling House, Lewes in 1948. In addition there were divisional headquarters at East Grinstead, Lewes, Bexhill and Hove.

During the post-war years a number of specialist units were created, including Criminal Investigation (CID), Drugs, Special Branch, Policewomen, Firearms, etc.

On 1 January 1968 the East Sussex forces were re-amalgamated with those of West Sussex to form the Sussex Constabulary, renamed the Sussex Police in 1974.

=== Chief Constables ===
Chief Constables were:

- 1840–1881: Lt-Colonel Henry Fowler Mackay
- 1881–1894 : Major George Bentinck Luxford
- 1894–1920 : Major Hugh Lang
- 1920–1936 : Lt. Col George Ormerod, DSO
- 1936–1965 (except 1943–1947) : Reginald Breffit, OBE
- 1966–1967 : George Walter Roberts Terry, OBE
- 1968 : East Sussex merged with West Sussex, Brighton, Eastbourne and Hastings Constabularies to form Sussex Constabulary
