= Antonio Smith =

Antonio Smith may refer to:

- Antonio Smith (artist) (1832–1877), Chilean landscape painter and caricaturist
- Antonio Smith (athlete) (born 1967), Venezuelan hurdler
- Antonio Smith (defensive end) (born 1981), American football defensive end
- Antonio Smith (cornerback) (born 1984), American football cornerback
- Antonio Arnelo Smith, involved in an alleged police brutality incident in Valdosta, Georgia, in 2020
- Antonio Smith (basketball), university basketball player from Flint, Michigan

== See also ==
- Tony Smith (disambiguation)
