= Anthony Smith (French politician) =

French politician (born 1975)

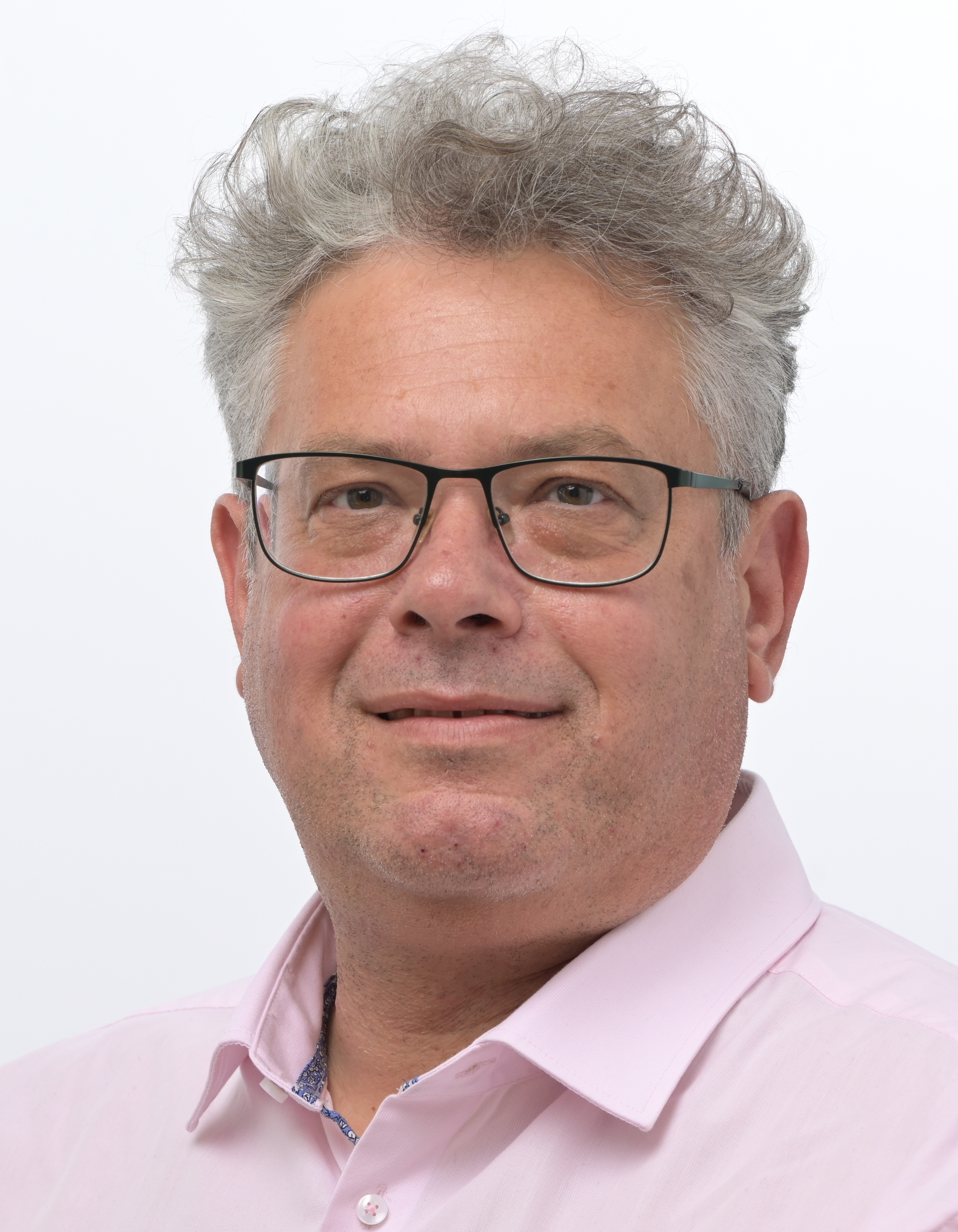
- Official portrait, 2024

Member of the European Parliament for France
- Incumbent
- Assumed office 16 July 2024

Personal details
- Born: 3 April 1975 (age 51) Soissons, France
- Party: LFI (since 2018)
- Other political affiliations: LCR (until 2009); NPA (2009–2011); Ensemble! (2011–2018)
- Occupation: Trade unionist • Politician

Anthony Smith (born 3 April 1975) is a French politician who was first elected as a Member of the European Parliament in 2024.
