= Elizabeth Neville (police officer) =

British police officer

Dame Elizabeth Neville, DBE, QPM, DL, (born 5 February 1953) is a former High Sheriff of Wiltshire (2010) and a former Chief Constable of Wiltshire Police.

== Career ==
Neville was appointed Chief Constable of Wiltshire in 1997 and retired from the force on 17 September 2004. She was only the second woman chief constable in the United Kingdom, and the youngest in the rank at that time. She is a Deputy Lieutenant for Wiltshire.

She is or has also been:

- Patron of Wiltshire Community Foundation (current)
- Deputy Lieutenant of Wiltshire (current)
- An Independent Adjudicator of Companies House (current)
- Appeal Officer for Community Interest Companies (current)
- Member of Investment Business Committee of Institute of Chartered Accountants in England and Wales (ICAEW)(current)
- Member of Regulatory Decisions Committee of the Financial Conduct Authority (former)
- Member of Determinations Panel for the Pensions Regulator (former)
- Non-Executive Director of The Insolvency Service (former)
- Lay Member of the Independent Appeals Body for Phone-paid Service Authority (former)
- Trustee Wiltshire & Swindon Community Foundation (former)
- Trustee Wiltshire Bobby Van Trust (former)
- Vice Chair of Board of Trustees of Cumberland Lodge (former)
- Non-Executive Director of the Serious Fraud Office (former)
- Member of the Civil Nuclear Police Authority (former)
- Member of the Police Appeals Tribunal (former)
- Complaints Assessor for the Agencies of the Department for Transport (former)
- Independent Complaints Adjudicator for the Assets Recovery Agency (former)
- Director of Ajay Shopfit Maintenance Ltd (former)
- Vice chair of Board of Governors Stonar School (former)

Police appointments
Preceded by Walter Girven	Chief Constable of Wiltshire Police; 1997–2004	Succeeded by Martin Richards
