= Anthony Smith (rescuer) =

George Cross recipient (1894–1964)

Anthony Smith GC
- Born: 3 August 1894; Christchurch, Hampshire
- Died: 1964 (age 70)
- Burial place: North Sheen Cemetery, Richmond, London
- Military career
- Allegiance: United Kingdom
- Branch: Civil Defence Service
- Nickname: Tony
- Conflicts: World War I World War II
- Awards: George Cross

Anthony Smith GC (3 August 1894 – 1964) was awarded the George Cross for "outstanding gallantry and devotion to duty in conditions of the utmost danger and difficulty" on 23 February 1944 in rescuing people from a bomb damaged building in the World's End area of Chelsea, London. A chimney sweep and shoemaker by trade, he was attached to the Chelsea Division of the Civil Defence Rescue Service.

== First World War ==
At the outbreak of war in 1914, Smith enlisted in the Royal Marines Light Infantry, Chatham Division. He was posted to the Royal Marine Brigade of the Royal Naval Division and participated in the landings at ANZAC Cove in April 1915. Smith suffered a foot injury that required his evacuation to Chatham.

By December, Smith had recovered and rejoined his old battalion in France, where he fought in numerous actions including the Somme offensive of 1916. Smith's service in the War came to an end after a serious hand injury requiring amputation of three fingers resulted in invalidation from the Navy in August 1917.

Anthony Smith returned to civilian life as a nightwatchman but returned to the family trade of chimney sweep in 1926.

== Second World War ==
Smith tried to re-enlist on the outbreak of war in 1939 but his injury prevented this and instead had joined the Heavy Rescue Service based at Chatham, Kent.

== 23 February 1944 ==
On the night of 23 February 1944, a lone German aircraft dropped two bombs, probably aimed at Lots Road Power Station. The bombs missed this target and fell on The Guinness Trust buildings on the corner of Edith Grove and King's Road.

The force of the explosion collapsed the buildings. Smith arrived soon after with the Heavy Rescue Squad. Many injured people were trapped in the fallen masonry and rubble and Smith heard the cries of one of them, a baker called Sam Mitchell, trapped in the basement.

Entering the basement through a gap in the debris, Smith was soon also trapped inside by further rubble. Smith persevered and located Mitchell in the rubble, freed him and dragged him to the rear of the building where he broke through a wall to safety.

Smith then joined his colleague Albert Littlejohn and re-entered the basement, which was being flooded with water from a broken main and rescued a woman. Smith and his colleagues worked all night freeing victims and recovering bodies.

In all, 76 people died that night but many others were rescued thanks to Tony Smith, Albert Littlejohn and their colleagues from the Heavy Rescue Squad.

== George Cross citation ==
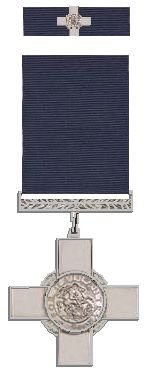
George Cross and its ribbon bar

Smith was awarded the George Cross on 30 May 1944 and made a Freeman of the Borough of Chelsea in June of the same year.

On 25th February 1944 a stick of bombs fell on the 'World’s End' area of Chelsea destroying a four storey building. Only the shell was left standing and gas and water mains had been fractured with the gas ignited and causing rubble and neighbouring buildings to catch fire. Two floors of the building had pan caked.

Smith went into the rubble and started to tunnel reaching a casualty trapped in the front basement. Having released the victim from the debris the buildings condition had become even more precarious with the front of the building now a solid sheet of flame added with the building still crumbling around him his escape route was now blocked.

Smith carried the casualty to the rear through the smoke and fire of the building where he found a small hole to freedom. Smith again frantically burrowed away to make a whole big enough to escape the inferno. After passing the casualty through the hole, one of the main walls of the building collapsed. Smith escaped but most of his hair and eyebrows had been burned from his head.

Almost overcome by the fumes and smoke Smith went to the next building to help a colleague who was attempting to rescue a woman who was trapped in that building’s basement. The building was in a similar condition to the first one Smith had entered and he worked for up to an hour in waist deep water to help effect the rescue of the woman.

Smith carried on working with the rest of his crew throughout the rest of his shift until they were relieved sometime later.

— London Gazette

=== Plaque ===
A plaque commemorating Smith's bravery on 23 February 1944 is located on Dovehouse Green, on the King's Road in Chelsea. A portrait of him by Joseph McCulloch is held in the Imperial War Museums.

Post-war, Smith resumed his job as a chimney sweep and died a bachelor in 1964.

== Burial ==
Smith was initially buried in an unmarked grave. In 1999 a new stone was dedicated by arrangement of the Royal Marines Association and supported by the Victoria Cross and George Cross Association, the Royal Marines Historical Societies and representatives from the Royal Borough of Kensington and Chelsea.

== Sale of medals ==
Smith's medals were sold at auction in Sydney, Australia in April 2005 for AUS$20,000. His medals included:

- George Cross
- 1914–15 Star
- British War Medal 1914-18 (CH.18816 A.Smith. Pte. R.M.)
- Victory Medal (CH.18816 A.Smith. Pte. R.M.)
- Defence Medal
- Coronation Medal 1953

== See also ==
- Pathe News item featuring Tony Smith shortly after his investiture
