= Anthony Smith (Australian footballer) =

Australian rules footballer

Personal information
- Full name: Anthony Smith
- Born: 12 April 1951 (age 75)
- Original team: Murrumbeena Districts
- Height: 188 cm (6 ft 2 in)
- Weight: 85 kg (187 lb)

Playing career^{1}
Years	Club	Games (Goals)
1969, 1972	Richmond	4 (1)
- ^{1} Playing statistics correct to the end of 1972.

Anthony Smith (born 12 April 1951) is a former Australian rules footballer who played for the Richmond Football Club in the Victorian Football League (VFL).
