= Tony Smith (civil servant) =

British civil servant

Tony Smith CBE
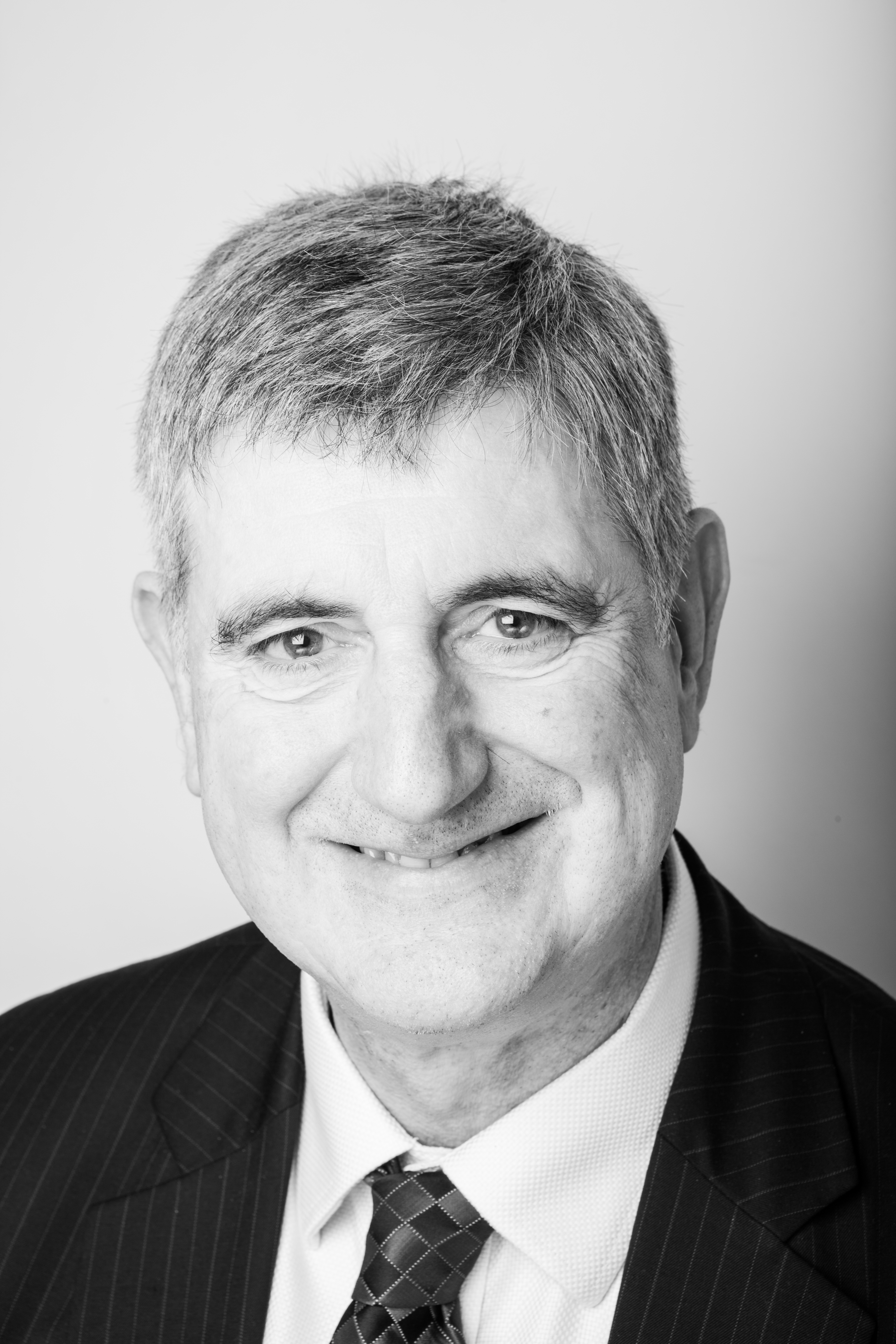
- Tony Smith in 2017

Interim Director General of the UK Border Force
- In office 19 September 2012 – 2013

Personal details
- Born: Anthony John Smith; 8 December 1953 (age 72) London, England

Anthony John Smith CBE is a British civil servant who served as the Director General of the UK Border Force. He was previously Gold Commander for the London 2012 Olympic Programme and Regional Director for London and the South East in the UK Border Agency.

He was also Head of Border Control in the UK Immigration Service between 2005 and 2007 and Head of Ports and Border Management in Citizenship and Immigration Canada between 2000 and 2003.

Smith was appointed Commander of the Order of the British Empire (CBE) in the 2013 New Year Honours for services to the safety and security of the London 2012 Olympic Games.

Smith retired from public service on 31 March 2013 after over 40 years with the Home Office. He was succeeded by Sir Charles Montgomery.

Upon his retirement from public service Tony Smith became Managing Director of Fortinus Global Ltd, a global border security company.

He is a regular expert commentator on global border management and security practices in the British media and chairs expert panels on border and immigration conferences around the world including the International Summit on Borders in Washington DC with former US CBP Commissioner Rob Bonner and at Secure Document World in London

He became International Liaison Director at Borderpol in 2013 but resigned in 2016.

Smith is the founder and chairman of the International Border Management and Technologies Association (IBMATA).

Tony Smith was appointed as a member of the Expert Panel to the Parliamentary Commission for Alternative Arrangements for the Irish Border in April 2019.

In May 2020, Smith called for a program similar to Australia's Operation Sovereign Borders to reduce illegal immigration to the United Kingdom.

Police appointments
Preceded by Brian Moore	Director General of UK Border Force (Interim); 2012–2013	Succeeded by Sir Charles Montgomery
