= Tony Smith (footballer, born 1952) =

Australian rules footballer

Personal information
- Full name: Anthony Joseph Smith
- Nickname: Joey
- Born: 22 January 1952 (age 74)
- Original team: Bealiba/St Pat's
- Height: 180 cm (5 ft 11 in)
- Weight: 70 kg (154 lb)
- Position: Wing

Playing career^{1}
Years	Club	Games (Goals)
1974	Carlton	2 (0)
- ^{1} Playing statistics correct to the end of 1974.

Anthony Smith (born 22 January 1952) is a former Australian rules footballer who played with Carlton in the Victorian Football League (VFL). He later played for Brunswick in the Victorian Football Association.
