= List of alumni of University College, Durham =

University alumni list

University College, Durham is one of the constituent colleges of Durham University. The following is a list of notable people to have matriculated at the college.

Where known, degree type, subject and year of graduation are included.

== Alumni ==
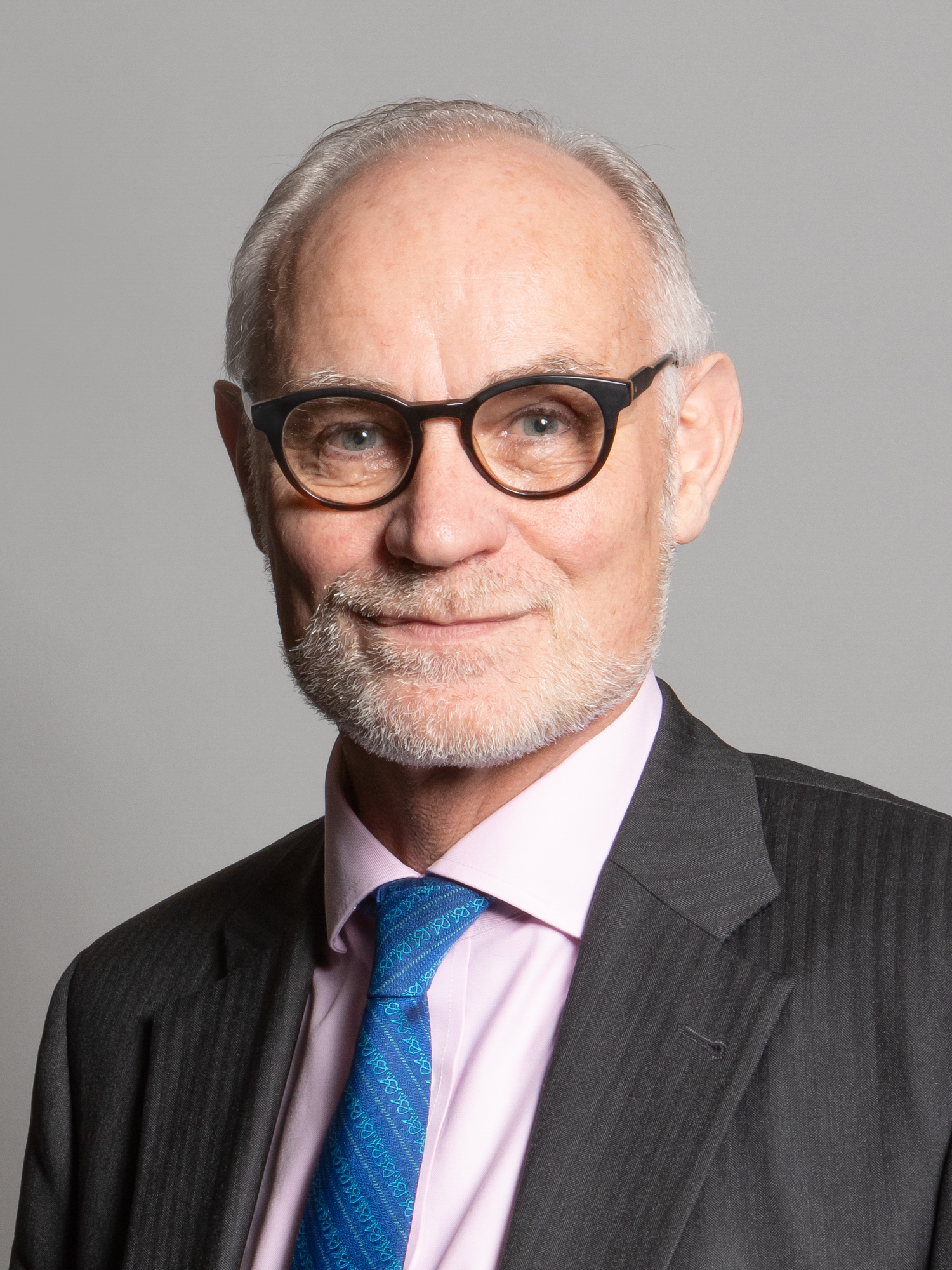
Crispin Blunt

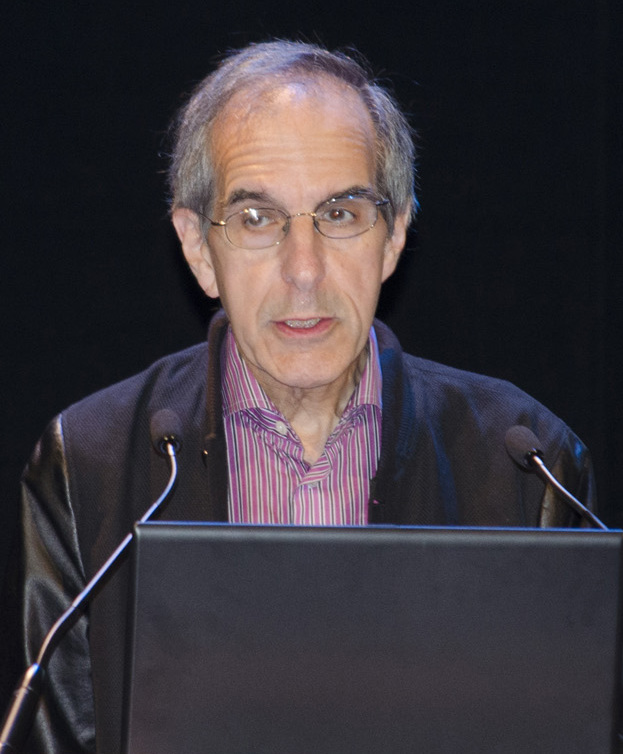
Cyrus Chothia

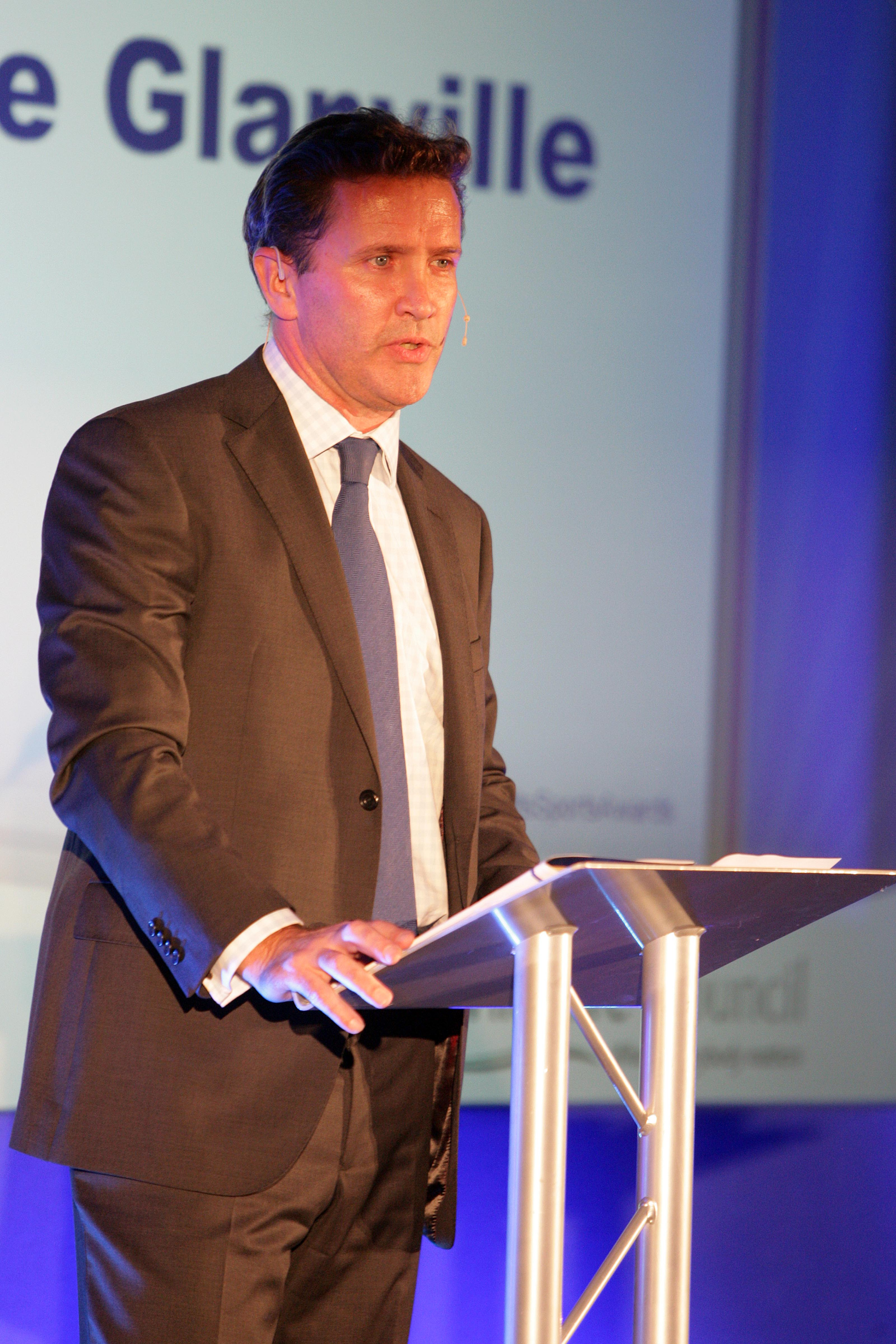
Phil de Glanville

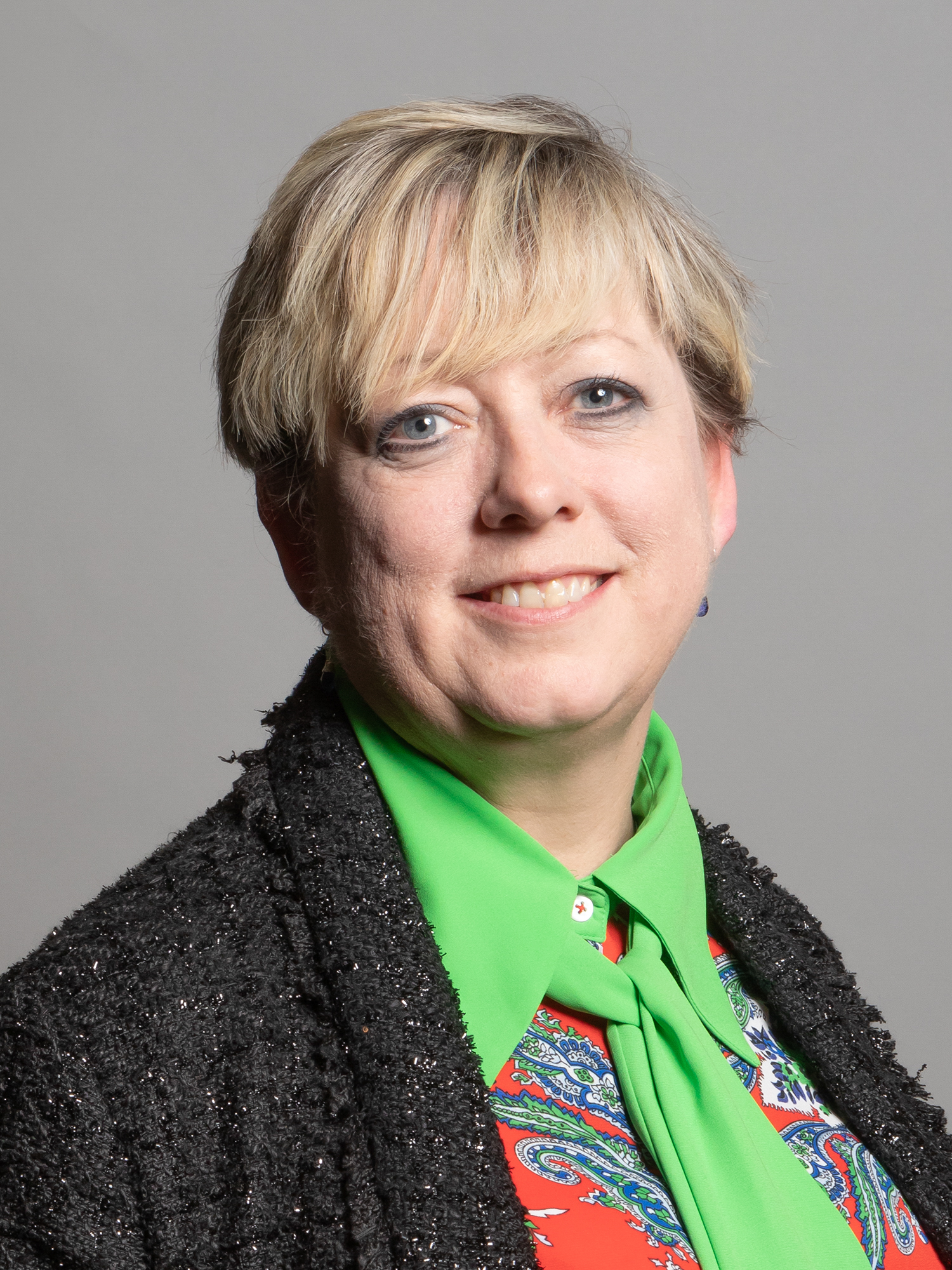
Jackie Doyle-Price

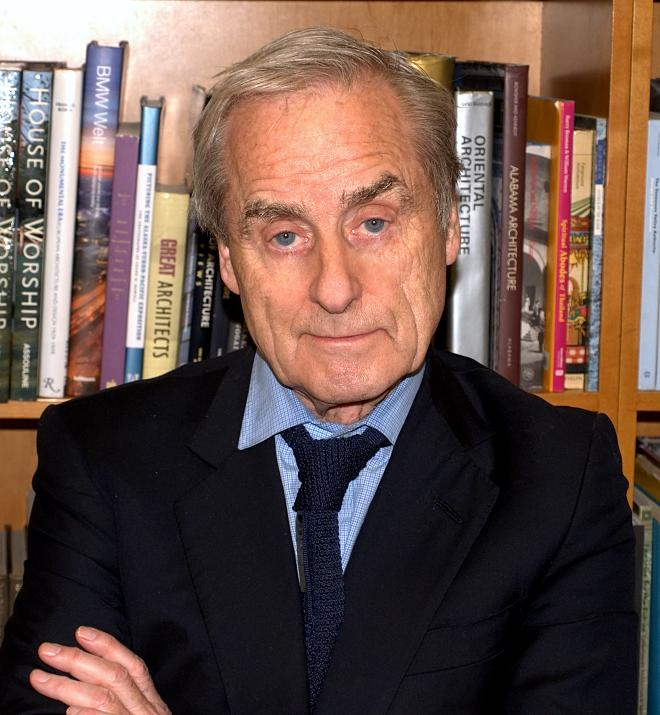
Harold Evans

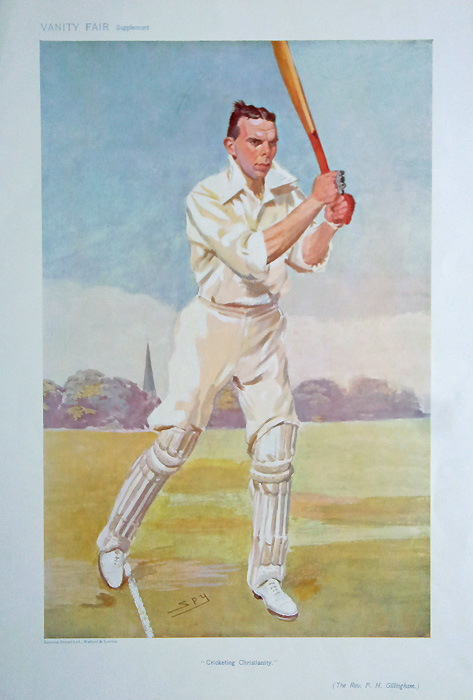
Frank Gillingham

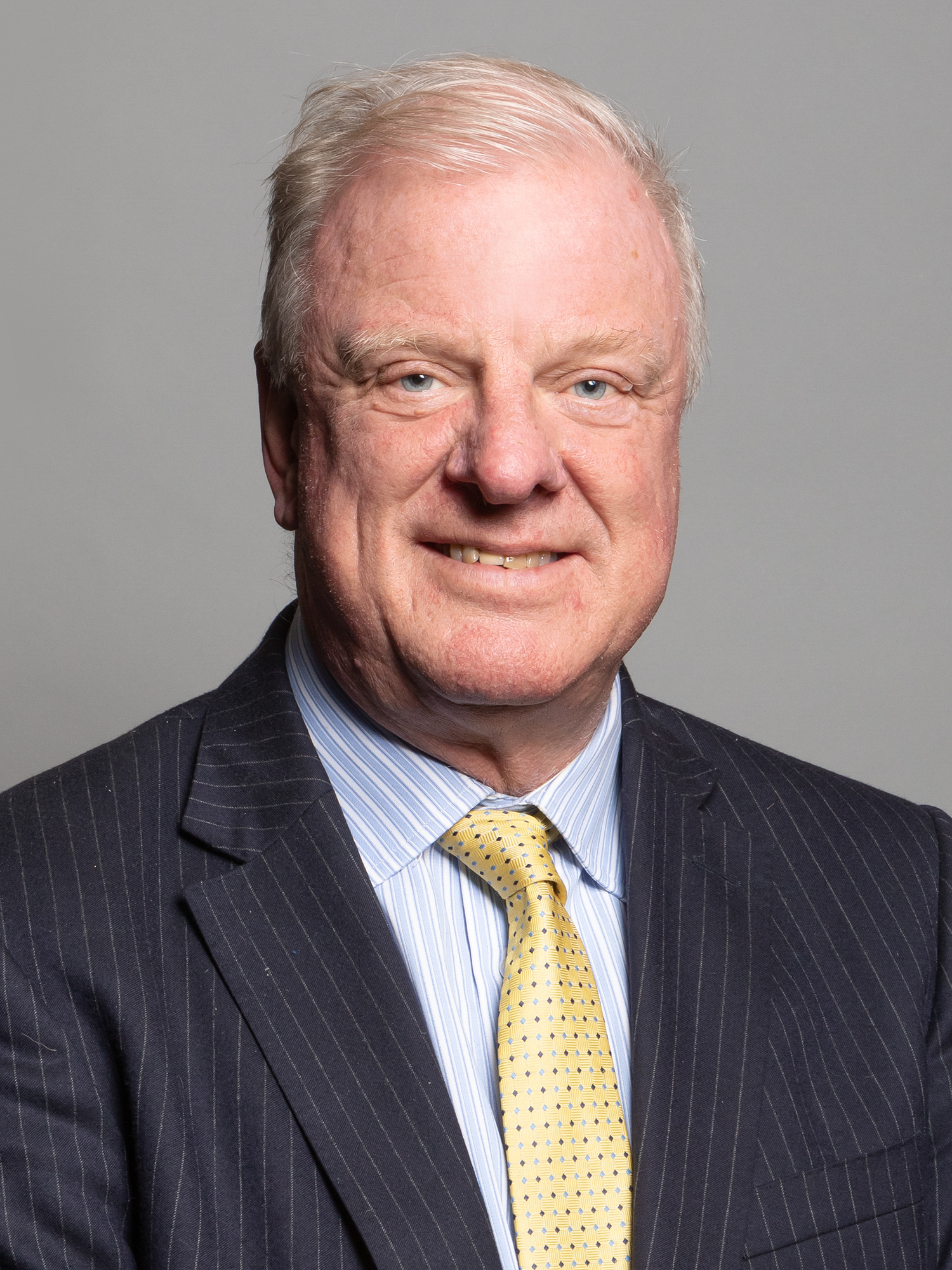
Edward Leigh

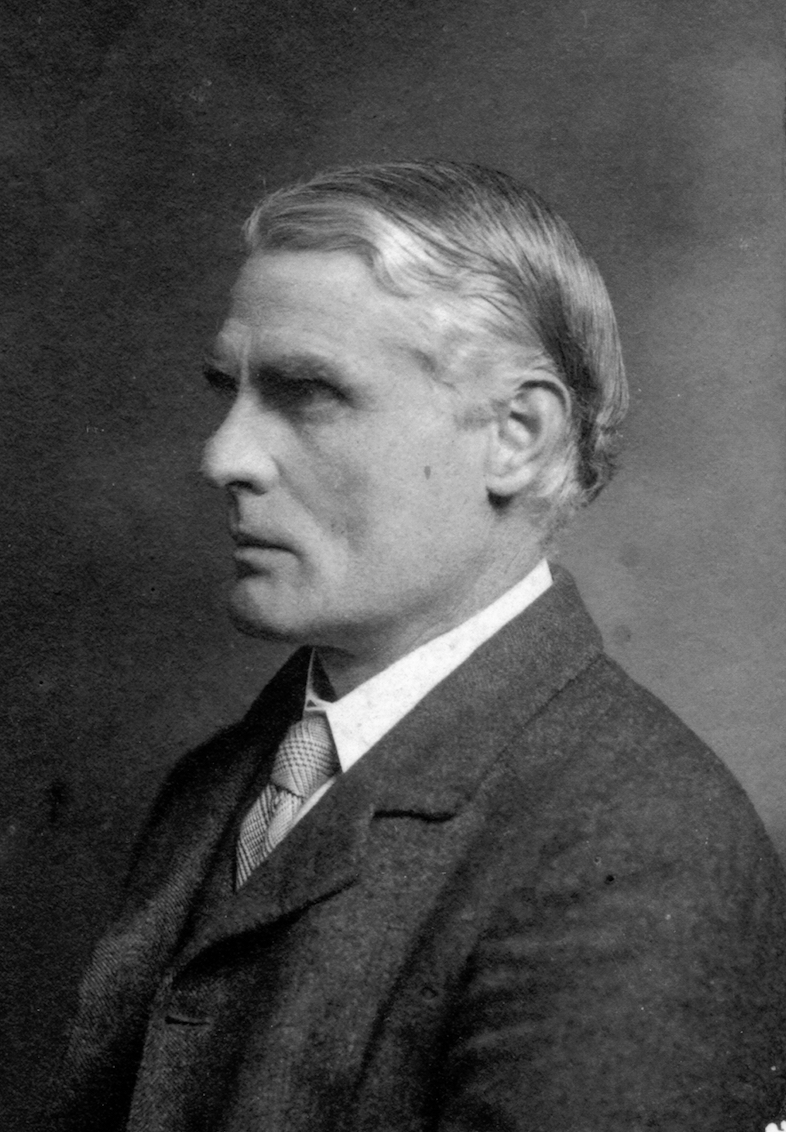
William Herrick Macaulay

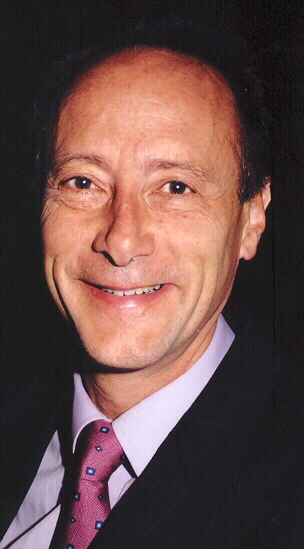
Piers Merchant

Edward Shortt

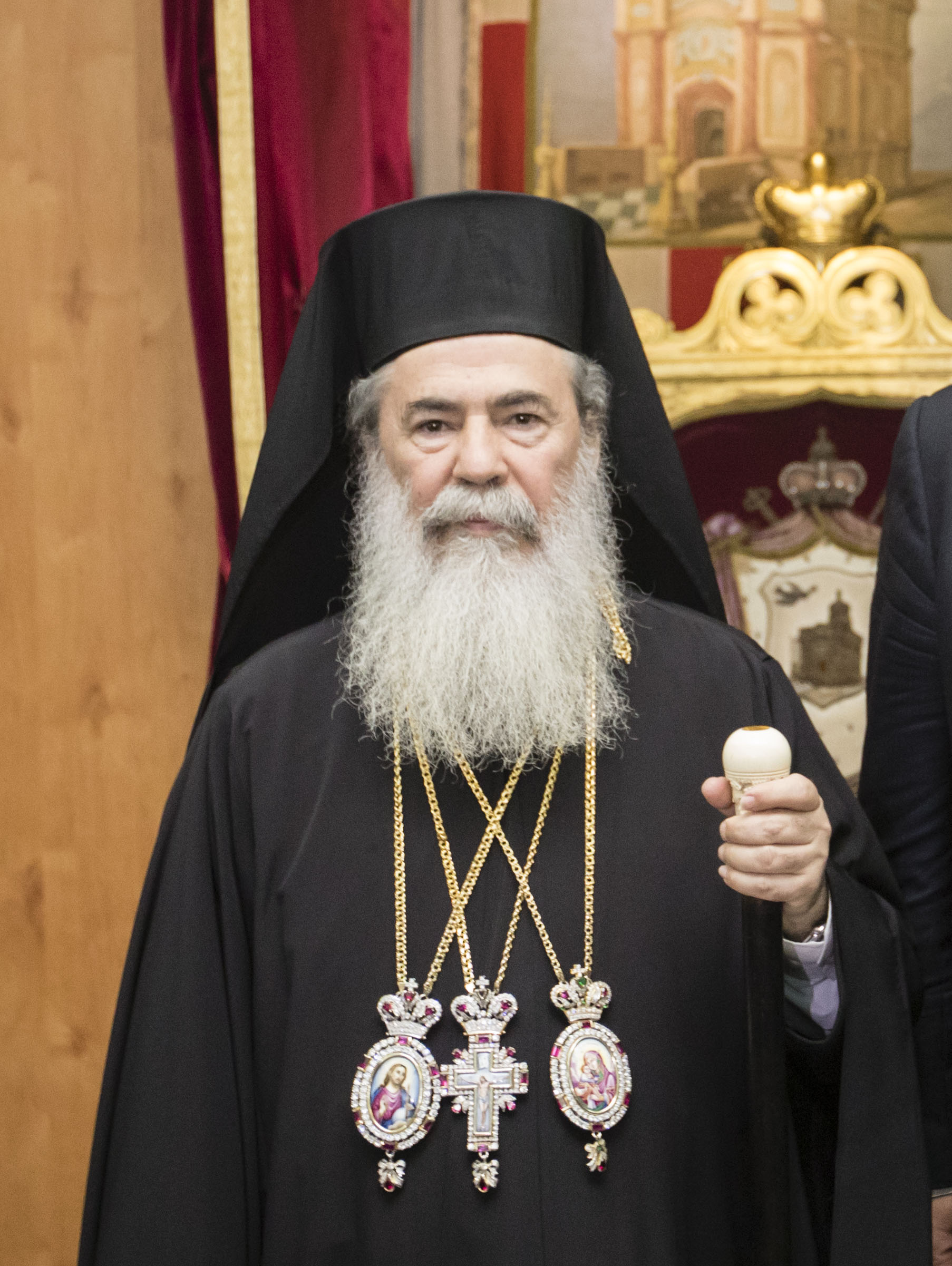
Patriarch Theophilos III of Jerusalem

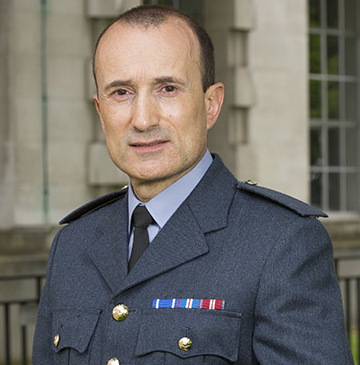
Garry Tunnicliffe

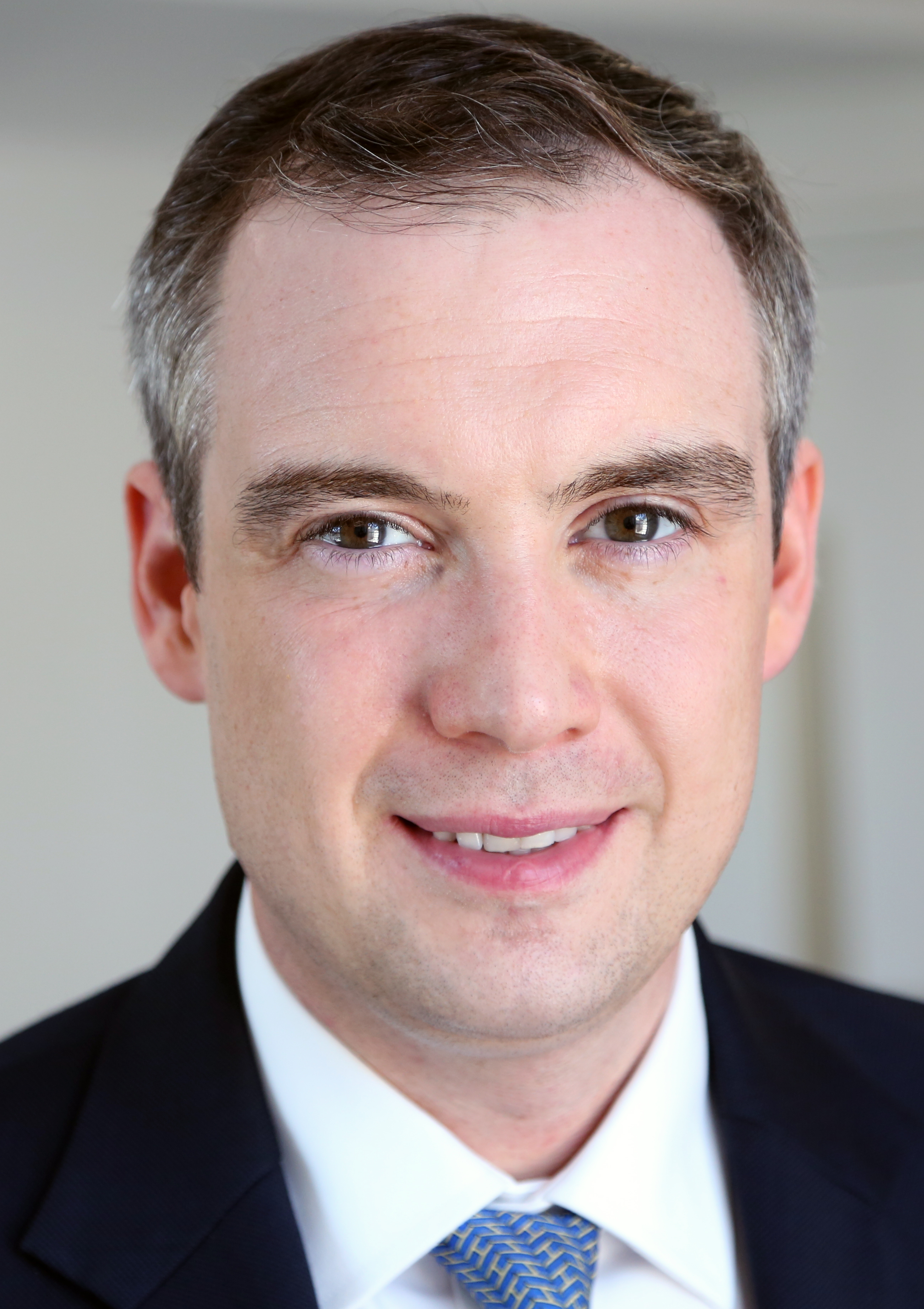
James Wharton, Baron Wharton of Yarm

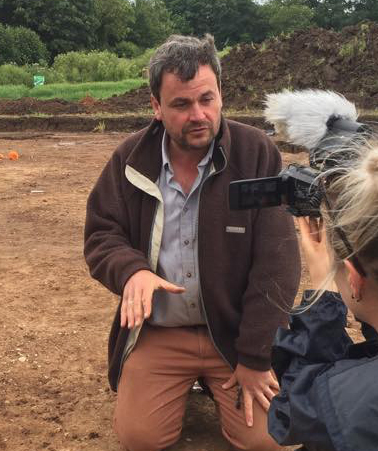
Hugh Willmott

- Walter Adams, Archbishop of Yukon
- Lancelot Addison, Archdeacon of Dorset (1948–1955)
- John Anthony Allan (BA Geography, 1958), geographer and winner of Stockholm Water Prize
- Simon Ardizzone (BA, 1988), producer and director, Hacking Democracy
- K. B. Asante, Ghanaian diplomat
- Tim Atkin (BA Modern Languages, 1984), journalist and Master of Wine
- Richard Ayre, former BBC journalist
- Nigel Badnell, physicist
- Edward Baran, British newsreader
- Rob Beckley, Assistant Commissioner in London Metropolitan Police
- Henry Bell, cricketer and clergyman
- Edward Bickersteth, clergyman
- Crispin Blunt
- John Henry Blunt
- Edward Bradley, clergyman and author known for The Adventures of Mr. Verdant Green
- Richard Brand, Archdeacon of Winchester
- David Breeze, archaeologist
- Eric Brereton, Dean of Glasgow and Galloway (1959–1962)
- Peter Bridgewater, Australian conservationist
- Aubrey Brocklebank, entrepreneur and aristocrat
- George Malcolm Brown, geologist
- Alex Burton, Royal Navy officer
- Clare Cameron, Ministry of Defence civil servant
- Peter Cardy, public servant
- Allan Cartner, continuity announcer for Border Television
- Jack Cattell
- Richard Dickinson Chambers, Professor of Chemistry at Durham
- Nicholas Chorley, 3rd Baron Chorley, British peer
- Cyrus Chothia (BSc, 1965), biochemist
- Frank Colquhoun, Church of England priest and author
- Rosemary Coogan, astronaut
- Harry Cook, martial artist
- Tim Crane, Professor of Philosophy at Central European University
- Mike Cunningham, Chief Executive of the College of Policing (2018–2020)
- William Curzon-Siggers, Anglican priest and author
- Owen Dampier Bennett
- Charles Maurice Davies
- Hunter Davies, author
- Phil de Glanville, England rugby player
- John Douglas
- Jackie Doyle Price
- Guy Edwards, Formula 1 racing driver
- George Entwistle, former BBC executive
- Harold Evans
- John Exelby, British television executive
- Christopher Foster
- James Freeling
- George Frodsham
- Edward Frossard
- Charles Furneaux, TV producer and Up participant
- Chris Gibson-Smith, businessman; Chairman of London Stock Exchange Group
- Guillaume, Hereditary Grand Duke of Luxembourg
- Frank Gillingham, cricketer
- Antony Good, cricketer
- John Goodall, historian and Architectural Editor of Country Life
- Roger Goodman, Nissan Professor of Modern Japanese Studies at the University of Oxford
- James Goss, High Court judge
- William Greenwell, antiquarian
- Miles Gregory, theatre director and producer
- Bill Gunston, aviation author
- Paul Lewis Hancock, geologist
- Ernest Hayes
- Samuel Heaslett
- James Henderson
- Allan Hill, demographer; Andelot Professor at Harvard T.H. Chan School of Public Health
- George Hills, Anglican bishop
- Edmund Hobhouse, Anglican bishop
- Henry Holland, 1st Viscount Knutsford
- George Frederick Holmes
- Robert Hornby
- James Horstead
- Walsham How
- Tessa Howard, field hockey player
- Jules Hudson, archaeologist
- Malcolm K. Hughes, climatologist
- Simon Hughes, cricketer and journalist nicknamed The Analyst
- Henry Hyde, priest
- Kumar Iyer, Director General for Economics, Science and Technology at the Foreign, Commonwealth and Development Office
- David Jennings, composer
- John Jones, Anglican priest; Archdeacon of St Asaph
- Thomas Kerr, engineer; Director of the Royal Aircraft Establishment
- Christopher Kitching, archivist
- Gerald Knox, cricketer
- Christopher Lamb, journalist
- Timothy Laurence
- Craig Lawrence, former British Army officer, author and lecturer
- John Lawton, ecologist
- Edward Leigh, Conservative MP
- Andy Lines, Anglican bishop
- Peter Liss, environmental scientist
- Evered Lunt, Anglican bishop
- William Herrick Macaulay, mathematician and Vice-Povost of King's College, Cambridge
- Angus MacFarlane-Grieve
- Baret Magarian, writer
- Jane Marriott
- Guy Marshall, Anglican bishop
- Richard Massey, physicist
- Rachel McCarthy
- David Mercer, playwright
- Richard Mercer, cricketer
- Piers Merchant
- Huw Merriman
- Ed Mitchell, presenter for ITN
- James Montgomery, Anglican priest
- David Moore, botanist
- James Morris, cricketer
- Rory Morrison, BBC Radio 4 newsreader
- Peter Ogden, founder of Computacenter
- George Ornsby, antiquarian
- Denis Osborne, physicist and diplomat
- Chris Oti, England rugby player
- James Palmes, Archdeacon of the East Riding (1892–1898)
- Frank Pasquill, meteorologist
- Robin Pedley, educationist
- Octavius Pickard-Cambridge, clergyman and arachnologist
- Maurice Berkeley Portman
- Arthur Prowse, physicist and academic administrator; founding Master of Van Mildert College
- James Raine, antiquarian and Chancellor of York Minster
- Sir Thomas Richardson-Bunbury, 6th Baronet
- Andrew Ritchie, British Army officer; Commandant of the Royal Military Academy, Sandhurst (2003–2006)
- Dan Rivers, correspondent at ITV News
- Charles Robertson, priest
- Jonathan Rougier, Professor of Statistical Science at the University of Bristol
- David Sadler, Professor of Human Geography
- Brian Scarlett, particle technologist
- Caleb Scharf, physicist
- Robert Senior, advertising executive
- John Sewel, Baron Sewel, member of the House of Lords
- Graeme Shimmin, science fiction novelist
- Edward Shortt, lawyer and politician; Home Secretary (1919–1922)
- Gareth Sibson, writer and broadcaster
- Bertram Simpson, Bishop of Kensington (1932–1942)
- Sir John Sinclair, 3rd Baronet, landowner and politician
- Ian Smail, physicist
- Peter Snowdon, historian and journalist
- Martin St Quinton, horse racing entrepreneur
- Howard Stableford, television and radio presenter
- Ben Starr, actor
- Philip Steele, author of children's non-fiction
- Joseph Stevenson, antiquarian
- Jhathavedh Subramanyan, Hong Kong cricketer
- Paul Sutcliffe, Professor of Theoretical Physics at Durham
- Michael Tavinor, Dean of Hereford (2002–2021)
- Patriarch Theophilos III of Jerusalem (MA, 1984), Patriarch of the Orthodox Church of Jerusalem
- Thomas Charles Thompson, Liberal Party politician
- Maurice Tucker, Professor of Geology and Master of University College, Durham (1998–2011)
- Mike Tuffrey, Liberal Democrat politician
- Garry Tunnicliffe, Royal Air Force officer; Defence Services Secretary (2016–2019)
- James Turner, Bishop of Grafton and Armidale (1869–1893)
- Lily van den Broecke, British Paralympic rower
- Annabel Venning, journalist and author; Following the Drum: The Lives of Army Wives and Daughters Past and Present (2005)
- Fitzpatrick Vernon, 2nd Baron Lyveden, British peer and Liberal Party politician
- Henry Villiers-Stuart, Egyptologist and Liberal Party politician
- Terence Wade, Professor of Russian Studies at the University of Strathclyde (1987–1995)
- Stephen Warner, evangelical preacher
- Kevin Watkins, Chief Executive of Save the Children UK (2016–2021)
- Peter Watson, journalist and author
- L. P. Wenham, archaeologist
- James Wharton, Baron Wharton of Yarm, Conservative Party politician
- Thomas Wilkinson, Bishop of Hexham and Newcastle (1889–1909)
- Jonathan Wilks, diplomat
- Jim Williams (BA, Law and Sociology), author
- Hugh Willmott, archaeologist
- Thomas Woodcock, Garter Principal King of Arms (2010–2021)
- Adolphus Frederick Alexander Woodford (BA, 1846), soldier, writer and clergyman
