= Initial Police Learning and Development Programme =

Initial Police Learning and Development Programme (IPLDP) is the curriculum for the initial training of police officers within England and Wales.

== Background ==
Prior to 1 April 2002, initial police training for new police officers was the responsibility of the Home Office - namely National Police Training and from this date onward, training of new police officers was absorbed by the Central Police Training and Development Authority known as CENTREX. Following the introduction of the Police and Justice Bill, the National Policing Improvement Agency (NPIA) was formed and this replaced CENTREX and Police Information Technology Organisation (PITO) and assumed responsibility for the training of police officers.

== Probationer Training Programme ==
Prior to 26 May 2006, the curriculum for the training of new police officers was operated by CENTREX and was known as the Probationer Training Programme. Initial police training was delivered at Police Training Centres (PTCs) at the following locations:

- Ashford
- Bruche
- Cwmbran
- Durham
- Ryton-on-Dunsmore
- Bramshill

With the conclusion of the PTP and the progression to IPLDP, Ashford, Bruche and Cwmbran were closed. Ryton was re-designated as a NPIA site and Durham (at Durham Constabulary's headquarters at Aykley Heads) became the North East Centre for Policing Skills (NECPS) where both Northumbria Police and Durham Constabulary would jointly deliver IPLDP to their new police recruits.

== Qualifications ==
Successful completion of the IPLDP will result in the police officer being awarded a Diploma in Policing (from January 2010 onwards). This is a Level 3 qualification within the Qualifications and Credit Framework (QCF) which replaced the older Level 3 and 4 National Vocational Qualification on the National Qualifications Framework (NQF).

The qualification consists of ten mandatory units:

- Provide Initial Support to Victims and Witnesses
- Gather and Submit Information to Support Law Enforcement Objectives
- Provide an Initial Response to Incidents
- Arrest, Detain or Report Individuals
- Conduct Priority and Volume Investigations
- Interview Victims and Witnesses in Relation to Priority and Volume Investigations
- Interview Suspects in Relation to Priority and Volume Investigations
- Searching People in a Policing Context
- Search Vehicles, Premises and Open Spaces
- Manage Conflict in a Policing Context

Some forces such as West Yorkshire Police entered partnerships with local universities to offer their new police officers foundation degrees instead of NVQs however this has now ceased and all forces now offer the Diploma in Policing.

== Structure ==
The IPLDP contains four general phases and although may be named slightly differently from force to force will follow roughly the following structure:

- Phase 1: Induction - general introduction to the organisation with training in first aid, health and safety, officer safety, ICT, race and diversity, human rights and community safety strategy.
- Phase 2: Community - training in crime and disorder reduction and a community placement.
- Phase 3: Supervised patrol - workplace practice supported by class-based learning, dealing with simulated incidents and work-based learning under supervised patrol.
- Phase 4: Independent patrol - combines operational duties with independent and distance learning.

Throughout all phases are formative and summative assessments and whilst in Phase 3 (supervised patrol with a tutor constable) certain tasks need to be successfully completed known as the Police Action Checklists (PACs). Once PACs are completed and signed off and once in the independent patrol phase, a portfolio of evidence is required of assessment reports and witness testimonies mapped against the National Occupational Standards (NOSs). All evidence, assessment reports and witness testimonies are recorded in a personal issue Student Officer Learning and Assessment Portfolio otherwise known as SOLAP.
