= National Police Library =

Coordinates: 52.3549°N 1.4414°W

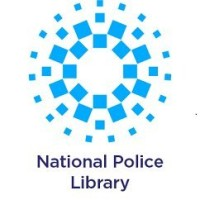
- Location: College of Policing, Leamington Road, Ryton-on-Dunsmore, CV8 3EN, United Kingdom
- Type: Library
- Established: 1948

Collection
- Items collected: books, journals, magazines, archives, theses, grey literature and pamphlets
- Size: 60,000 books and pamphlets; 3,500 periodical titles

Access and use
- Access requirements: Free access to UK police and police staff

Other information
- Website: National Police Library

The National Police Library, in the United Kingdom, is a special and research library. It is part of the College of Policing, funded by the Home Office, and is Europe's largest policing library. It is only accessible to current serving police and police staff in the United Kingdom.

Services include access to online resources, electronic books and periodicals; postal book loans; reference enquiries and document delivery service; and advanced search skills training.

The printed collections at the library contain over 60,000 books, journals (printed and online), theses, pamphlets, reports collected from government and police forces, and unpublished grey literature. The collection also holds issues of the Police Review since 1893, and the Police Gazette since 1948.

Subject coverage includes police and policing, crime and crime prevention, criminology, criminal justice, forensic science, leadership, general management, training, educational theory, social science and psychology.

== History ==
The library was established as part of the National Police College in Ryton-on-Dunsmore in June 1948, originally created to serve senior ranks. This followed the recommendation in the Dixon Report (1930): "the object of which should be to develop so far as possible each officer’s capacity for individual application to the problems of his profession and his fitness for higher responsibility." In 1945, The Police Journal: A Review for the Police Forces of the Empire also suggested the need for a National Police Library.

The library was renamed Police Staff College Library and relocated to the Police Staff College, Bramshill in 1960. The library was situated in the Long Gallery on the first floor of Bramshill House. In 1998, the library was renamed National Police Library to reflect the change in outlook; widening access to services to police officers and police staff across all forces across the UK.

The library later become part of the National Policing Improvement Agency and in 2013, it transferred to the newly established College of Policing. Following the sale of the Bramshill House in 2014, the National Police Library temporarily relocated to the College's Sunningdale Park site in March 2015. The library moved permanently to the College of Policing's headquarters in Ryton-On-Dunsmore in February 2017.
