= Andy Marsh =

British police officer

Sir Andy Marsh QPM
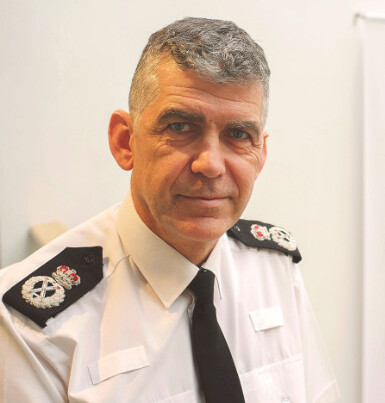
- Marsh in 2021

His Majesty's Chief Inspector of Constabulary and Fire & Rescue Services
- Incumbent
- Assumed office 1 October 2026
- Preceded by: Michelle Skeer (acting)

Chief Executive Officer of College of Policing
- In office September 2021 – September 2026
- Preceded by: Mike Cunningham

Chief Constable of Avon and Somerset Police
- In office February 2016 – 1 July 2021
- Deputy: Sarah Crew
- Preceded by: Gareth Morgan
- Succeeded by: Sarah Crew

Chief Constable of Hampshire Constabulary
- In office 2013–2016
- Preceded by: Alex Marshall
- Succeeded by: Olivia Pinkney

Personal details
- Born: Andrew David Marsh; 20 March 1966 (age 60) Liverpool, England
- Citizenship: United Kingdom
- Awards: Knight Bachelor (2024); Queen's Police Medal (2018)

Sir Andrew David Marsh (born 1966) is a British former police officer. He was the Chief Executive Officer of the College of Policing from 2021 to 2026, and has been His Majesty's Chief Inspector of Constabulary and Chief Inspector of Fire & Rescue Services since October 2026.

== Biography ==
Marsh was born on 20 March 1966 in Liverpool, England.

His policing career commenced as a recruit at Avon and Somerset in 1987. He later became assistant chief constable (ACC) for Wiltshire Police, then ACC for Avon and Somerset, then chief constable of Hampshire Constabulary. From February 2016 to July 2021, he was chief constable of Avon and Somerset Police.

Marsh was chief executive of the College of Policing from September 2021 until September 2026. He was knighted in the 2024 King's Birthday Honours "for services to policing".

On 7 July 2026, it was announced that Marsh was the British Government's preferred candidate for His Majesty's Inspectorate of Constabulary and Fire & Rescue Services (HMICFRS). He formally took up office as His Majesty's Chief Inspector of Constabulary and Chief Inspector of Fire & Rescue Services in October 2026.

== Honours ==

Ribbon	Description	Notes
	Knight Bachelor	2024 King's Birthday Honours
	Queen's Police Medal (QPM)	2017 New Year Honours
	Queen Elizabeth II Golden Jubilee Medal	2002; UK version of this medal
	Queen Elizabeth II Diamond Jubilee Medal	2012; UK version of this medal
	Queen Elizabeth II Platinum Jubilee Medal	2022; UK version of this medal
	King Charles III Coronation Medal	2023; UK version of this medal
	Police Long Service and Good Conduct Medal	

Police appointments
Preceded by Alex Marshall	Chief Constable of Hampshire Constabulary; 2013–2016	Succeeded by Olivia Pinkney
Preceded by Gareth Morgan	Chief Constable of Avon and Somerset Police; 2016–2021	Succeeded by Sarah Crew
Preceded by Mike Cunningham	Chief Executive of the College of Policing; 2021–2026	Succeeded by Jo Noakes (interim)
