= Rob Beckley =

Rob Beckley may refer to:

- Rob Beckley (musician), American Christian rock musician
- Rob Beckley (police officer), British police officer
