= The Secret Policeman =

BBC documentary

The Secret Policeman is a documentary about an undercover reporter that reveals racism among police recruits in Manchester, England. It was screened by the BBC in October 2003. It was filmed by Mark Daly, an investigative journalist, who joined the Greater Manchester Police Service and spent several months undercover at the Bruche National Training Centre in Warrington, Cheshire. He filmed episodes of racist behaviour among some recruits and their trainers.

== Bruche National Training Centre ==
Bruche National Training Centre, Warrington, Cheshire, was operational between 1946 and May 2006. The facility provided initial training to new police officers.

== Police training ==
In 2002, a "Training Matters Report" by Her Majesty's Inspector of Constabulary (HMI) indicated that police training was not fit for purpose. The principal concern of the report was that police officers were not given enough training regarding the policing of diverse communities. The report was influenced by the findings of the "Macpherson Report". The training of police officers had already begun a restructuring process prior to the broadcast of The Secret Policeman. The documentary sparked further restructuring which led to the Initial Police Learning and Development Programme (IPLDP), which was implemented by the Home Office in April 2005.

== Macpherson Report ==
The initial scope of the Macpherson inquiry was the murder of Stephen Lawrence in 1993. However, it later expanded into a broader examination of racism within the police service, defining the term "institutional racism" as "the collective failure of an organization to provide an appropriate and professional service to people because of their colour, culture or ethnic origin. It can be seen or detected in processes, attitudes and behaviour which amount to discrimination through unwitting prejudice, ignorance, thoughtlessness and racist stereotyping which disadvantage minority ethnic people".

== The documentary ==
On 27 January 2003, Mark Daly, an undercover journalist, joined the Greater Manchester Police Service (GMP) to investigate racism within the police service. In the previous year, the Chief Constable had said that his police force was "institutionally racist". Most of the filming was completed during fifteen weeks of training at Bruche and it exposed racism among some of the police officers. PC Rob Pulling from North Wales Police was captured on film stating that Stephen Lawrence "deserved it", his parents were "spongers" and that the murders granted "diplomatic immunity". He further stated that he would, "bury an Asian under the train track". Additionally, he wore a pillowcase over his head and pretended to be a member of the Ku Klux Klan. Furthermore, he admitted to engaging in an unprovoked attack on an Asian man. In addition to PC Pulling, the other police officers exposed during the filming were PC Keith Cheshire, North Wales Police, PC Andy Hall, PC Carl Jones, PC Tony Lewin, PC Adrian Harrison, PC Andy Turley, GMP, and PC Steve Salkeld, Cheshire Police. On 21 October 2003, the documentary was broadcast and made national headlines. David Blunkett, the Home Secretary, and various senior police officers condemned the racist behaviour of the police officers exposed as a result of the documentary. However, there were criticisms about the use of undercover journalism to study the topic.

== Resignations ==
After the broadcast, ten police officers resigned, twelve police officers were disciplined and three police trainers were removed from their positions.

== Arrest of Mark Daly ==
Mark Daly continued as a police officer after his training at Bruche, and worked at the Hazel Grove Police Station in Stockport. In August 2003, GMP received an anonymous tip-off about the documentary and he was arrested on his way to work. The GMP accused him of "obtaining a pecuniary advantage by deception" because he had claimed a police-constable salary whilst working undercover. The Crown Prosecution Service found that there was insufficient evidence to proceed with the prosecution.
