= HOLMES 2 =

Database of the United Kingdom government for major crimes

HOLMES 2 (Home Office Large Major Enquiry System) is an information technology system that is predominantly used by UK police forces for the investigation of major incidents such as serial murders and high-value frauds.

The system is a single application which was developed by Unisys and McDonnell Douglas Information Systems (in competition, not co-operation) for the Police Information Technology Organisation under a private finance initiative. It provides total compatibility and consistency between all the police forces of England, Scotland, Wales, and Northern Ireland, as well as the Royal Military Police. The name of the system is a reference to the fictional Arthur Conan Doyle private detective character Sherlock Holmes.

== History of development ==
=== HOLMES ===
HOLMES was introduced in 1985 and enabled law enforcement agencies to improve effectiveness and productivity in crime investigations. Like the later HOLMES 2, it was an administrative support system that was primarily designed to assist senior investigation officers in their management of the complexity of investigating serious crime.

HOLMES was also used to support the Police UK Casualty Bureau providing facilities to record reported missing persons, casualties, survivors and evacuees. The application provides matching facilities to aid the reconciliation of missing persons with those involved in the incident.

The system had crucial weaknesses, too. It provided very little support to the investigation of the crime in itself and had only very limited opportunities to link separate incidents, especially across police force boundaries. A solution was needed that allowed an increased amount of information exchange combined with better use of the information.

In the summer of 1987 HOLMES was used in conjunction with a West Midlands Police undercover operation known as Operation GROWTH as an aid for undercover police officers who had infiltrated a notorious gang of football hooligans known as The Bridge Boys who followed Wolverhampton Wanderers. Previous trials of football hooligans had collapsed due to the way undercover police gathered evidence while on the job. Any evidence gathered during GROWTH was collated straight to HOLMES which in turn secured successful convictions in December 1988.

== Replacement ==
The British police forces started a plan to replace the system with an improved version in 1994. The new version, HOLMES 2, overcame the known weaknesses of HOLMES. It is more flexible for future changes and provides a speedier and more efficient access to information. The system was finally released to the first forces in 2000, while the last forces became operational in early 2004.

== Applications ==
HOLMES 2's most important function is as a crime investigation tool. For this purpose, it is based on an organised and methodical approach, whose structure concentrates on the major incident room (MIR). This is the administrative centre where further investigation actions are coordinated and all the information from members of the public, enquiry officers and other sources is gathered. With the help of input masks, HOLMES 2 is provided with the relevant information and used by the senior investigating officer to direct and control the course of the enquiry. In this respect, the system uses a combination of commercial off-the-shelf components and purpose-built software to provide the most cost-effective system for the police service. Furthermore, the improved HOLMES embeds computer intelligence for the first time. The dynamic reasoning engine (DRE), for example, makes it possible to combine the skills and experiences of crime investigators with the acquired knowledge of the system in order to identify new lines of enquiry.

Another important use of HOLMES 2 lies in disaster management. The reason for this can be seen in the similarities that exist between the investigation of a major incident and a major disaster. In case of a disaster, HOLMES 2 collaborates with the facilities for disaster management via the casualty bureau. The additional functions required for casualty bureau operations, like recording Interpol data and specific action management facilities, are fully integrated into the HOLMES 2. HOLMES 2 also provides the ability to pool resources in order to handle more effectively the initial peak load of missing person calls from the public.

There is also a fully-mobile version of HOLMES 2 which can be run on a laptop for use in courts or while travelling.

== Technical details ==
The client/server architecture of HOLMES 2 is based on Microsoft Windows 2000 Professional or NT 4.0 workstations with UNIX servers running either Solaris or UnixWare. The system network communicates by using TCP/IP network protocols for LAN and WLAN communication.

Furthermore, HOLMES 2 uses a two-tier approach for local database access and a three-tier approach for remote database access, whereby remote database access is user-configurable from the front end. A free-text database allows users to ask unstructured questions and to present the results in order of relevance. Apart from that, a dual operation was adopted to increase the speed of the system. While searches themselves were tuned at the SQL (Structured Query Language) level, additional indexes on the RDBMS (relational database management system) tables were deployed.

== See also ==
- Home Office
- Geographic information system
- Crime mapping
- Artificial intelligence
