= Police Staff College, Bramshill =

Former police staff training establishment in England

Coordinates: 51°19′56″N 0°54′43″W

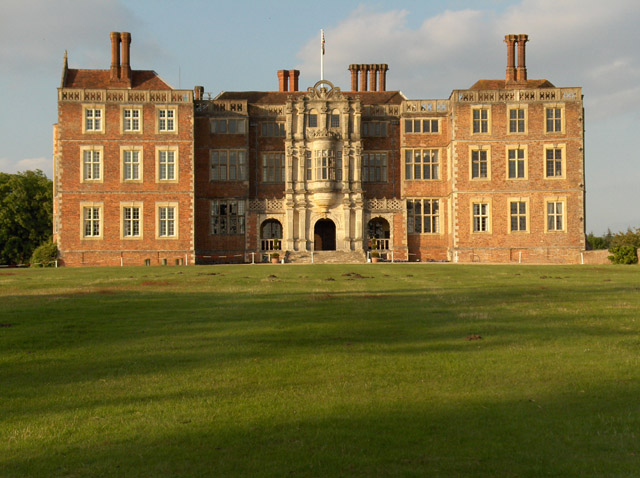
Bramshill House – Police Staff College

The Police Staff College, Bramshill, Bramshill House, Bramshill, (near Hook) Hampshire, England, was until 2015 the principal police staff training establishment in England and Wales.

== History ==
The need for a training college for the police was pushed heavily by Sir Frank Newsam, who was the second most senior Home Office civil servant in the immediate post-war years. Sir Harold Scott, Commissioner of the Metropolitan Police in the late 1940s, also called for the establishment for such a college and it was established in June 1948 as the National Police College (taking its present name in 1979). The National Police Library was also established in 1948 and is still in existence, located in Ryton-on-Dunsmore.

From 1948 to 1960, it was located at Ryton-on-Dunsmore, Warwickshire, but when Newsam became Permanent Secretary of the Home Office he secured for it a permanent base in Bramshill to which it moved in 1960. The main building at Bramshill is a Grade I listed Jacobean mansion.

Bramshill was part of Centrex, the Central Police Training and Development Authority, established under Part 4 of the Criminal Justice and Police Act 2001.

Between 2004 and 2014, Bramshill hosted the European Union Police College (CEPOL).

On 1 April 2007, Bramshill became part of the National Policing Improvement Agency, which replaced Centrex. The NPIA supported the police service by providing expertise in areas such as serious crime analysis, training, operational support and in the development of new policing technologies and skills.

In November 2012, the professional body for policing was created, called the College of Policing. Meanwhile, the historic main building at Bramshill proved very expensive to maintain and it was decided to sell the Bramshill site. The college closed the site in March 2015, and it has had planning applications to be redeveloped as housing development with 350 homes. To date (June 2020) these plans have been refused.

== Governance ==
The Staff College was headed by a Board of Governors, half appointed by the Home Secretary and half by local authorities. Sir Frank Newsam was the founder chair of the board. The academic and administrative head of the college was the Commandant. There was also a Deputy Commandant, who was of the rank of Assistant Chief Constable or Commander, and an Assistant Commandant. Junior, Intermediate, and Senior Command Courses were run for Inspectors/Chief Inspectors, Superintendents and Chief Superintendents, respectively. There was also the Special Course for sergeants.

== Notable alumni ==
- Adel al-Fadhel – soldier and politician

== See also ==
- Tulliallan Castle – Scottish Police College
