= IDENT1 =

Biometric information database used in the United Kingdom

IDENT1 is the United Kingdom's central national database for holding, searching and comparing biometric information on those who come into contact with the police as detainees after being arrested. Information held includes fingerprints, palm prints and scene of crime marks.

It replaced the old system known as the National Automated Fingerprint Identification System (NAFIS), and works in partnership with Livescan technology.

According to the National Policing Improvement Agency, IDENT1 currently contains the fingerprints of 7.1 million people and makes 85,000 matches with data recovered from crime scenes per year. Verified over 1.5 Million arrestee identifications per year. Checks more than 2,000 identities from Lantern mobile devices per month. Checks 40,000 identities per week for UK Visas and Immigration.

IDENT1 was developed by US defence company Northrop Grumman, who were awarded the £122m contract in December 2004. The deal was expected to last for eight years, with an additional three "option" years.

== See also ==
- United Kingdom National DNA Database
