= Police Gazette (United Kingdom) =

British police newspaper (1772–2017)

The Police Gazette; or, Hue and Cry
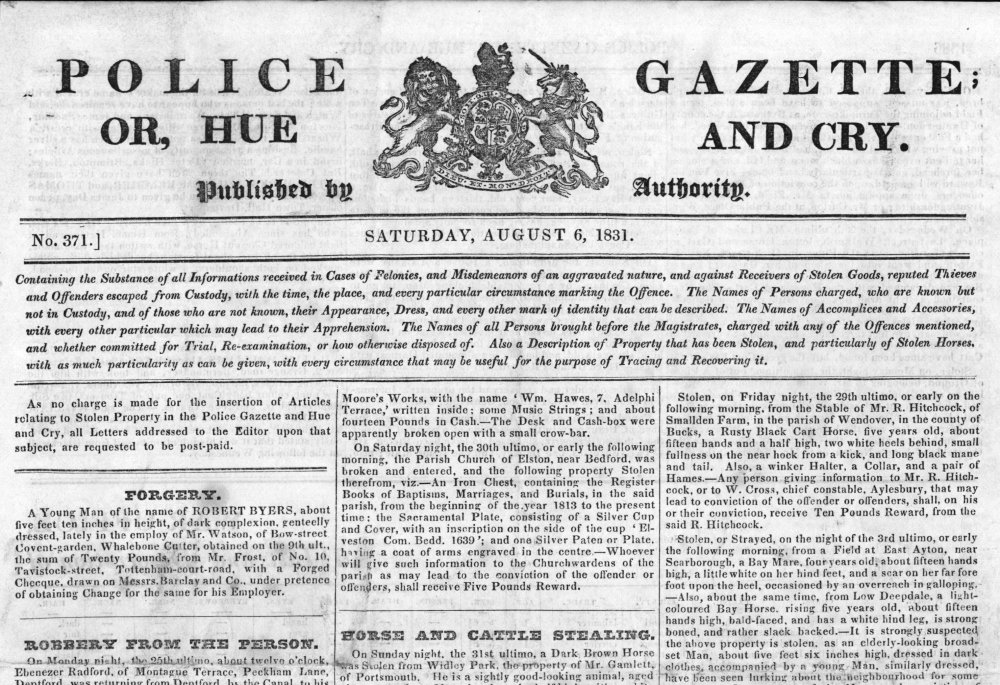
- The front page of Police Gazette or Hue and Cry 6 August 1831
- Type: Newspaper
- Owner(s): College of Policing; Home Office
- Founded: 1772
- Ceased publication: 2017
- Headquarters: London

The Police Gazette, established in 1772 as The Quarterly Pursuit, and later named the Public Hue and Cry and other variants, was originally a weekly newspaper produced until 1883 by the Home Office and from then until 2017 by the Metropolitan Police. (Note: Another newspaper of the same name is said to have been published in Dublin by Dublin Castle, the Dublin Metropolitan Police and the Royal Irish Constabulary. The newspaper, possibly with variants, was circulated to other British territories including Australia.) Its primary purpose was to publish notices of wanted criminals with requests for information, and where appropriate to offer rewards. In later years it became a bi-monthly publication produced by the College of Policing in London until it ceased publication in 2017.

== Title ==
Initially titled The Quarterly Pursuit, the publication was repeatedly renamed, first to Public Hue and Cry. It became The Hue and Cry, and Police Gazette on 30 September 1797. It was renamed to Police Gazette; or, Hue and Cry on 18 January 1828. It became simply The Police Gazette on 1 April 1839.

The title Hue and Cry alludes to the historical common law process, dating back to the 13th century, whereby bystanders were summoned to assist in the apprehension of criminals.

== History ==
The Quarterly Pursuit was first issued by John Fielding, chief magistrate of the Bow Street Police Court, in 1772. It was distributed free until 1793, when the following announcement was made:

Hue and Cry, and Police Gazette, Has for many Years been sent, gratis, by the Chief Magistrate in Bow-Street, to the Principal Acting Justices of the Peace and other Persons connected with the Administration of Criminal Justice in different parts of England. It has been thought that this Paper would conduce more to the Design of its first Institution, if it was made more generally Public; which cannot be done, without exposing it to Sale, like the London Gazette and other Newspapers, it has accordingly been determined, that in future it shall be sold by the Hawkers and other Newscarriers in Town and Country, at the usual Price of other Newspapers. The Hue and Cry is at present published Every Other Saturday.

Responsibility for its original production rested with the Home Office. Editing was delegated to the Chief Clerk to Bow Street Magistrates' Court, notably John Alexander, who edited the Gazette from 1877 until 1895. Responsibility for the Police Gazette was transferred to the Metropolitan Police ("Scotland Yard") in 1883.

In more recent years, responsibility for publication transferred to the National Police Improvement Agency (NPIA), and then eventually to the College of Policing.

=== Stated purpose ===
The purpose of the publication was stated on the front page in 1831 as follows:

Containing the Substance of all Informations received in Cases of Felonies, and Misdemeanors of an aggravated nature, and against Receivers of Stolen Goods, reputed Thieves and Offenders escaped from Custody, with the time, the place, and every particular circumstance marking the Offence. The Names of Persons charged, who are known but not in Custody, and of those who are not known, their Appearance, Dress, and every other mark of identity that can be described. The Names of Accomplices and Accessories, with every other particular that may lead to their Apprehension. The Names of all Persons brought before the Magistrates, charged with any of the Offences mentioned, and whether committed for Trial, Re-examination, or how otherwise disposed of. Also a Description of Property that has been Stolen, and particularly of Stolen Horses, with as much particularity as can be given, with every circumstance that may be useful for the purpose of Tracing and Recovering it.

=== Structure ===
Historically, The Police Gazette was published as follows:

Section	Frequency	Content
Main Magazine	Weekly	crimes committed, information wanted
Supplement A	Fortnightly	details of active travelling criminals.
Supplement B	Weekly	particulars of convicts on licence, persons under police supervision and other wanted people.
Supplement C	Fortnightly?	wanted aliens.
Supplement D	Fortnightly, (alternating with Supplement A)	absentees and deserters from HM Forces.
Supplement E	?	photographs of active criminals.
Supplement F	-	not issued?
Supplement G	Daily	deaths of people who had previously appeared in the Police Gazette.

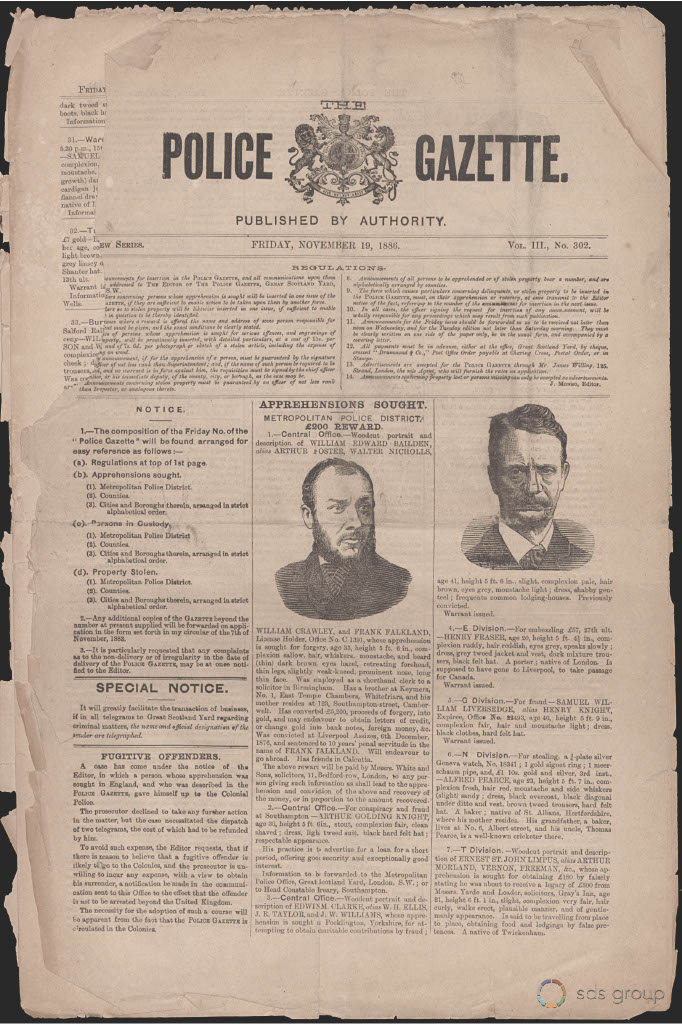
Police Gazette from 19 November 1886.

=== Circulation ===
The Police Gazette was circulated throughout the British Isles. Since an archive survives in New South Wales, Australia, the Police Gazette may also have been circulated in countries governed by Britain around the world. However, local gazettes were printed by states in Australia (e.g., the Victoria Police Gazette, which began in 1853).

=== Historical value ===
The Police Gazette recorded the history of crime; the role of the police; and major social events such as the penal transportation of criminals to Australia. The many references to personal names – of missing persons, criminals, army deserters and those deported and imprisoned – make it an important source for genealogy when census and marriage records prove insufficient.

== Cultural references ==
- In Charles Dickens' Oliver Twist (1837–39), chapter 15, the criminal Fagin is depicted "absorbed in the interesting pages of the Hue-and-Cry".

== Surviving archives ==
At least 61% of the total run of issues from 1772 to 1900 survives, archived by the initiative of local police forces, as well as by the British Library.

Many of the Supplements between 1914 and 1965 also survive.
