= Live scan =

Law enforcement technique

Live scan fingerprinting refers to both the technique and the technology used by law enforcement agencies and private facilities to capture fingerprints and palm prints electronically, without the need for the more traditional method of ink and paper.

In the United States, most law enforcement agencies use live scan as their primary tool in the recognition of human individuals. Live scan is commonly used for criminal booking, sexual offender registration, civil applicant and background check.

In the UK, many major police custody suites are now equipped with Live Scan machines, which allow for suspects' fingerprints to be instantly compared with a national database, IDENT1, with results usually reported in less than ten minutes.

Live scan package includes a PC workstation (desktop or laptop), a fingerprint capture device, a digital camera and a signature pad. The product and technology have been around for over twenty years.

== Applications ==
=== Level 2 background check ===
Level 2 background checks are a fingerprint-based criminal background check which includes in-depth investigation of an individual’s criminal history, credit report and other relevant public records, processed by the FBI's National Crime Information Center (NCIC). In the vast majority of cases, level 2 background checks are required for contract personnel who are permitted access on school grounds when students are present, or if they will have direct contact with students or have access to or control of school funds. By law, only certified law enforcement personnel can fulfill the fingerprinting process, as they must attach their police ID number to the fingerprint card. Oftentimes, school districts have their own set of requirements implemented into each contractor's RFP bids. They may require additional criminal background checks from local police departments where a subject has resided in their past.

=== Out-of-State Live Scan ===
As a result of many different procedures and processes for each state, Live Scan previously had to be completed in person because states do not communicate with other states. In 2013, many states started allowing applicants to submit FD-258 fingerprinting cards to registered live scan providers because the cost was found to be astronomically high, especially for travelling medical professionals who are required by law to be registered in each state they work in.
