= Richmond Park Academy =

School in Richmond upon Thames, London, England

Lift Richmond Park
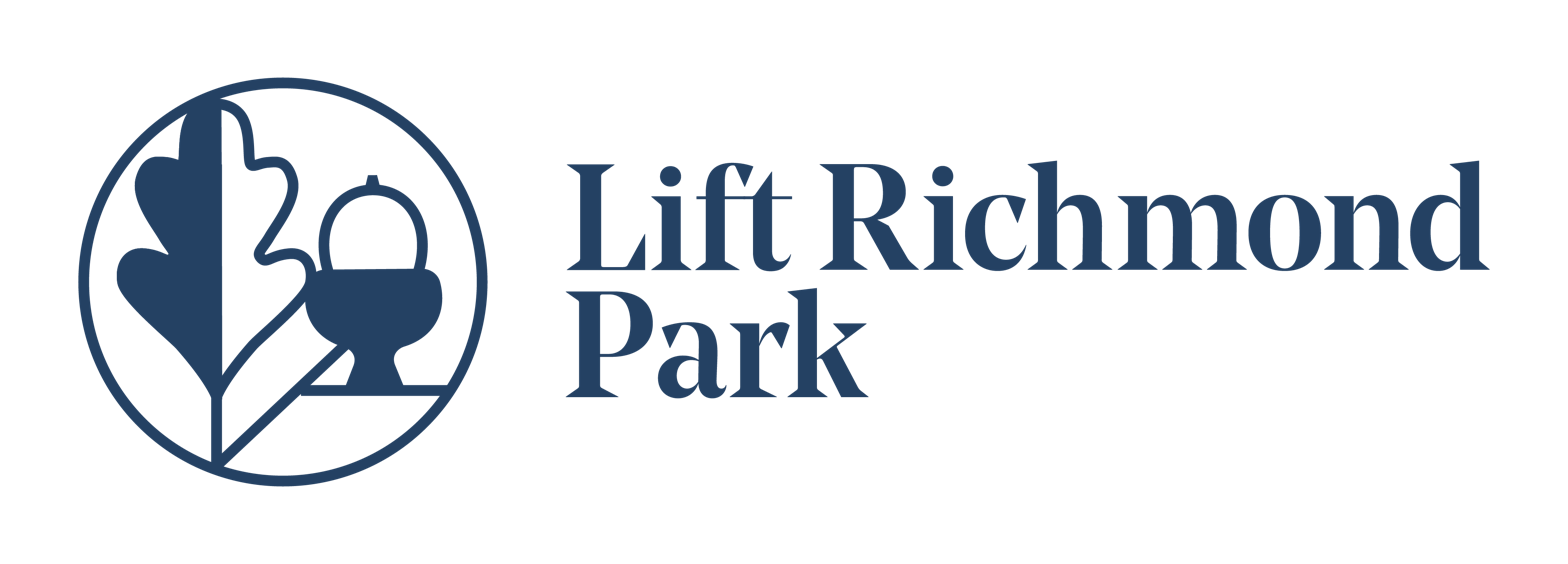

Location
- SW14 8RG; England; 51°27′45″N 0°15′34″W

Information
- Type: Academy
- Motto: Excellence is a Habit
- Established: 1895; Refounded as an academy in 2010
- Local authority: Richmond upon Thames
- Trust: Lift Schools
- Department for Education URN: 136208 Tables
- Ofsted: Reports
- Head of School: James Whelan
- Gender: Mixed
- Age: 11 to 18
- Enrolment: 1,039
- Website: https://www.liftrichmondpark.org/

Lift Richmond Park is a secondary school with an academy status in the London Borough of Richmond upon Thames. The school is part of the Lift Schools.

Richmond Park Academy was formed in 2010 when academy status was granted to the predecessor Shene School. In 2024, Richmond Park Academy renamed as Lift Richmond Park. The academy is led by James Whelan, and is managed by Lift Schools. In 2011 the academy secured almost £10 million of government funding for building improvements. Renovation and new building work was finished in 2015, with an official opening by Dame Jacqueline Wilson.

== Performance ==
As with other schools, latest exam results and related data are published in the Department for Education's national tables.

== History ==
Richmond Park Academy is the most recent in a succession of schools that have occupied the location on Park Avenue and Hertford Avenue, East Sheen.

=== Richmond County School ===
Richmond County School for Boys
- Richmond, Greater London; England

Information
- Established: 2 July 1895
- Closed: 1939 (amalgamated with East Sheen County Grammar School)
- Gender: mixed
- Age: 11 to 16
- coordinates: 51.4666°N 0.2969°W

In the latter part of the 19th century there was no reasonable secondary education in Barnes and Richmond for miles around except for those who could afford private tuition or send their children many miles to school. In the most populous areas of Surrey, (e.g. Sutton, Wimbledon and Richmond) parents were for the most part obliged to be content to give their children an Elementary education. Richmond County was to be one of a series of new technical buildings erected or being erected by the County Council in the seven principal towns of the county. The school was opened on 2 July 1895 on land in Kew Road, Richmond and was fee paying. The buildings occupied a prominent site on the Kew Road at the corner of Selwyn Avenue. This building housed both the Technical Institute and secondary school. Pupils residing in Surrey paid £6 per year, whilst those from outside the county paid £10. The school began with a headmaster and five assistant masters, with visiting staff for the teaching of Art, Singing, French and German. Originally there were 50 boys between 11 and 16 and by 1901, when the new south wing was added, numbers had increased. An extension comprising an assembly hall, four classrooms a gymnasium/drill hall and two workshops was opened in 1902. The first headmaster, A E Buckhurst, was succeeded in 1912 by T W Beasley who continued in office until the school's amalgamation with East Sheen County School for Boys in 1939. When the school merged with East Sheen County School for Boys in 1939 the school moved out of the Kew Road premises leaving the Technical Institute as sole occupants of the Kew Road site. The Technical Institute continued up to the Second World War when it was put on a war-time basis and used as an A.R.P and ambulance depot. It was revived as the Technical Institute and School of Art for Richmond and Barnes in 1947 and in 1954 renamed as the Richmond Institute of Further Education. In 1970 it became the Richmond Adult College and in 1978 transferred to the Parkshot site, vacant with the closure of Richmond County School for Girls and as the Parkshot campus of Richmond and Hillcroft Adult Community College remains at that site.

=== East Sheen County School for Boys ===
House	Colours
Fife	Yellow
Hood	Red
Temple	Green
York	Blue

East Sheen County School for Boys opened on 18 January 1927 on Hertford Avenue. The first headmaster was Mr H H Shephard, then aged 33. Ninety pupils gained entry via the Common Entrance Examination and fifteen boys were transferred from Richmond County Boys School. Provision was made for 20 county scholarship places and by 1928 the intake had risen to 210 boys.

==== Houses ====
Shepherd established use of the house system. All boys were members of one of four houses, each house name derived from the names of local roads. The houses remained in use until the closure of the school in the 1970s.

=== East Sheen County School for Girls ===
In 1930 an area of the Hertford Avenue site was fenced off to build the girls' school which opened in 1931.

=== Richmond and East Sheen County School for Boys ===
A review of education in the county commencing in 1937 concluded that local population numbers were relatively stable so there were significant economies to be made by reducing the number of county schools in the borough from four to two. In addition the Kew Road site was inadequate in size, and pupil numbers in the county schools were declining due to increased school building in neighbouring boroughs and the effect of the Great Depression. In 1939, despite local opposition, the boys from Richmond County School were merged with East Sheen County School for Boys at the Sheen site, continuing under headmaster Mr Shepherd. In the same restructuring, East Sheen County School for Girls was merged with Richmond County School for Girls at the Parkshot site. Although the Richmond girls' school retained its name, the Sheen school was renamed Richmond and East Sheen County School for Boys.

Seniors were based in the original boys' school building nearer Park Avenue, whilst junior boys (age 10–13) occupied the former girls' school site which was also used for laboratory science and, for the first time, to provide school meals. The school also retained use of the former Richmond school playing fields at Pesthouse Common, (now the site of Christ's School).

Following the Education Act 1944 the School became known as Richmond and East Sheen County (Grammar) School for Boys.

=== Mortlake County Girls School ===
As Mortlake County Girls School lacked air-raid shelters, early during the Second World War, the school moved to the then partially empty girls' school buildings on the Hertford Avenue site. The school remained there as Hertford Avenue Girls School until the formation of the Sixth Form College.

==== G. P. Rawlings ====
In 1953 Mr H H Shephard retired after 25 years' service and assistant head, history teacher Mr Bacon, led the school for a brief period until the appointment of his successor, G P Rawlings.

Like his predecessors, Grahame Pryce Rawlings (1912 – 17 April 1993) was educated at Oxford where he gained his MA in mathematics and represented Hertford College at Rugby Union. During the Second World War he joined the RAFVR, became a Spitfire pilot, and rose to the rank of Wing Commander. At the end of the war he was awarded the OBE.

After the war Rawlings remained in the Air Force, transferring to a commission as Flight Lieutenant, Technical Branch, in 1948. Rawlings wrote several books; a training manual Electricity for Air Training published in 1941, and mathematics books covering Trigonometry, the Slide rule and calculus. Prior to joining the school he was Director of Studies at the naval training establishment HMS Worcester. He joined the school in the summer of 1954. Outside of school, Rawlings also became a JP.

=== Shene County Grammar School for Boys ===
Shene County Grammar School for Boys

Location
- Park Avenue; Richmond, Greater London, SW14; England

Information
- Type: Grammar
- Motto: Enrich the time to come
- Established: 1939 (1957 under this name)
- Closed: 1973
- Local authority: Richmond upon Thames
- Headmaster: G. P. Rawlings
- Gender: Boys
- Age: 11 to 18
- Houses: Fife, Hood, Temple, York

The Jubilee of Richmond County School was celebrated in 1956 and a fund launched towards the building of a new Library, completed in 1958. Also in 1956 Mr Rawlings established the school motto Enrich the Time to Come taken from the last scene of Shakespeare's Richard III.

In 1957, Richmond and East Sheen County Grammar School for Boys became known simply as Shene County Grammar School for Boys, using the Anglo-Saxon spelling of the name for Richmond previously adopted by the Old Boys' society. (Informally, the school was more commonly referred to simply as Shene Grammar).

During 1957 a new laboratory, prep room and two classrooms were added and the school electricity supply changed from DC to AC. In 1961 a new dining area and kitchen were built at the rear of the Main Hall and a new Gymnasium built to the west of the site in 1967.

During this period, the sports facilities at Barn Elms were used for rugby and cricket according to season, and use made of the county sailing and canoeing facilities at Ham.

=== Shene College ===
A major reorganisation of education and the end of selective education in the borough in the early 1970s caused the demise of the school. Shene Grammar took in its final intake of pupils in September 1972.

From 1973 the former grammar school sixth form was expanded and the school became Shene College, predominately a sixth form college but, due to the remaining grammar school pupils, not entirely so. Mr Rawlings left to become Mathematics Advisor for the borough. Mr Eric Healey was appointed as principal, with Mr R Friggens, former Deputy Head of the boys' school assisting administratively, Mrs K Kulisa, Headmistress of the Richmond County Girls taking charge of academic affairs and Mr R Smith (from outside the borough) leading on pupil matters. As part of the conversion of the school a new technical block was built to the east of the main hall.

With dwindling pupil numbers and some staff increasingly sharing roles across Richmond and Shene sites, the remaining pupils and staff of Richmond County School for Girls merged with the remainder of the boys' school at the Shene site in 1974.

In a further borough education reorganisation in 1977, with the final cohort of grammar school pupils reaching the sixth form, Shene College was merged with the borough's other sixth form college, Thames Valley, and the Technical College at Twickenham. Together they formed one large tertiary college, Richmond upon Thames College, on the Technical College site off the Great Chertsey Road. The Shene site became the Shene Comprehensive School.

=== Shene Comprehensive School and Shene School ===
Shene School

Location
- Park Avenue; East Sheen, Greater London, SW14 8RG; England

Information
- Type: Comprehensive
- Motto: Enrich the Time to Come
- Established: 1977
- Closed: 2010
- Local authority: Richmond Upon Thames
- Department for Education URN: 102927 Tables
- Ofsted: Reports
- Chair: Tina Jones
- Headteacher: Lesley Kirby
- Gender: Mixed
- Age: 11 to 16
- Enrolment: 815
- Houses: Foxes, Bulldogs, Dragons & Lions
- Colours: Red, Blue, Green & Yellow
- Website: https://web.archive.org/web/20110504065011/http://www.richmondparkacademy.org:80/

Shene School was formed from the amalgamation of Barnes School (Barnes) and Gainsborough School (Kew) in 1977. It was a state secondary six-form entry school with a multi-cultural pupil roll of just over 900. Uniform was mandatory. The school retained its predecessor's motto: “Enrich the Time to Come” and the school crest was a deer surmounted by a globe.

In August 2010 Richmond upon Thames Council announced that the Department for Education had approved the proposal to grant the school status as an Academy. Shene School closed and in September 2010 Richmond Park Academy opened on the same site.

=== Lift Richmond Park ===
In 2024, Richmond Park Academy renamed as Lift Richmond Park, managed by Lift Schools. The school motto also changed to 'Excellence is a Habit'.

=== Historical performance ===
As a result of unsatisfactory attainment over several years, an Ofsted report in September 2007 gave Shene School Notice to Improve. However, under the new headship of Lesley Kirby and her leadership team, the school's overall examination results improved by 12 per cent, meeting Ofsted targets and lifting the school above the Government's floor targets for 5 A* – C. A subsequent Ofsted re-visit showed that the school and its pupils, described as a capable pupil body, were satisfactorily on course to achieving further improvement. Both the leadership team and the governing body were deemed strong by the Ofsted inspectors.

An Ofsted monitoring inspection conducted in December 2011, 15 months after the school re-opened as an Academy, noted that the school had 'made good progress in raising standards' and that 'Teaching is improving, with an increasing proportion that is good or outstanding'.

According to Ofsted, the 'strong and clear leadership of the headteacher has galvanised self-belief in staff and pupils. The capacity of leaders to drive improvement has been developed at all levels'.

== Notable alumni ==
=== Richmond Park Academy ===
- Leo Woodall, British actor

=== Shene School ===
- Fara Williams, English football player for England Women and Reading WFC
- Calvin Smith, drummer of the Safety Fire
- Saul Dibb, film director (The Duchess)
- Jem Godfrey, British music producer, keyboardist and songwriter
- George Groves, super middleweight boxer
- Simon Hayes, sound engineer

=== Shene County Grammar School ===
- Robin Bextor, Head of Arts at TWI and TV director
- Prof Michael Branch CMG, former director of the School of Slavonic and East European Studies
- Richard Drummie, singer with 1980s band Go West!
- Prof Paul Lewis Hancock (1937–1998), Professor of Neotectonics at the University of Bristol
- Prof Paul Luzio, Professor of Molecular Membrane Biology since 2001 at the University of Cambridge and Director since 2002 of the Cambridge Institute for Medical Research

=== Richmond and East Sheen County School for Boys ===
- Raymon Anning CBE, Commissioner of Police of the Royal Hong Kong Police Force from 1985–89
- Prof John Carey, Merton Professor of English Literature at the University of Oxford from 1976–2001
- Henry Haig, stained glass artist
- Prof David Martin, Prof of Sociology at London School of Economics. Fellow of the British Academy
- Sir Robin McLaren CMG, ambassador to China and to the Philippines
- Jack Parker, British Olympic hurdler at Helsinki 1952 and Melbourne 1956
- Dr John Wymer, archaeologist

=== Richmond County School ===
- William J. Field, Labour MP for Paddington North from 1946–53

== Notable teachers ==
- Giselle Mather (née Prangnell), English rugby union international and coach, won 34 caps for England, part of the 1994 Women's World Cup winning side, first woman to achieve level 4 coaching status from the RFU, first woman to coach a male rugby union side, first coach of the Women's Barbarians and from 2024 coach of the Great Britain Women's rugby union sevens squad. Taught PE at the school until 1996.
