= Nature Conservancy Council =

UK government agency (1973–1991)

The logo from 1975

The Nature Conservancy Council (NCC) was a United Kingdom government agency responsible for designating and managing National Nature Reserves and other nature conservation areas in Great Britain between 1973 and 1991 (it did not cover Northern Ireland).

== Origin and Leadership ==
The NCC was established by the Nature Conservancy Council Act 1973 and replaced the Nature Conservancy, established by Royal Charter in 1949. NCC's duties included:

- Managing national nature reserves;
- Providing advice on nature conservation to national and local government;
- Notifying Sites of Special Scientific Interest;
- Undertaking certain scientific research.

Robert Edward Boote the former director of Nature Conservancy, having worked on revising its organisation was appointed by the Secretary of State for the Environment as the first Director General of the new NCC. He held this post until retiring in 1980 when Richard Charles Steele became Director General

== Structure ==
The organisation was divided into the three countries, each of which was divided in turn into regions covering several counties. Specialist groups dealt with nationwide issues, such as geology, cartography, grasslands, woodlands, birds, other taxonomic groups etc. There was a national headquarters, at first in Belgrave Square in London, but later in Peterborough.

=== Chief Scientists ===
- Peter Bridgewater (1989–1990)

== Publications ==
- Earth science conservation in Great Britain: A strategy (1990) Peterborough: Nature Conservancy Council

This publication laid out the thinking behind the Regionally important geological site which were introduced in 1990.

== Break-up ==
In 1991, following the passage of the Environmental Protection Act 1990 and the Natural Heritage (Scotland) Act 1991, the Nature Conservancy Council was divided into three:

- The Scottish part was amalgamated with the Countryside Commission for Scotland to become Scottish Natural Heritage.
- The Welsh part was amalgamated with the Welsh part of the Countryside Commission for England and Wales to become the Countryside Council for Wales.
- The remaining English part became English Nature, remaining separate from the Countryside Commission, which also became an England-only body (later these two were included in yet another body, Natural England).
- A non-statutory Joint Nature Conservation Committee (JNCC) was set up, to coordinate nature conservation between the three country agencies (and their equivalent in Northern Ireland), and to deal with the UK's contributions to international nature conservation (the JNCC later became a statutory body).
