= Paul Lewis Hancock =

British geologist

- Born: 26 March 1937; London
- Died: 9 December 1998 (aged 61); Bristol UK
- Education: Durham University
- Known for: Editor of Journal of Structural Geology
- Scientific career
- Fields: Geology; Geomechanics
- Workplaces: Bristol University

Paul Lewis Hancock (26 March 1937 – 9 December 1998) was a British geologist and editor of Journal of Structural Geology (Editor-in-Chief, 1979-1985; Founding Editor, 1986-1998).

== Early life and education ==
Paul Lewis Hancock was born in London on 26 March 1937. He graduated from Sheen Grammar School and later Durham University.

== Career ==
His professional career started as lecturer in geology at Nottingham Trent Polytechnic 1964 then Strathclyde Polytechnic 1966-1969 Bristol University (1969–81), reader (1981–95) and professor of Neotectonics (1995–98).

In 1978, he conceived the Journal of Structural Geology with the Peter Henn at Pergamon Press. From 1979-1985, he was Editor-in-Chief and in 1986-1998 Founding Editor of the Magazine.

Hancock died of bone cancer in Bristol on 9 December 1998.

== Personal life ==
Hancock was married twice Janet Hancock Died 03/2017(1964-1988) Anne Hancock Died 07/2017 (1993-) and had a son Nigel Hancock(1965) and a daughter Ruth Hancock(1968).

== Bibliography ==
- Paul L. Hancock (ed.) Continental deformation. - Publisher:Oxford, New York: Pergamon Press. - 1994. - 421 p. - ISBN 978-0080379302
