= Adel al-Fadhel =

Bahraini politician

- عادل الفاضل

Director of the Bahrain National Security Agency
- In office November 28, 2011 – August 4, 2016
- Monarch: Hamad bin Isa Al Khalifa
- Prime Minister: Khalifa bin Salman Al Khalifa, Salman, Crown Prince of Bahrain
- Preceded by: Khalifa bin Abdullah Al Khalifa; Talal bin Muhammad Al Khalifa
- Succeeded by: Talal bin Muhammad Al Khalifa
- Incumbent
- Assumed office September 13, 2017

Deputy Interior Minister
- In office August 4, 2016 – September 13, 2017
- Monarch: Hamad bin Isa Al Khalifa
- Prime Minister: Khalifa bin Salman Al Khalifa
- Succeeded by: Talal bin Muhammad Al Khalifa

Personal details
- Born: Adel Khalifa Hamad Al-Fadhel
- Education: Saad Al-Abdullah Academy for Security Sciences
- Occupation: soldier, police officer
- Awards: Bahrain Medal, First Class (2013)

Military service
- Years of service: 1977—Present

Lieutenant General Adel al-Fadhel (Arabic: عادل الفاضل) is a Bahraini soldier and politician.

== Early life and education ==
He belongs to the Al-Fadhel family, considered a branch of the Bani Utbah by way of his grandfather Fadhel bin Khalifa Al-Khalifa Al-Atabi.

He obtained a Bachelor of Laws from the Saad Al-Abdullah Academy for Security Sciences, the official college of the Kuwait Police. He completed many courses, most notably a specialized International Security Leadership program at the Police Staff College, Bramshill, in the United Kingdom and an advanced executive course in Security Sciences at Harvard University but also others on combating organized crime, terrorism financing, and money laundering.

== Career ==
Al-Fadhel began working at the Ministry of Interior in October 1977 and would run its drug enforcement division from 1981 to 2001. In 2001, he was promoted to head the money laundering and INTERPOL relations division, heading them until 2005 along with the Department for Combating Economic Crimes that he added to his portfolio in 2002. From 2005 to 2007, he served as Director-General of the Northern Governorate Police Department, during which he intercepted a 35-person Shiite extremist cell aiming to blow up several Ministry buses and cars and kill policemen.

On July 2, 2007, he was appointed as an agent of the National Security Agency (BNSA). On November 28, 2011, he was promoted to acting director of the Agency, confirmed as Official Director that December 27 with the rank of Minister. In July 2013, he was appointed Minister of State for Internal Affairs, a post from which he was removed in December 2014 in a cabinet reshuffle before the third session of Parliament opened.

In 2016, Al-Fadhel was promoted to Deputy Interior Minister, and in 2017 he was restored by King Hamad bin Isa Al Khalifa to the head of the BNSA as part of an effort to reorganize the agency. He has attended many Arab and global conferences on prosecuting drug and organized crime, including those of the United Nations Congress on Crime Prevention and Criminal Justice and the Arab League’s Arab Interior Ministers' Council.

=== Committees ===
He has served on the following committees:

- Working Group on Combating Human Trafficking (2002)
- National Committee for Standards and Metrology (2004)
- Head of the delegation assigned to follow up on Bahraini detainees at Guantanamo Bay detention camp (2004)
- Supreme Military Court of Appeal (2005)
- Chairman of the Technical Committee of the National Program for Drug Control (2006)
- Chairman of the Joint Committee for Developing Drug Risk Awareness (2007)
- Supreme Defence Council (2008)
- Supreme Council for Military Retirement (2013)

== Bahraini uprising of 2011 ==
After the suppression of opposition protests during the Bahraini uprising of 2011, Al-Fadhel was accused of involvement in human rights violations and his prosecution was urged by the Bahrain Center for Human Rights due to widespread use of torture. Jawad Fairooz, a former Council of Representatives member for the Shia opposition party Al Wefaq, stated that he was personally interrogated by Al-Fadhel upon his arrest by the BNSA in May 2011.

In April 2014, as Minister of State for Internal Affairs, Al-Fadhel ordered the deportation of Bahraini-Iranian cleric Hussein Mirza Abdul-Baqi Muhammad Abdul-Razzaq (known as Hussein Najati). The opposition alleged that this was retaliation for Najati’s refusal to disavow opposition ayatollah Isa Qassim and renounce violence as well as his insistence on running for election in the 2014 Bahraini general election. The Ministry replied that “Najati operated without coordinating with the authorities and made clear his loyalties to Ali Al-Sistani without carrying the papers specifying his duties that such a representative must provide by law.”

== Awards ==
- Bahraini Medal, First Class (2013)
