= Bruche Police National Training Centre =

Training complex in Warrington, England

Bruche Police Training Centre, Warrington, Lancashire was a training complex for probationary police officers in the United Kingdom. The site in a suburb of Warrington was operated by CENTREX, the 'Central Police Training and Development Authority'. It opened in January 1946 and closed in May 2006.

== Accommodation ==
Bruche was originally opened to provide accommodation for U.S. Army Air Force officers during the Second World War. It opened as a police training college in January 1946, as a temporary site to accommodate the number of police officers being trained after the Second World War. In 1955, it was one of the two UK police training centres that accommodated female police officers.

== Curriculum ==
Police forces from the northern part of England and Wales sent new recruits to the centre for the main part of their basic training, which consisted of the development of important attitudes and behaviours, law training and officer safety tactics. Training included several role-play scenarios to enable the development and assessment of important abilities. Newly recruited probationary officers would spend a solid 15 weeks at Bruche before ever stepping onto the street, after having also spent time at their own Force's regional training centre(s).

The centre was the site of Sandford, a mock village used for law enforcement training. The training village allowed police recruits could engage in simulations of routine police activities such as dealing with traffic accidents, football hooligans, and investigating robberies. Criminals, victims and bystanders were portrayed by civilian locals of the Bruche area.

== Secret Policeman documentary ==
In 2003, an investigative journalist trained undercover at Bruche, and exposed some police officers that used racist behaviour and language. The film was broadcast by the BBC Panorama programme in an episode called 'The Secret Policeman'.

== Closure ==
Bruche was the only police training centre to remain in constant use throughout the years during the UK police forces used such facilities In May 2006, Bruche was closed because individual police forces became responsible for training their recruits internally. In 2013, Warrington Council gave permission for 220 houses to be built on the site.

== Police forces trained ==
The police forces that sent officers to Bruche were mainly:

- North Wales Police
- South Yorkshire Police
- West Yorkshire Police
- Greater Manchester Police
- Lancashire Constabulary
- Cumbria Constabulary
- Merseyside Police
- Cheshire Constabulary
- British Transport Police
- Humberside Police
- Lincolnshire Police
- North Yorkshire Police
- Isle of Man Constabulary
- West Midlands Police
- Thames Valley Police

== Other police training schools ==
Forces in other parts of the country usually sent their recruits to similar centres at Ashford in Kent, Aykley Heads in Durham, Ryton-on-Dunsmore in Warwickshire and Cwmbran in South Wales. When the police training system changed in 2006 Ashford, Cwmbran and Bruche centres closed. Ryton is now used for other police and Immigration Service training. Aykley Heads (Durham) is now used to train Durham Constabulary and Northumbria Police Officers, as well as being Durham Constabulary HQ.
