= Grosvenor Hall (estate) =

- Interactive map of the Grosvenor Hall area
- Former names: Ashford Police Training Centre (1973–2006) Grosvenor Sanatorium (1913–1955) Bockhanger Hall (1875–1913)

General information
- Location: Ashford, Kent, England
- Coordinates: 51.168°N 0.873°E
- Owner: PGL Travel (since 2025)

Website
- schoolsandgroups.pgl.co.uk/centres/grosvenor-hall/

Grosvenor Hall is an estate in Kennington, Ashford, Kent. At first a sanitorium, it was repurposed as a training site for police recruits and called the Ashford Police Training Centre between 1973 and 2006. It is now a youth educational and adventure centre.

== Early years ==
Grosvenor Hall was originally called Bockhanger Hall and built in 1875 by James S. Burra (1838–1911), an Ashford banker. Burra was a keen arborist and the Hall was surrounded by a collection of trees (many of which were destroyed in the storm of 1987). In 1913 the Hall and estate were purchased by Percy H. Jones, who converted it into a tuberculosis sanatorium. He transferred patients from a sanatorium called Grosvenor House in Sandgate, Kent, and renamed Bockhanger Hall to Grosvenor Hall. During its time as a sanatorium a notable patient was the poet and philosopher Simone Weil, who died there on 24 August 1943.

Advances in antibiotics following the Second World War gradually made tuberculosis sanatoriums obsolete. Grosvenor Hall closed as such in 1955, became a private clinic from 1956 to 1958 and then a conference centre.

== Police training centre ==
Ashford PTC badge

In 1961 Grosvenor Hall was bought by the Metropolitan Police for use as a cadet training school. New classrooms and dormitory blocks were constructed in the estate. During this period Metropolitan Police cadet training was split between Hendon and Ashford, but in 1972 was moved completely to Hendon.

The Grosvenor Hall estate was bought by the Home Office for use as a regional training centre on 1 January 1973 and was officially opened by Mark Carlisle, the Secretary of State for the Home Office on 6 July 1973. Staff, including the first commandant, were moved from a training centre at Nutfield in Surrey which was closed down. To begin with Ashford was used for continuation courses (see below), the initial training being provided at Sandgate in Kent and Eynsham Hall near Oxford. However Sandgate closed in 1975 and Eynsham Hall closed on 22 May 1981 consolidating all probationer training for the south east region at Ashford.

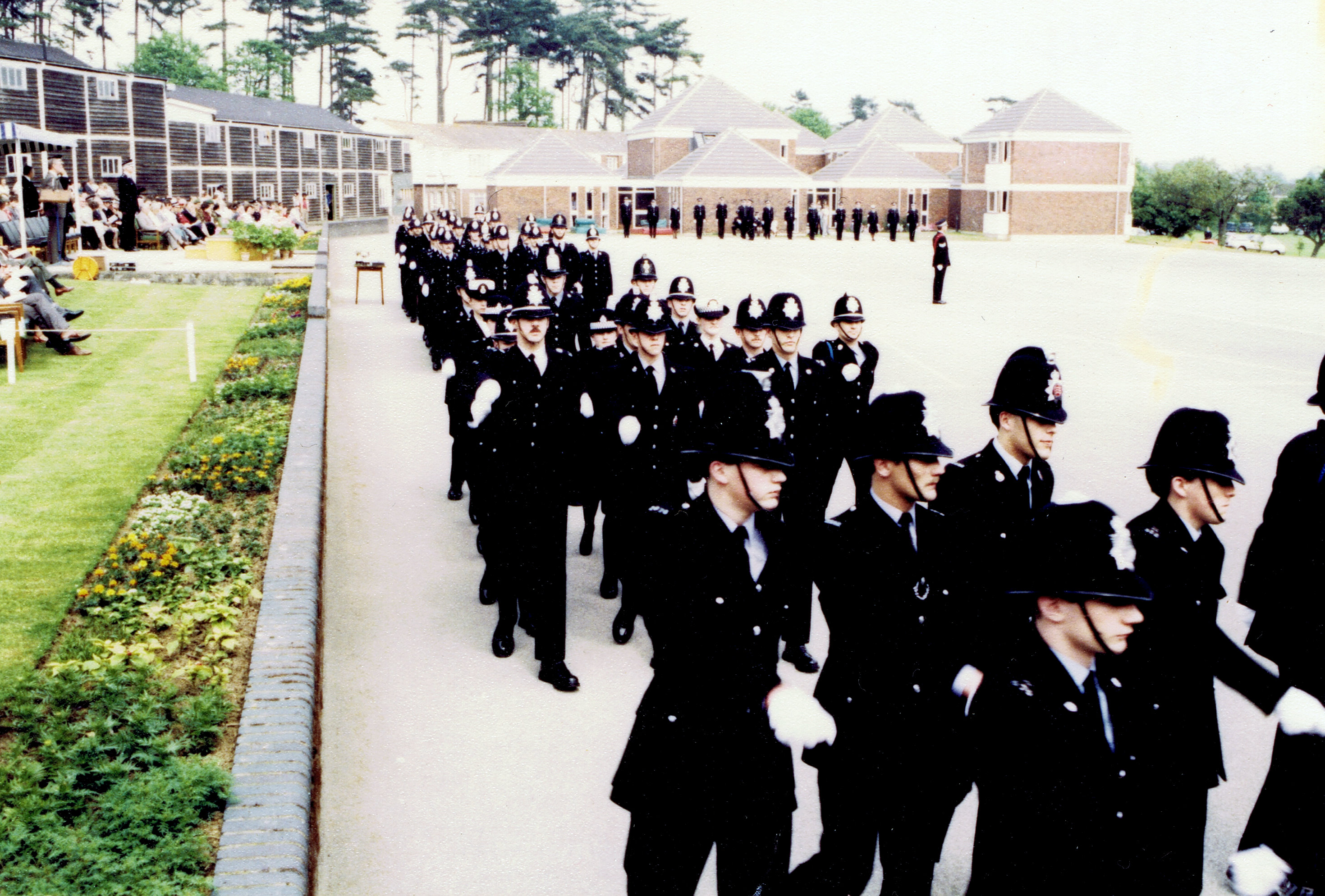
A typical passing out parade at Ashford PTC in 1984. The drill sergeant can be seen wearing a red sash in the centre of the parade ground.

Although Ashford PTC had the ability to accept overflow from anywhere in England and Wales it usually trained recruits from the following forces:

- Hampshire Constabulary
- Kent Police
- Suffolk Constabulary
- Sussex Police
- Surrey Police
- Essex Police
- City of London Police
- Royal Parks Police
- British Transport Police
- States of Jersey Police
- Guernsey Police
- Hertfordshire Constabulary
- Buckinghamshire Constabulary
- Cambridgeshire Constabulary
- Thames Valley Police
- Norfolk Constabulary

In 2006 police training in England and Wales underwent a significant change. All initial training was de-regionalised and became non-residential. Ashford PTC and the other remaining regional training centres, Aykley Heads in Durham, Bruche in Warrington, Cwmbran in Wales, Ryton in Ryton-on-Dunsmore and Shotley in Ipswich were closed.

In 2014, The Times reported on a Facebook group for former Ashford attendees, after a member of the group brought it to their attention. One image posted to the group shows trainee police officers at Ashford in costume using blackface and Nazi symbols, and another shows female trainees posing in suspenders. The officer, whose name was not given, described Ashford as "a drink fest and a shag fest."

== Current owner ==
Grosvenor Hall was bought by Kingswood Learning and Leisure Ltd (part of Inspiring Learning) in 2010 and turned into an outdoor education and adventure centre.

Inspiring Learning and its subsidiaries went into administration in January 2025, closing all their sites, except three of them, with Grosvenor Hall being one, which were acquired by PGL Travel.
