= William Curzon-Siggers =

William Curzon-Siggers (6 May 1860 – 20 September 1947) was an Anglican priest and author in the late 19th century and the first half of the 20th century.

Curzon-Siggers was educated at St Boniface Missionary College, Warminster; St Augustine's College, Canterbury and University College, Durham; and ordained deacon in 1882 and priest in 1887. After Curacies in Pretoria and Ashmansworth he was vicar of Ravenswood from 1886 to 1887 then of Normanton until 1889. He was priest in charge of Lutwyche from 1889 to 1890 and then the Minister at Hamilton, Victoria until 1891. He was the priest in charge at St Stephen, Ballarat from 1891 until 1895; and vicar of St. Matthew, Dunedin from 1886 until 1922. He was archdeacon of Southland from 1920 until he retired in 1933.
