= Mike Cunningham (police officer) =

British police officer

Mike Cunningham CBE QPM

Chief Executive of the College of Policing
- In office 15 January 2018 – December 2020
- Preceded by: Alex Marshall
- Succeeded by: Andy Marsh

Personal details
- Born: Michael Bernard Cunningham; July 1961 (age 65)

Michael Bernard Cunningham CBE QPM (born July 1961) is a former senior British Police officer and was the Chief Executive of the College of Policing between 15 January 2018 and December 2020. Prior to this role, he was HM Inspector of Constabulary from 2014 to 2017.

== Early life and education ==
Cunningham graduated from the University of Durham with a theology degree in 1984. Before joining the police he was a teacher for two years. In 2014, Staffordshire University bestowed the award of Honorary Doctor in recognition of his significant contribution to policing and law and order.

== Police career ==
Cunningham joined Lancashire Constabulary in 1987 and after completing the police Strategic Command Course in 2005, he became Assistant Chief Constable, taking responsibility for operational policing. He later was the Chief Constable of Staffordshire Police from September 2009 to 2014. In July 2014, he was appointed Her Majesty’s Inspector of Constabulary.

In January 2018, he became the chief executive of College of Policing.

Despite announcing his retirement from policing, in April 2021 Cunningham joined Skills for Justice as an associate to "keep police leaders ahead of their game today to develop a service fit for tomorrow".

== Honours ==

Cunningham was awarded the Queen's Police Medal in the 2013 New Year Honours and was appointed Commander of the Order of the British Empire (CBE) in the 2021 Birthday Honours for services to policing and public service.
