= National Policing Improvement Agency =

Former public body in the United Kingdom

- Abbreviation: NPIA

Agency overview
- Formed: 1 April 2007
- Preceding agencies: Police Information Technology Organisation (PITO); Centrex; National Police Training; Police Staff College
- Dissolved: 7 October 2013
- Superseding agency: College of Policing; Serious Organised Crime Agency (now National Crime Agency); Home Office
- Employees: 1,629 (September 2011); 2,100 (2009)
- Annual budget: £380M (2011/12); £474M (2008/09)

Jurisdictional structure
- National agency (Operations jurisdiction): UK
- Operations jurisdiction: UK
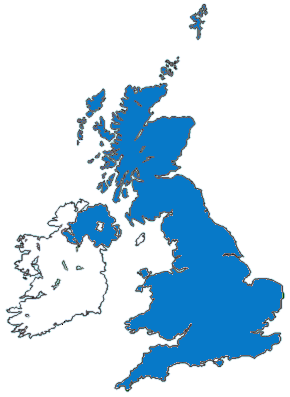
- England and Wales, Scotland, Northern Ireland
- Area: 244 821 km² / 94,526 sq mi
- Population: 60,609,153
- Legal jurisdiction: England and Wales, less in Scotland and Northern Ireland
- Governing body: Home Office

Operational structure
- Headquarters: London

The National Policing Improvement Agency (NPIA) was a non-departmental public body in the United Kingdom, established to support police by providing expertise in such areas as information technology, information sharing, and recruitment.

It was announced in December 2011 that the NPIA would be gradually wound down and its functions transferred to other organisations. By December 2012, all operations had been transferred to the Home Office, the Serious Organised Crime Agency (SOCA) and the newly established College of Policing. SOCA was itself replaced by the National Crime Agency on 7 October 2013 as a feature of the Crime and Courts Act 2013, which also formally abolished the NPIA.

== History ==
The motivations for creating the National Policing Improvement Agency were laid out in the 2004 Police Reform white paper Building Communities, Beating Crime which stated: "...the mechanisms for national policing improvements are disparate and overlapping." Additionally, in 2004 Hazel Blears commissioned an end-to-end review of the Police Information Technology Organisation (PITO) which concluded that "The tripartite governance structure is inappropriate for efficiently and effectively delivering services" and that "PITO as a concept is fundamentally flawed".

The NPIA was proposed by the Association of Chief Police Officers for England & Wales (ACPO) as a response to the UK government's green paper Building Safer Communities Together. The stated objective of the NPIA was to support the delivery of more effective policing and foster a culture of self-improvement around policing in the United Kingdom. Unlike PITO, it was planned that it would not be solely a supplier of national police IT systems. The key priorities of the NPIA were set by the National Policing Board, established in July 2006 to help strengthen the governance of policing in England and Wales. The National Policing Board, chaired by the Home Secretary, has a tripartite membership from the Home Office, ACPO and the Association of Police Authorities (APA).

The Police and Justice Act 2006 created the NPIA in law, and it became operational on 1 April 2007. Upon formation, the estimated staff of the NPIA was 1772, and the expected income for 2007–08 was £484m . The agency took over the work of several precursor agencies including the Police Information Technology Organisation (PITO), Centrex (including the National Centre for Policing Excellence), and a small number of Home Office staff. PITO and Centrex were both abolished when the NPIA became operational. The NPIA had formal responsibilities in respect of police forces in England and Wales but, unlike PITO, not for the eight Scottish forces.

Chief Constable Peter Neyroud was the agency's first Chief Executive. He retired from the police service in December 2010 after submitting an independent review of police training and leadership to the Home Secretary. NPIA Deputy Chief Executive Nick Gargan was temporarily promoted to Chief Constable and became temporary Chief Executive of the NPIA in September 2010, when Neyroud began his independent review – the appointments were confirmed in January 2011.

Peter Holland DL was appointed as the first chair of the NPIA board in September 2006 and was extended in his role as chair by the Home Secretary in late 2010, when Neyroud announced his retirement. The board had representatives of the tripartite governance of policing: ACPO, APA and the Home Office.

The NPIA had a number of challenges to meet, the implementation of the Bichard Inquiry after the Soham Murders and the McFarland Report regarding police IT and PITO, made the development, implementation and standardisation of new police technologies a major national priority. The development of doctrine and policy in conjunction with the Association of Chief Police Officers (ACPO), encouraging a national police strategy in terms of purchasing of equipment and bringing about universal police standards in areas such as training, development and leadership were all fundamental priorities and objectives of the agency. The HMIC report 'Closing the Gap' recommended closer working and partnerships especially in strategic areas such as protective service, and the first trial Collaboration Demonstration Sites were announced by the Home Office.

In 2007, Peter Neyroud said that by creating a consensus with police forces and having some powers to mandate IT strategy over police forces, the agency would succeed where PITO had failed.

The agency was the subject of critical comment (externally and internally) as a consequence of high levels of staff turnover and the results of a damaging staff survey in the first year of its operation, which revealed high levels of staff dissatisfaction on a range of issues. Difficulties with recruitment and retention necessitated high levels of expenditure on contractors and private sector consultants to maintain service provision in some business units.

On 1 April 2008, the Assets Recovery Agency was merged into the Serious Organised Crime Agency. The ARA Centre of Excellence, which trained and accredited Financial Investigators, was moved to the National Policing Improvement Agency where it was called the Proceeds of Crime Centre.

=== Replacement ===
The government set out its ambitions for the future of policing in its 2010 white paper, Policing the 21st Century. This stated that

The NPIA has done much to bring about welcome changes to policing. In particular, it has acted as a catalyst for identifying areas for efficiency gains within forces, encouraging greater collaboration and identifying where economies of scale can be realised through national procurement frameworks. It has succeeded in the first stage of rationalising a number of different agencies responsible for supporting police forces. But now is the right time to phase out the NPIA, reviewing its role and how this translates into a streamlined national landscape.

The Home Secretary Theresa May gave a speech to the House of Commons on 15 December 2011 in which she unveiled plans to replace the NPIA with a new police professional body and a separate company responsible for procuring information technology for police forces. The NPIA was due to be replaced by these new organisations during 2012.

On 1 April 2012, the Missing Persons Bureau, Central Witness Bureau, Specialist Operations Centre, Crime Operational Support and Serious Crime Analysis Section transferred from the National Policing Improvement Agency to the Serious Organised Crime Agency (SOCA), as an interim measure ahead of SOCA's migration into the new National Crime Agency on 7 October 2013.

The NPIA retained responsibility for the training and accreditation of financial investigators until that moved to the National Crime Agency. However the Proceeds of Crime Centre was hosted for the NPIA by SOCA from October 2012.

By December 2012, all other remaining NPIA operations had transferred to the Home Office (who took on the IT functions), SOCA and the newly established College of Policing (who took on training, workforce related functions and the National Police Library).

A detailed statement of where NPIA operations transferred is on the agency's website.

In September 2012 Nick Gargan was seconded to HM Inspectorate of Constabulary before becoming Chief Constable of Avon and Somerset in March 2013. Paul Minton, the Deputy Chief Executive of the NPIA, became acting chief executive and acting chief constable in September 2012 up to 31 December 2012.

Peter Holland's term of office as Chair expired on 31 December 2012. He was succeeded by Chris Hughes, who had chaired the NPIA's audit and risk committee.

After the transfer of operational functions, a small team remained in the agency to close it down. The NPIA was closed on 7 October 2013 on the coming into force of the Crime and Courts Act.

== Objectives ==
To achieve its objectives, the NPIA co-ordinated organisational change across policy, processes, staff and technology both at national programme level and also with the county forces. For police information technology, the NPIA built upon ACPO's information systems Strategy 'ISS4PS', which called on the police service to work together to adopt common standards, products and services.

The NPIA provided the following functions at a national level:

- National information systems such as the Police National Computer, National DNA Database and IDENT1 (the national fingerprint and palm print system)
- Specialist training for high-tech crime, forensics and major investigations
- Clear and secure voice communication through the Airwave service
- Round the clock specialist operational policing advice to guide forces through murder investigations, public order events, major incidents and searches
- National development programmes to nurture the next generation of police officers at all levels from PC to the senior ranks.

== Training ==
The NPIA offered training courses at four core sites:

- Bramshill Leadership Academy which was also home to the European Police College Secretariat known as CEPOL, International Police Leadership Programmes and programmes related to the development of future police leaders and management within the UK Police Services.
- Wyboston in Bedfordshire, was home to Specialist Hi-Tech Police Training including e-crime, e- forensics, covert crime and training using Hydra and Minerva immersive simulators to construct major crime management scenarios and events in real time.
- Harperley Hall near Crook in County Durham, was the NPIA's specialist forensic training facility and had undergone a £10 million upgrade.
- Ryton-on-Dunsmore – Chemical, biological, radiation and nuclear training (CBRN) is carried out at the Police National CBRN Centre at Winterbourne Gunner in Wiltshire, in conjunction with the CBRN HQ at the NPIA's Ryton-on-Dunsmore facility, which is also an operational training base and the HQ for ACPO's Vehicle and Truck Crime Initiatives.

The Bramshill and Harrogate centres transferred to the ownership of the Home Office on the NPIA's cessation of operations, with the College of Policing renting space. The Ryton and Harperley Hall sites and the tenancy at Wyboston passed to the newly formed College of Policing.

== Technology ==
The NPIA took on much of the work of the former Police Information Technology Organisation.

This included:

- Management of the use of the Airwave communication network by UK police forces
- Corporate Data Model (CorDM) and Corporate XML (CorXML) for the Police Service
- HOLMES2 and CasWeb
- IDENT1
- Identity Access Management (IAM)
- Impact Nominal Index
- Information Systems Strategy for the Police Service (ISS4PS)
- Lantern
- Mobile Information
- National Firearms Licensing Management System (NFLMS)
- National Management Information System (NMIS)
- National Strategy for Police Information Systems (NSPIS)
  - Browser Access
  - Command and Control (CnC)
  - Custody and Case Preparation Programme
  - Human Resources (HR)
- National Video Identification Strategy (NVIS)
- PentiP – Penalty Notice Processing
- PNN – Police National Network
- Police National Computer (PNC)
- The Vehicle Procedures and Fixed Penalty Office (VP/FPO) system
- ViSOR – Dangerous Persons Database

The Facial Images National Database (FIND) project, and a project to deliver a national case management system for child abuse investigations, were cancelled in early 2008 due to budget pressures.

== See also ==
- List of law enforcement agencies in the United Kingdom, Crown Dependencies and British Overseas Territories
- Forensic Science Service
- LGC Forensics
- Bramshill Police College
- Scottish Police College
- Garda Síochána College
- Jill Dando Institute
- Cambridge Institute of Criminology
- National Police Library
