= Centrex (police training agency) =

Centrex, the common name of the Central Police Training and Development Authority (CPTDA), was established under Part 4 of the Criminal Justice and Police Act 2001, and was the primary means of police training in England and Wales. It was based at Bramshill House, formerly known as the Police Staff College, Bramshill. Centrex had the responsibility for many aspects of police training and development. There had been a move away from running police training centres to running police trainee/initial probationer courses in-house under the auspices of Centrex. Centrex was replaced by the National Policing Improvement Agency (NPIA) on 1 April 2007.

Centrex was responsible for overseeing the design and delivery of probationer training, investigators training and other key areas. Centrex was also responsible for evaluating police training to see if it actually works. Centrex also set the national police promotion exams, probationer development tests, and advised on the assessment of recruits. Centrex was staffed by a mixture of non-police officers (civil servants) and seconded police officers. Centrex had five main Foundation Training sites at Ashford, Kent, Bruche, St Dials in Cwmbran, Ryton-on-Dunsmore and Aykley Heads in Durham.

Centrex was formerly known as National Police Training (NPT).

From 1 April 2007, the functions of Centrex and other bodies were merged into the National Policing Improvement Agency (NPIA). The NPIA itself replaced by the National Crime agency in 2013.

== See also ==
- Policing in the United Kingdom
- National Policing Improvement Agency
