= Journal of Structural Geology =

- Discipline: Structural geology
- Language: English
- Edited by: G. Ian Alsop

Publication details
- History: 1979-present
- Publisher: Elsevier
- Frequency: Monthly
- Impact factor: 2.884 (2014)

Standard abbreviations
- ISO 4: J. Struct. Geol.

Indexing
- CODEN: JSGEDY
- ISSN: 0191-8141
- LCCN: 80649916
- OCLC no.: 4967864

Links
- Journal homepage; Online archive

The Journal of Structural Geology is a monthly peer-reviewed scientific journal covering on the field of structural geology. It is published by Elsevier and the editor-in-chief is G. Ian Alsop (University of Aberdeen). According to the Journal Citation Reports, the journal has a 2014 impact factor of 2.884.
