= College of Policing =

Professional body for police in England and Wales

College of Policing Limited
- Predecessor: National Policing Improvement Agency
- Formation: December 2012
- Type: Non-departmental public body operating as an independent arm's length body.
- Headquarters: Ryton-on-Dunsmore, Warwickshire, England
- Coordinates: 52.3549°N 1.4414°W
- Region served: England and Wales
- Interim chief executive officer: Jo Noakes
- Website: www.college.police.uk

The College of Policing, in the United Kingdom, is an operationally independent non-departmental public body operating as the professional body for police in England and Wales.

The college contributes to the professional development of police in England and Wales while working to support professional and accountable policing across the entire United Kingdom more widely, and Internationally.

The college is based in Ryton-on-Dunsmore, Warwickshire, which is also home to The National Police Library, United Kingdom. The organisation operates as an arm's length body of the Home Office and was established in 2012 to take over a number of training and development roles that were the responsibility of the National Policing Improvement Agency (NPIA).

As a professional body, The College of Policing, principally, is not a training provider - which is the role of training teams in respective police forces - but instead contributes to training, professional development and practice more widely. For example, the college produces guidance for trainers delivering training within forces, and produces guidance for officers known as 'Authorised Professional Practice'. The college also operates CollegeLearn, an online learning platform which is often accessed as part of an officer's wider training within their respective police force.

== History ==
The creation of a new policing professional body was announced by the Home Secretary in December 2011. Representatives from the Police Federation, the Superintendents' Association, ACPO and UNISON worked with the Home Office to create the college, ensuring that it represents the police service's desires and aspirations. As soon as Parliamentary time allows, the College of Policing will be established as a statutory body, independent of government. While the necessary legislation is prepared, the college has been established as a company limited by guarantee.

The college officially launched in December 2012, with former chief constable of Hampshire, Alex Marshall, as chief executive officer and Deputy Chief Constable of Avon and Somerset Police Rob Beckley as chief operating officer. Beckley moved from Avon and Somerset to the Metropolitan Police and Home Office in 2016, whilst Marshall retired from policing in September 2017. In 2018, Marshall was replaced by Mike Cunningham, former chief constable of Staffordshire Police and a HM Inspector of Constabulary. In 2021, Cunningham was replaced by Andy Marsh, the former chief constable of Hampshire and Avon and Somerset. In September 2026, Marsh left the College following his appointment as His Majesty's Chief Inspector of Constabulary and Fire & Rescue Services, with effect from 1 October 2026. Jo Noakes, previously the College's chief operating officer, was subsequently appointed interim chief executive officer.

== Authorised Professional Practice ==
The college produces guidance for officers across the United Kingdom, known as Authorised Professional Practice (APP). This covers topics such as firearms, stop and search, covert policing and investigations.

APP is subject to continual review and update. In the first quarter of 2022, for example, there were 46 updates made to 20 individual APP categories.

=== Non-crime hate incidents ===
In 2014, the college advised police forces to record all 'non-crime hate incidents' - incidents that are perceived to be motivated by hostility but are not criminal offences.

In December 2021, the Court of Appeal ruled that this guidance was unlawful and constituted a "chilling effect ... on the legitimate exercise of freedom of expression". As a result, the guidance now states that freedom of speech should be prioritised where possible and that non-crime hate incidents should not be recorded where they are "trivial, irrational or malicious, or where there is no basis to conclude that an incident was motivated by hostility."

Four years later, on 1 September 2025, after the arrest by five officers at Heathrow Airport of Graham Linehan, arriving on a flight from the US, sparked a backlash from some public figures and politicians, the Metropolitan Police announced that they would no longer investigate non-crime hate incidents.

== Education requirements ==
The College of Policing has announced that from 2020, all new police officers in England and Wales will have to be educated to degree level. This policy will be administered through the Policing Education Qualifications Framework (PEQF), which creates three entry routes into the police:

- The Pre-Join Policing Degree: This entry route involves completion of a three-year knowledge-based degree in professional policing prior to joining the police service. Becoming a special constable may be included as part of this programme. Candidates who are subsequently recruited will undertake practice-based training to develop specific skills and will be assessed against national assessment criteria in order to demonstrate operational competence.
- The Degree Holder Entry Programme (DHEP): Aimed at degree-holders whose first degree is in a subject area other than policing. This two-year practice-based programme enables candidates to perform the role of police constable. Successful completion, results in the achievement of a graduate diploma in professional policing practice
- The Police Constable Degree Apprenticeship: This is a professional degree-level apprenticeship, enabling new recruits to join the police service as an apprentice police constable and earn while they learn. During the three-year programme the apprentice will complete a degree in professional policing practice and will be assessed against national assessment criteria as an integral part of their degree apprenticeship. The apprenticeship will enable non-graduates to enter the police profession, enabling them to earn a degree in Professional Policing Practice whilst 'on-the-job' as part of a three-year initial training and education programme, meaning that not having a degree will not bar non-graduates from initially entering the service.

== National Police Library ==
The National Police Library is operated at the college to support everyone working in UK policing; providing access to digital and print resources. It holds publications such as the Police Review magazine and Police Gazette. The latter has supported operational policing and its archives have enabled investigators to understand policing in the recent past; providing evidence for public inquiries such as the Hillsborough disaster.
