= Nigel Badnell =

British physicist

Professor Nigel Robert Badnell (27 October 1958 – 3 September 2024) was a British physicist, at University of Strathclyde and an Elected Fellow of the American Physical Society.
