= Owen Dampier Bennett =

Owen Cyril Dampier Bennett was Dean of Nassau from 1921 until 1934.

Dampier Bennett was educated at University College, Durham (1898) and ordained in 1903. After curacies in Newchurch, Lancashire, and Paddington, he was rector of Abberley before his time as dean and vicar of Ringmer afterwards.
