= Peter Bridgewater =

Australian conservationist

Professor Peter Bridgewater (born 31 December 1945) is an Australian conservationist.

== Biography ==
Bridgewater completed a Bachelor of Science in botany at Durham University in 1967. He stayed on to complete a doctorate at the same institution.

=== Career ===
Bridgewater was chief scientist of the UK Nature Conservancy Council 1989–1990 and chief executive of the Australian Nature Conservation Agency and director of the National Parks and Wildlife Service (1990–1997). He was secretary of UNESCO's Man and the Biosphere Programme and director of its Division of Ecological Sciences 1999–2003.

He was chair of the International Whaling Commission from 1995 to 1997. From 2011 to 2014 he served as a visiting professor at the United Nations University in Japan.
