= Alex Marshall (police officer) =

Alex Marshall CBE QPM

Chief Executive of the College of Policing
- In office February 2013 – September 2017
- Preceded by: New office
- Succeeded by: Mike Cunningham

Personal details
- Born: Alexander John Marshall; 7 December 1961 (age 64) Barnet, London

Alexander John Marshall (born 7 December 1961) is a retired senior British police officer who was the chief executive of the College of Policing from 2013 to 2017. Prior to this role, he was chief constable of Hampshire Constabulary from 2008 to 2013.

In September 2017, Marshall retired from policing to work for the International Cricket Council (ICC), as general manager of its Anti-Corruption Unit.

Marshall is currently the general manager of the ICC Integrity Unit which includes, anti-corruption, anti-doping, security and safeguarding.

== Early life and education ==
Marshall studied at Wolfson College, Cambridge and the Institute of Criminology, University of Cambridge. He became a Cropwood Fellow in 1999. He obtained a master's degree in criminology at the University of Cambridge in 2006.

== Police career ==
Marshall started his career in 1980 with the Metropolitan Police Service and worked mainly in South London, including South West Area Territorial Support Group (TSG) and as an inspector in Lambeth. Marshall was a detective chief inspector in the Metropolitan Police, Anti-Corruption Command. In 2000 he transferred on promotion to Cambridgeshire Constabulary. During this time he also worked as a consultant for the Home Office on bureaucracy in frontline policing. In 2004 he joined the chief constable's team in Thames Valley Police and was appointed chief constable in Hampshire Constabulary in 2008. In 2013, Marshall became the inaugural CEO and chief constable of the College of Policing; the professional body and standard setting organisation for policing in England and Wales. Marshall retired from UK policing in 2017.

== Honours ==

Ribbon	Description	Notes
	Order of the British Empire (CBE)	2018
	Queen's Police Medal (QPM)	2009
	Queen Elizabeth II Golden Jubilee Medal	
	Queen Elizabeth II Diamond Jubilee Medal	
	Police Long Service and Good Conduct Medal	

Marshall received the Queen's Police Medal in the Queen's 2009 Birthday Honours. Marshall received the Commander of the Most Excellent Order of the British Empire in the Queen's 2018 Birthday Honours.

Police appointments
Preceded by Paul Kernaghan	Chief Constable of Hampshire Constabulary; 2008 to 2013	Succeeded by Andy Marsh
New title	Chief Executive/Chief Constable of the College of Policing; 2013 to 2017	Succeeded by Mike Cunningham
