= Clare Cameron =

British civil servant

Clare Cameron (née Caldin; born 5 September 1980) is a British senior civil servant. She has served as Director of Defence Innovation at the Ministry of Defence since 2019.

== Biography ==
Cameron was born on 5 September 1980 in London to Giles Caldin and Rachel Caldin. She attended Cheltenham Ladies’ College. She graduated from University College, Durham in 2002 with a degree in History. While at university, she was a representative for the Durham Students' Union and joined protests against rising tuition fees and the Iraq War. In 2013, she married Brigadier Peter Cameron. She has one son, one stepson, and one stepdaughter.

She applied to the Civil Service fast stream and joined the Ministry of Defence in June 2003. After she finished her time with the fast stream, she was deployed to the Helmand Province, Afghanistan for six months as Policy Advisor to the British Commander. She was appointed Director of Defence Innovation in 2019.
