= Police Review =

British weekly magazine for police officers

- Editor: Chris Herbert
- Frequency: Weekly
- Publisher: Jane's Information Group
- Founded: 1893
- Final issue: November 2011
- Country: United Kingdom
- Language: English
- Website: policereview.com

Police Review (also known as Jane's Police Review) was a weekly magazine for police officers in the United Kingdom, latterly published by Jane's Information Group. The magazine was founded in 1893 as The Police Review and Parade Gossip, aiming to (in its own words) 'cultivate the self-respect of the constabulary of this country, to raise them in the esteem and regard of all their fellow citizens'. Since its foundation, the magazine was published every week without fail, celebrating the appearance of its 6000th issue on 10 October 2008.

On 18 November 2011 Police Review ceased publication in all forms. The publishing director stated: "The magazine has enjoyed a long and rewarding history, providing the UK policing community with the highest quality news, information and training packages, but unfortunately changes in the marketplace mean that period is drawing to a close."

The magazine acted as an independent forum for the sharing of opinions and a supporter of various campaigns to improve standards in policing. Issues covered by the magazine have ranged from complaints about the discomfort of regulation footwear to disputes about pay reform.
