= Police Information Technology Organisation =

Former British government agency

The Police Information Technology Organisation (PITO) was an arm's length body of the UK government. It replaced the Police Information Systems Unit (PISU) of the Home Office, which initially ran the UK government Police National Computer (PNC) project. The PNC project itself was evolved in the early 1970s, and was launched in 1974 with 'Stolen Vehicles' as its initial database.

The primary site of PISU and later PITO was the Hendon Data Centre, proximate to the Metropolitan Police Training Centre, but latterly other sites were used. PITO was subsumed into the National Policing Improvement Agency (NPIA) on 1 April 2007.
