= Rob Beckley (police officer) =

British police officer

Assistant Commissioner Robert John Beckley QPM
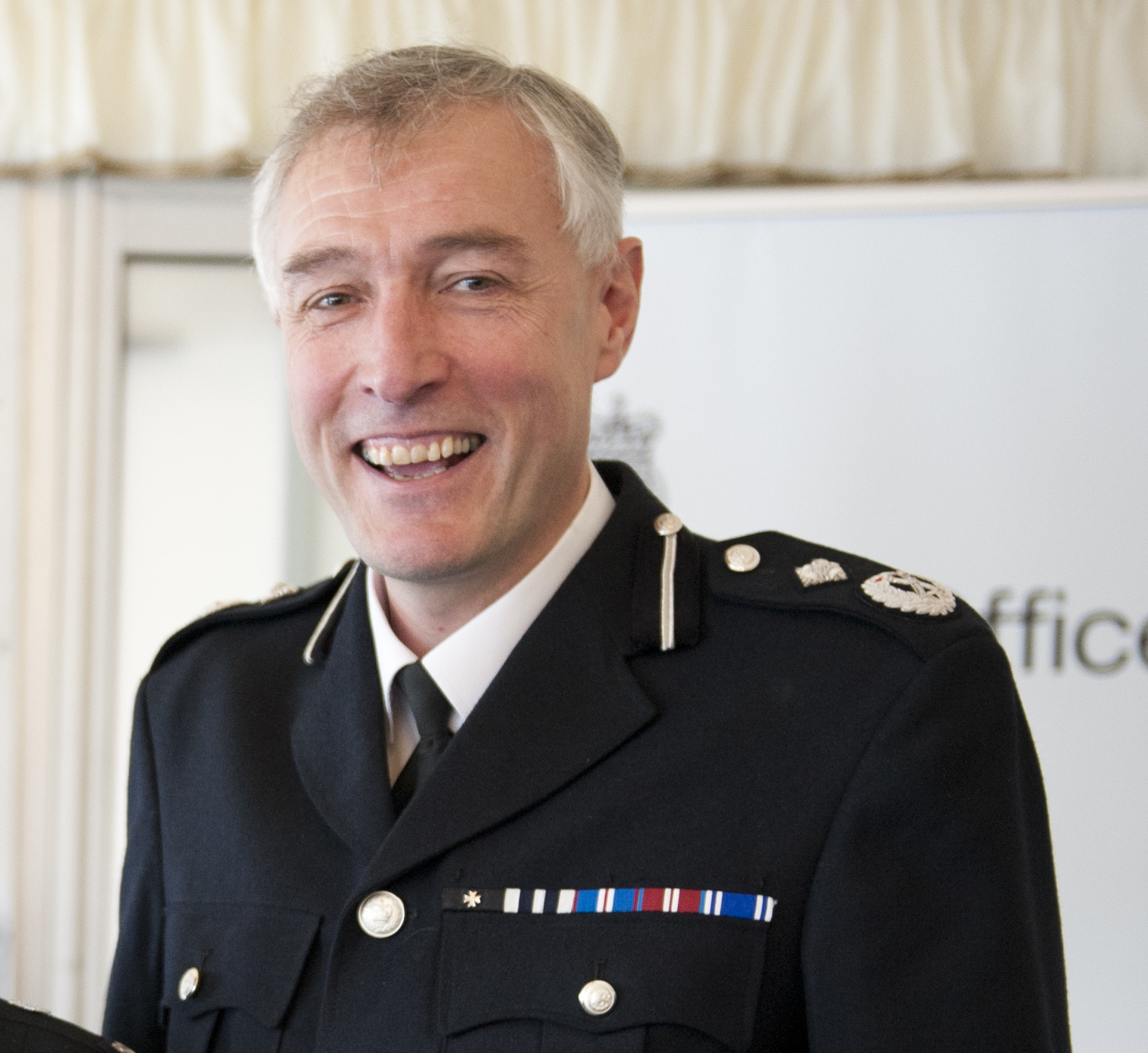
- Known for: Leading the investigation into the Hillsborough disaster
- Police career
- Country: United Kingdom
- Rank: Assistant commissioner
- Awards: Queen's Police Medal

Robert John Beckley is a British retired senior police officer, and was the High Sheriff of Somerset from 2024 to 2025. He was seconded as an assistant commissioner from the Metropolitan Police to the Home Office from November 2016 until March 2024 to head the Command Team of Operation Resolve, the investigation into the Hillsborough disaster. He was awarded the Queen's Police Medal in 2007.

== Early life ==
Beckley graduated in law from the University of Durham (University College). He spent four years working in development and education in Africa before joining the police.

== Career ==
Beckley's first police service was with the Metropolitan Police in Brixton, Southall and New Scotland Yard (1986–1997), in which he rose to the rank of chief inspector, before being promoted to chief superintendent during a subsequent spell in Thames Valley Police (1997–2002). He was then promoted to assistant chief constable just before moving to head Territorial Operations (and later Crime and Operations) in Hertfordshire Police (2002–2007). He later became deputy chief constable of Avon and Somerset Police (2007–2016).

In parallel with these posts, he also held the national portfolio for citizens in policing, and later for counter-terrorism and matters of race and faith. This was followed by time as chief operating officer of the new College of Policing from July 2013 to 2016, after which he was appointed an assistant commissioner in the Metropolitan Police alongside his appointment in Operation Resolve. In April 2018, while seconded to the Home Office, he responded to the investigation into Operation Midland by recommending a move away from police automatically believing victims to one in which victims were reassured they were being listened to.

Beckley served as High Sheriff of Somerset from March 2024 to March 2025.

He actively supports and is a trustee of a number of charities, some local to Somerset, as well as international charities such as the Bishop Tutu Foundation and Project Trust.

== Honours ==

Ribbon	Description	Notes
	Order of St John	Member; 2011
	Queen's Police Medal (QPM)	2007
	Queen Elizabeth II Golden Jubilee Medal	2002; UK version
	Queen Elizabeth II Diamond Jubilee Medal	2012; UK version
	Queen Elizabeth II Platinum Jubilee Medal	2022; UK version
	King Charles III Coronation Medal	2023; UK version
	Police Long Service and Good Conduct Medal	With 30 year service bar
