= Wilfred Dolby Fuller =

Recipient of the Victoria Cross

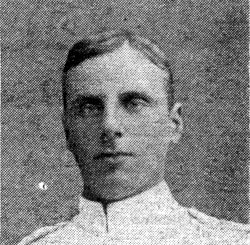
- Born: 28 July 1893; Greasley, Nottinghamshire
- Died: 22 November 1947 (aged 54); Frome, Somerset
- Burial place: Christchurch Churchyard, Frome
- Military career
- Allegiance: United Kingdom
- Branch: British Army
- Rank: Corporal
- Units: Grenadier Guards
- Conflicts: World War I
- Awards: Victoria Cross; Cross of St. George (Russia)
- Other work: Somerset Constabulary

Wilfred Dolby Fuller VC (28 July 1893 – 22 November 1947) was an English recipient of the Victoria Cross, the highest and most prestigious award for gallantry in the face of the enemy that can be awarded to British and Commonwealth forces.

Fuller was born in Greasley, Nottinghamshire. At the age of 18 (1911) he joined the 1st Battalion of the Grenadier Guards. Serving initially in a military police role at Chelsea Barracks, Wilfred, a keen sportsman volunteered for and was accepted into the battalion's 'Bomber' section. These men would advance in front of the other guards armed only with a bag of the newly invented grenades. In 1915 the battalion was deployed to France and saw action at the Battle of Neuve Chapelle. As a lance corporal Wilfred was in charge of a small section of bombers who on the second day of the battle (12 March 1915) advanced onto the German trench lines.

For most conspicuous bravery at Neuve Chapelle on 12th March, 1915. Seeing a party of the enemy endeavouring to escape along a communication trench, he ran towards them and killed the leading man with a bomb; the remainder (nearly 50) finding no means of evading his bombs, surrendered to him. Lance-Corporal Fuller was quite alone at the time.

He received his Victoria Cross from King George V at Buckingham Palace on 4 June 1915. In September of the same year, at the express wish of the Tsar of Russia, he was also decorated by the King at Sheffield with the Russian Cross of the Order of Saint George, 3rd Class.

== Post war ==
In March 1916 he married Helena May Wheeler, a nurse at the Hammersmith Hospital from Somerset. Later the same year Corporal Fuller was discharged from the Army on medical grounds and in 1919 joined the Somerset Constabulary. He served at Milverton, Ilminster, Clevedon, Nunney and finally Frome where he performed his duties from Rodden Road police station. He retired from the police service on medical grounds in 1939 and took up residence in Frome. Wilfred and Helena had two daughters. Wilfred died aged 54 in 1947 and lies buried at Christ Church, Frome, Somerset.

On 5 May 2017 Avon and Somerset Constabulary named their new operational training, horse and dog centre in Clevedon, Somerset, the 'Wilfred Fuller VC Operational training centre'. The centre was officially opened by The Princess Royal.
