= Sarah Crew =

Police officer

Chief Constable Sarah Crew QPM
- Education: Bristol Grammar School,Magdalen College, Oxford
- Employer: Avon and Somerset Police
- Known for: Chief constable of Avon and Somerset Police

Sarah Crew QPM is a British Police chief constable. She became Avon and Somerset's first woman chief constable in November 2021.

== Life ==
Crew attended Bristol Grammar School. The staff there gave her extra lessons to support her application to Oxford University to study Classics, which she completed at Magdalen College.

She joined the police in 1994 and nine years later she was a detective inspector. She became Avon and Somerset Police's first woman chief constable in November 2021, when she was promoted from the deputy position.

She worked with academics on a collaboration called Project Bluestone where they were trying to improve the police's response to victims of rape.

Crew made headlines in 2023 when she conceded that her organisation was "institutionally racist" and it unfairly discriminated against women, LGBTQ+ and those with disabilities. She clarified that this was not a label for individual officers, but for her constabulary as a whole.

Criticism followed the screening of a Channel 4 programme that looked at how the police investigated themselves in Avon and Somerset. The local police federation raised objections even though they, like Crew, had agreed to the filming, which had begun in 2019. Crew noted that it was never anticipated that interest would be so high. The TV series To Catch a Copper was first screened in January 2024 after scandals involving women's treatment by the police.

Eighty women had been killed in the UK in 2024. Jess Phillips the newly appointed Parliamentary Under-Secretary of State for Safeguarding and Violence Against Women and Girls had committed to end the "scourge of femicide" and the Guardian had announced that it intended to report every death in 2015. Crew was interviewed in January 2025, where she cautioned domestic abusers that they were being offered help but the police intended to arrest offenders.

== Honours ==

Ribbon	Description	Notes
	Queen's Police Medal (QPM)	
	Queen Elizabeth II Golden Jubilee Medal	
	Queen Elizabeth II Diamond Jubilee Medal	
	Police Long Service and Good Conduct Medal	
