= Avon and Somerset Police =

English territorial police force

Avon and Somerset Constabulary
- Badge/Crest
- Common name: Avon and Somerset Police
- Motto: Serve. Protect. Respect.

Agency overview
- Formed: 1 April 1974; 52 years ago
- Preceding agencies: Somerset and Bath Constabulary; Part of Gloucestershire Constabulary; Bristol Constabulary
- Employees: 6,098 (2020)
- Volunteers: 533 (2020)
- Annual budget: £328.5 million (2020–21)
- Legal personality: Police force

Jurisdictional structure
- Operations jurisdiction: Avon and Somerset, England
- Map of police area
- Area: 1,847 square miles (4,780 km^{2})
- Population: 1.72 million
- Legal jurisdiction: England & Wales
- Constituting instrument: Police Act 1996
- General nature: Local civilian police

Operational structure
- Overseen by: His Majesty's Inspectorate of Constabulary and Fire & Rescue Services; Independent Office for Police Conduct
- Headquarters: Portishead
- Police officers: 2,965 (2020); 299 special constables (2020)
- Police community support officers: 330 (2020)
- Police and Crime Commissioner responsible: Clare Moody
- Agency executive: Sarah Crew, Chief constable
- Divisions: 6

Facilities
- Stations: 24

Website
- www.avonandsomerset.police.uk

Avon and Somerset Police is the territorial police force responsible for law enforcement in the five unitary authority areas of Bristol, Bath and North East Somerset, North Somerset, Somerset, and South Gloucestershire, all in South West England.

As of September 2020, the force had 2,965 police officers, 299 special constables, and 330 police community support officers. The force serves 1.72 million people over an area of 1,847 square miles (4,780 km^{2}).

According to a House of Commons Library report, as of March 2023, Avon and Somerset Police had 3,330 Police Constables and 235 Special Constables.

== History ==
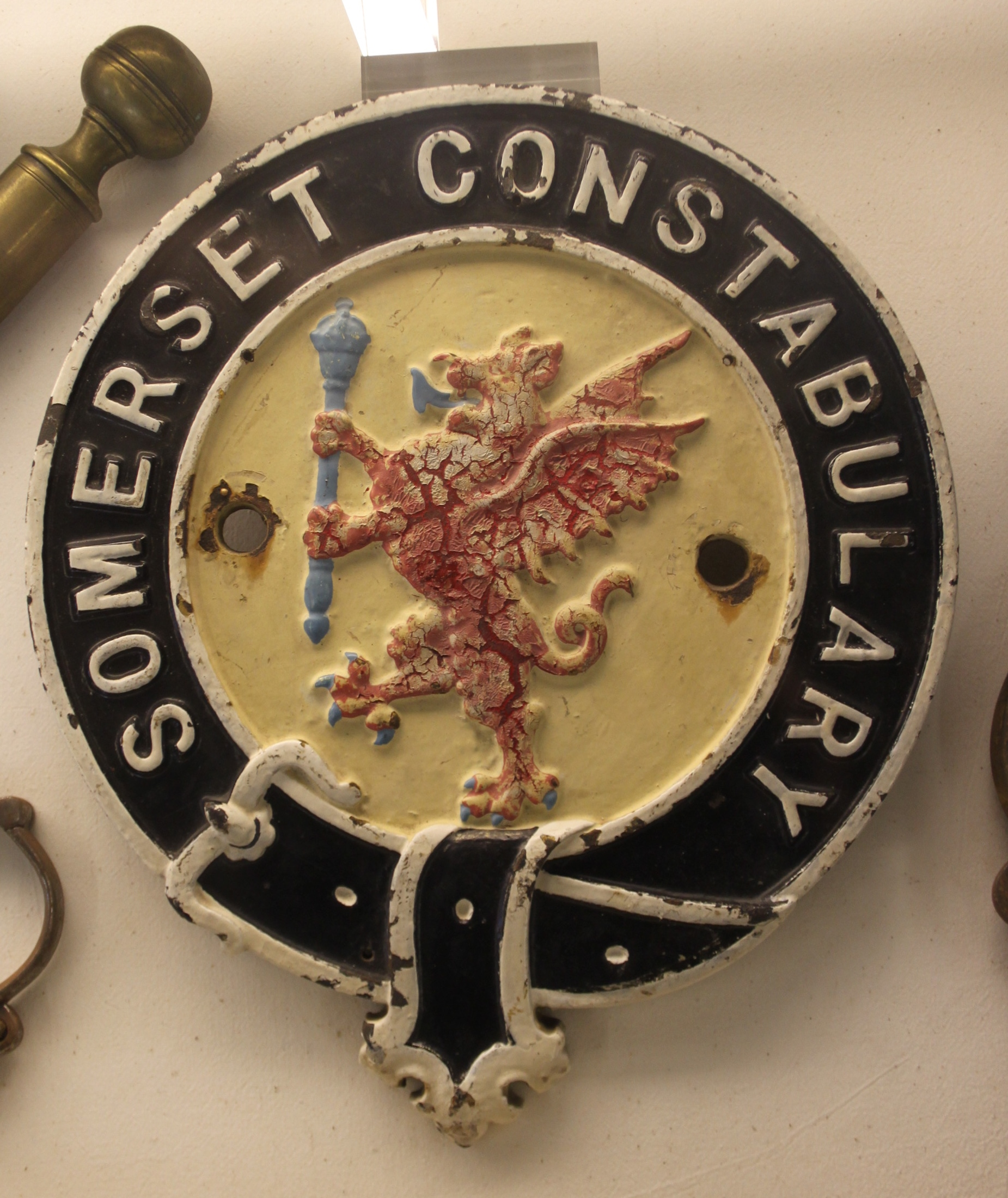
Somerset Constabulary Badge on display at King John's Hunting Lodge, Axbridge

The police area covered by Avon & Somerset Police today can trace its policing heritage back to the very start of the modern policing system. The Municipal Corporations Act 1835 created municipal boroughs across England and Wales, each with the power to create a borough police force. Before then, policing was largely unrecognisable from today's system, with watchmen and parish constables providing variable levels of law enforcement, if any, driven largely by magistrates. As a result of the Act the following borough police forces were created within the current Avon and Somerset Police area: Bath City Police (1836), Bristol Constabulary (1836), Bridgwater Borough Police (1836), Wells City Police (1836), Glastonbury Borough Police, Chard Borough Police (1839), and Yeovil Borough Police (1854).

However, outside the new boroughs there was no modern police. Therefore, the government introduced the County Police Act 1839 which permitted county authorities to set up county forces to police areas outside of the boroughs. Following these Acts, Gloucestershire Constabulary was created in 1839, which covered what is now the north part of the Avon & Somerset Constabulary area (South Gloucestershire). But there was still some opposition to the new model of policing, and rural Somerset had no police force until 1856. The County and Borough Police Act 1856 mandated county authorities to set up a constabulary. Somerset Constabulary commenced policing the county in 1856, and Wells City Police and Glastonbury Borough Police were merged into the new county force almost immediately; Yeovil Borough Police followed a year later.

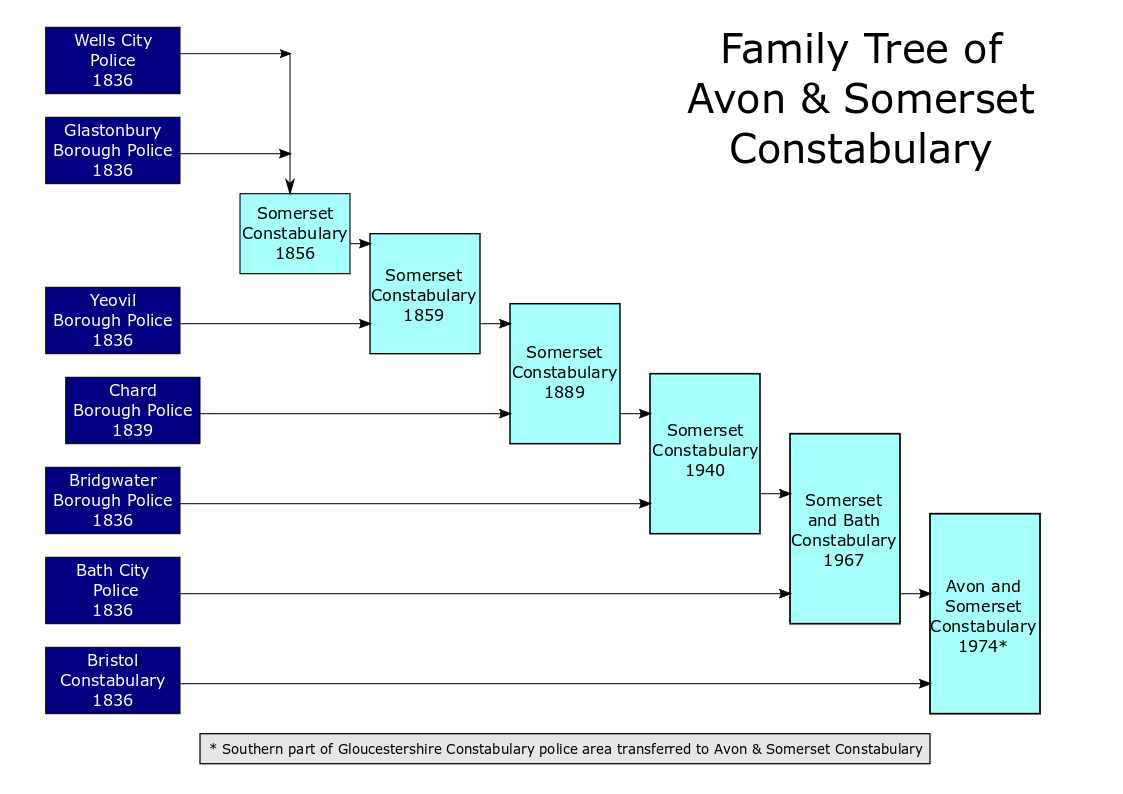
Family tree of Avon and Somerset Constabulary since 1836

Later in the 19th century the Local Government Act 1888 required that all boroughs with populations of less than 10,000 amalgamate their police force with the adjoining county constabulary. This signalled the end of Chard Borough Police, which merged into Somerset Constabulary on 1 April 1888. In 1940, Bridgwater Borough Police voluntarily became part of Somerset constabulary, with the 20 officers of the borough police becoming Somerset County officers upon merger.

During the 20th century, the number of separate police forces in the United Kingdom was reduced on grounds of efficiency. The Police Act 1964 gave the Home Secretary the power to enforce amalgamations, but this was not required when Somerset Constabulary and Bath City Police voluntarily agreed to merge forming the Somerset and Bath Constabulary on 1 January 1967. This resulted in three police forces covering the current area of the Avon & Somerset Constabulary: Somerset and Bath Constabulary, Bristol Constabulary, and Gloucestershire Constabulary (in the far north). The next change was on 1 April 1974, with the implementation the Local Government Act 1972, which created Avon and Somerset Constabulary, a merger of Somerset and Bath Constabulary, Bristol Constabulary, and the southern part of Gloucestershire Constabulary.

In 2014, the force announced that in order to reduce its budget, it would close 12 local police stations as part of a planned 36% reduction of the number of buildings it occupied. Police and Crime Commissioner Sue Mountstevens said these buildings were "outdated" and "under-occupied". The stations were seven in Bristol, and those in Bath, Keynsham, Nailsea, Radstock and Weston-super-Mare.

=== Proposed mergers ===
In 2006, the Home Office announced plans to reduce the number of police forces in the UK from 42 to 24 to try to save money. The plans were abandoned later that year due to lack of funding; but the idea has resurfaced many times. The proposal would have seen Avon and Somerset Constabulary merge with Gloucestershire Constabulary, Devon and Cornwall Police, Wiltshire Police and Dorset Police to form a "super police force". The plans were publicly criticised by all the forces involved, stating that it would lead to poor quality service and a reduction in local policing.

In February 2010, plans for a merger of the five South West police forces (Avon and Somerset; Wiltshire; Dorset; Gloucestershire; and Devon and Cornwall) were re-evaluated by the Home Office in a bid to reduce spending. All of the forces except Avon and Somerset were against an amalgamation. Following this, Avon and Somerset Constabulary began purchasing uniform and equipment without the force crest. Instead, identifying marks just read 'Police' without a force crest or reference to Avon and Somerset.

=== Chief constables ===
Colin Port served as the chief constable from January 2005. In November 2012, the police and crime commissioner (PCC) Sue Mountstevens announced that she would invite applications for the role rather than extending his contract. Port then decided not to re-apply for the position, and retired in March 2013. In January 2013, Port took the PCC to court to seek an injunction to block the interviews of candidates for the post of chief constable, but his case did not succeed.

Nick Gargan was appointed as the next chief constable in March 2013. In mid-May 2014, Gargan was suspended by the PCC following allegations of "inappropriate behaviour towards female officers and staff". The enquiry into the allegations was referred to the Independent Police Complaints Commission (IPCC). Gargan was reported by the PCC to have denied the allegations. During the first part of Gargan's suspension, the force was run by Deputy Chief Constable John Long. He stood down as acting chief constable at the end of August 2015, and was replaced by Gareth Morgan, who was serving as deputy chief constable for Long. Gargan resigned from the position in October 2015.

Morgan continued serving as acting chief constable after Gargan's resignation until the PCC appointed Andy Marsh, the former chief constable of the Hampshire Constabulary, as the new chief constable in February 2016.

In April 2021, Marsh announced that he would not be renewing his contract in July 2021. Following Marsh's departure, Deputy Chief Constable Sarah Crew took over as temporary chief constable, and was confirmed in the role on 25 November 2021.

Chief constable	Term started	Term ended
Kenneth Steele (Note: First chief constable of Avon & Somerset Constabulary upon its formation. Had been chief constable of one of the preceding forces – Somerset and Bath Constabulary from 1967, and prior to that had been chief constable of Somerset Constabulary from 1955, prior to its merger with Bath City Police.)	1 April 1974	31 August 1979
Brian Weigh	1 September 1979	1983
F.R. Broome	1983	1989
David J. Shattock	1989	1998
Stephen Pilkington	February 1998	December 2004
Colin Port	27 January 2005	December 2012
Rob Beckley (acting)	December 2012	March 2013
Nick Gargan	4 March 2013	13 May 2014 (suspended); 16 October 2015 (resigned)
John Long (acting)	13 May 2014	31 August 2015
Gareth Morgan (acting)	1 September 2015	31 January 2016
Andy Marsh	1 February 2016	1 July 2021
Sarah Crew	2 July 2021 (temporary); 25 November 2021	incumbent

=== Officers killed in the line of duty ===
The Police Roll of Honour Trust and Police Memorial Trust list and commemorate all British police officers killed in the line of duty. Since its establishment in 1984, the Police Memorial Trust has erected 50 memorials nationally to some of those officers. Officers killed include:

- Superintendent William Balkwill (Somerset Constabulary), 1900: Fatally injured while restraining a violent prisoner
- DC Reginald Charles Grady (Bristol Constabulary), 1945: Collapsed and died during a violent arrest
- PC David George Petch, 1981, aged 31: Killed when his traffic patrol car crashed following a speeding car
- PC Peter Leonard Deans and PC Jonathan Michael Stapley, 1984: During a car chase their vehicle crashed and Deans and Stapley were fatally injured
- WPC Deborah Leat, 1986: During a car chase Leat's vehicle crashed and she was fatally injured
- PC Stephen Jones, 1999: Died after being hit by a stolen vehicle he was attempting to stop

== Governance ==
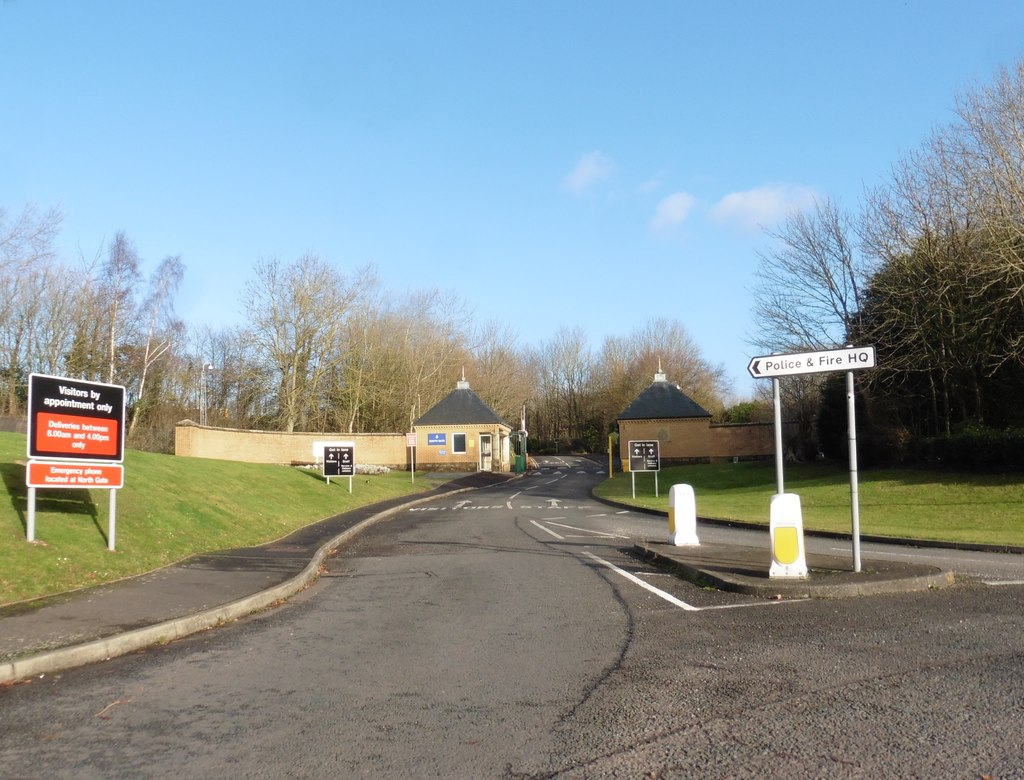
HQ, Avon and Somerset Police and Avon Fire and Rescue Service

The force is overseen by the Avon and Somerset Police and Crime Commissioner, an elected position which replaced the Avon and Somerset Police Authority in November 2012. The police and crime commissioner is scrutinised by the Avon and Somerset Police and Crime Panel, consisting of elected councillors from the police area. The first police and crime commissioner, who was elected on 15 November 2012 and took office on 21 November 2012, was Sue Mountstevens. She had previously been a magistrate and a member of the police authority, and had stood for election as an independent. Mountstevens was succeeded by Mark Shelford in May 2021. Then in May 2024, Claire Moody was elected to serve as Avon and Somerset PCC.

== Organisation ==
Avon and Somerset headquarters, which it has shared with Avon Fire and Rescue Service since 2017, is in Portishead in North Somerset, close to the B3124. The site was chosen when the Bristol Constabulary's Bridewell Headquarters was deemed to be too small. The Portishead complex cost £31 million to construct and was opened by Queen Elizabeth II on 2 June 1995.

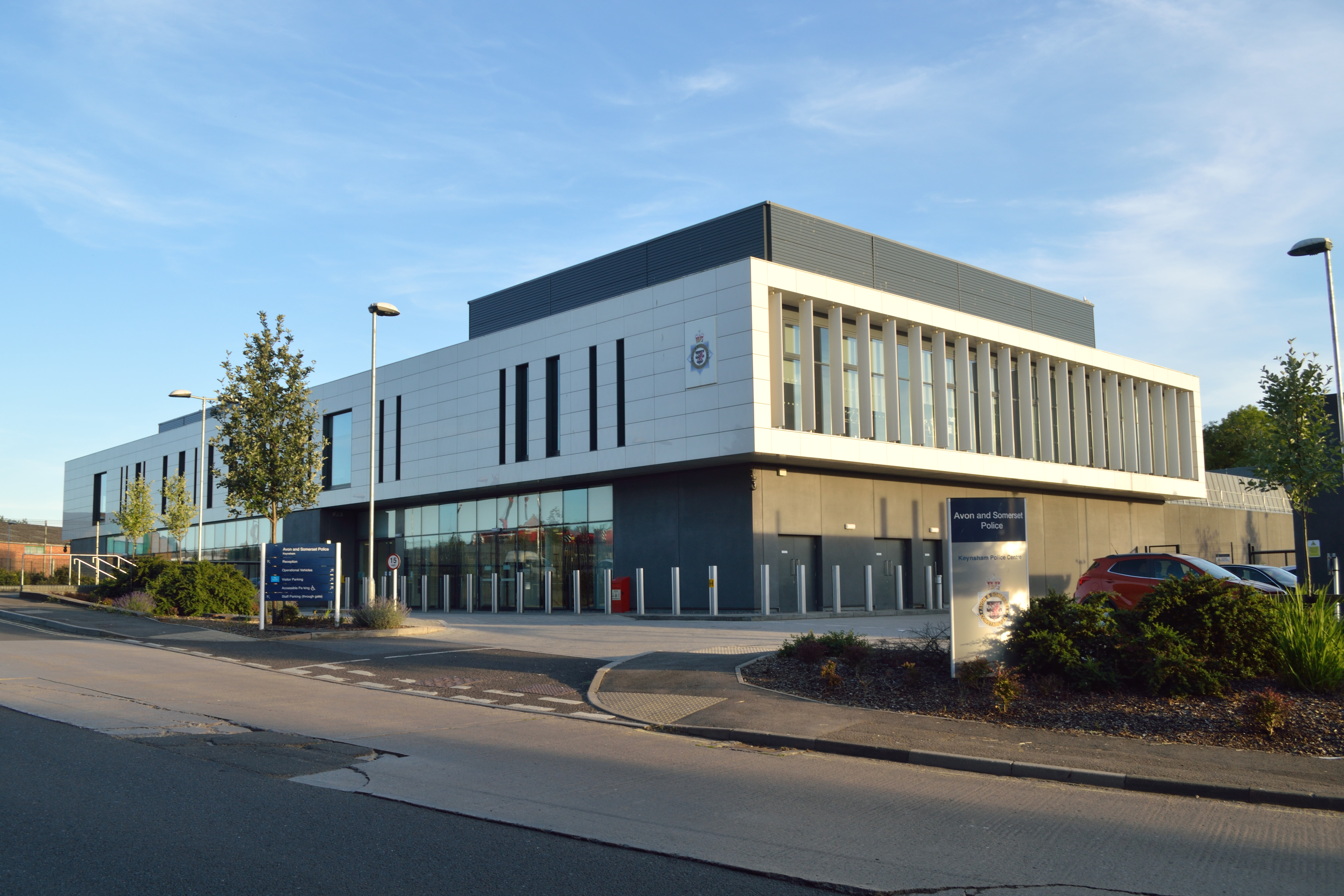
The new Keynsham Police Centre on the outskirts of the town near the by-pass road

In 2014, the force moved into three new police and custody centres in Bridgwater, Patchway and Keynsham. At that time it announced that a third of its other premises would be closed by 2019.

In 2017, Avon and Somerset moved away from a geographically based policing model to a directorate based one. This change is slowly being reversed and as of 2024, the force has moved patrol and neighbourhood functions back into three Basic Command Units, namely, North East, Bristol and Somerset. The current Basic Command Units cover

- North East - South Gloucestershire and BaNES (Bath and North East Somerset) council areas
- Bristol - Bristol city council area
- Somerset - North Somerset, Somerset Council (Sedgemoor, West Somerset, Taunton Deane, South Somerset and Mendip).

The current directorates are:

- Investigations and Operations Support (including Complex investigations, Criminal Justice and Intelligence)
- Southwest regional Collaborations (Regional Organised Crime Unit (ROCU), Counter terrorism unit, Forensics)

=== Basic Command Unit structure ===
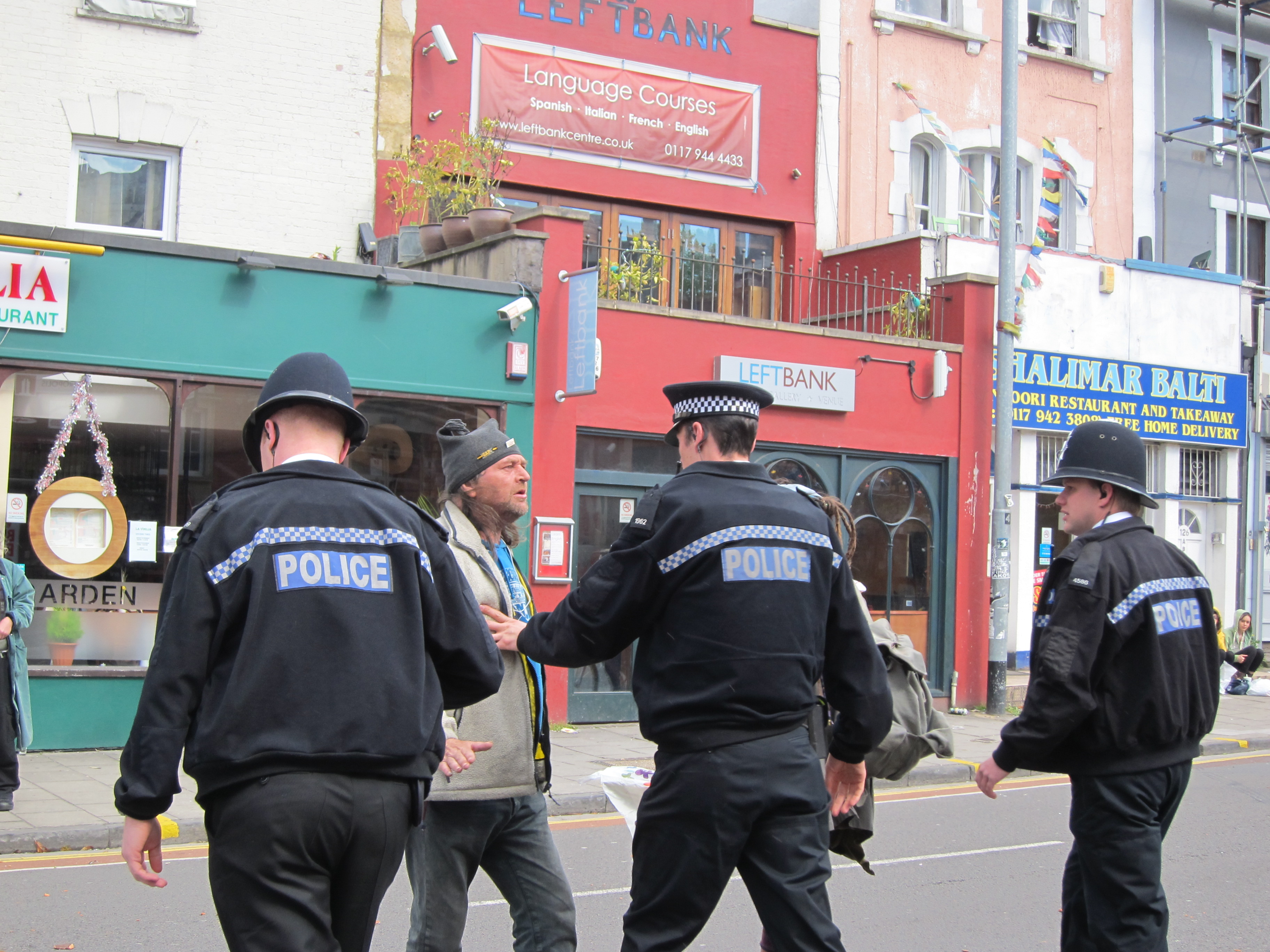
Avon and Somerset Constabulary police constables, Bristol, 2010

Each Basic Command Unit (BCU) has several specialist teams, namely:

- Neighbourhood Policing Teams, each with local beat managers and police community support officers. The teams concentrate on preventing and detecting local crime and targeting offenders, building contacts in the local community, resolving problems by working with local organisations and individuals and being visible and accessible.
- Neighbourhood Tasking Teams (NTT), each with police officers who conduct high visibility proactive patrols within their communities targeting drugs and inquisitive crime.
- Patrol and Response policing Teams responding to emergency calls.
- Traffic units patrol the roads and target and pursue people committing traffic offences, this includes Traffic Police Community Support Officers.
- Criminal Investigation Departments detect serious crime
  - Forensic Services investigate crime scenes for forensic evidence that may correspond with many of the Home Office databases.
- Pro-active policing units target persistent criminals and focus on specific operations.
- Dog Units are officers who patrol with dogs and respond to incidents where a police dog is required.

=== Headquarters-based teams ===
To support the BCUs, several centralised teams operate from the Portishead headquarters:

- Senior Management
- Criminal Investigation Department
- Major Incident Planning
- Major Investigation Team
- Armed Response Group
- Counter Terrorism Group
- Emergency Communications Centre
- Force Contact Centre (SNEN)
- Intelligence
- Corporate communications

=== Rank Structure ===
Avon and Somerset Police uses the standard rank structure.

Great Britain police ranks and insignia
Rank	Chief constable	Deputy chief constable	Assistant chief constable	Chief superintendent	Superintendent	Chief inspector	Inspector	Sergeant	Constable
Epaulette insignia									

=== Special Constabulary ===
Avon and Somerset Police have a large and active Special Constabulary. Members are warranted (attested) constables, who serve unpaid in various areas of the Force.

"Specials" as they are known, work in the following teams:

- Response Teams (RT)
- Neighborhood Policing Teams (NPT)
- Roads Policing Unit (RPU) (Traffic)
- Attachment to CID

The head is Special Chief Officer Andy Bennett.

The rank structure is as follows:

Rank Name	Insignia	Abbreviation of rank
Special Chief Officer		CO
Special Chief Inspector		SCI
Special Inspector		S/Insp
Special Sergeant		S/Sgt
Special Constable		SC

Avon and Somerset generally do not wear "SC" on their operational uniform rank slides, but all Specials collar numbers start with the digit "5".

=== Cadets ===
The force's cadets engage at public events, community engagements and meetings with their unit. There are three cadet units – Bristol, South Gloucestershire, and Weston-super-mare.

Police Cadets are young people and are not considered Police Staff or warranted constables.

== Operations ==
=== National Police Air Service ===
The National Police Air Service (NPAS) is responsible for providing air support to all the police forces of England and Wales. NPAS has a base within the force area adjacent to the Almondsbury M4/M5 Interchange. The helicopter serves all police forces within flying distance.

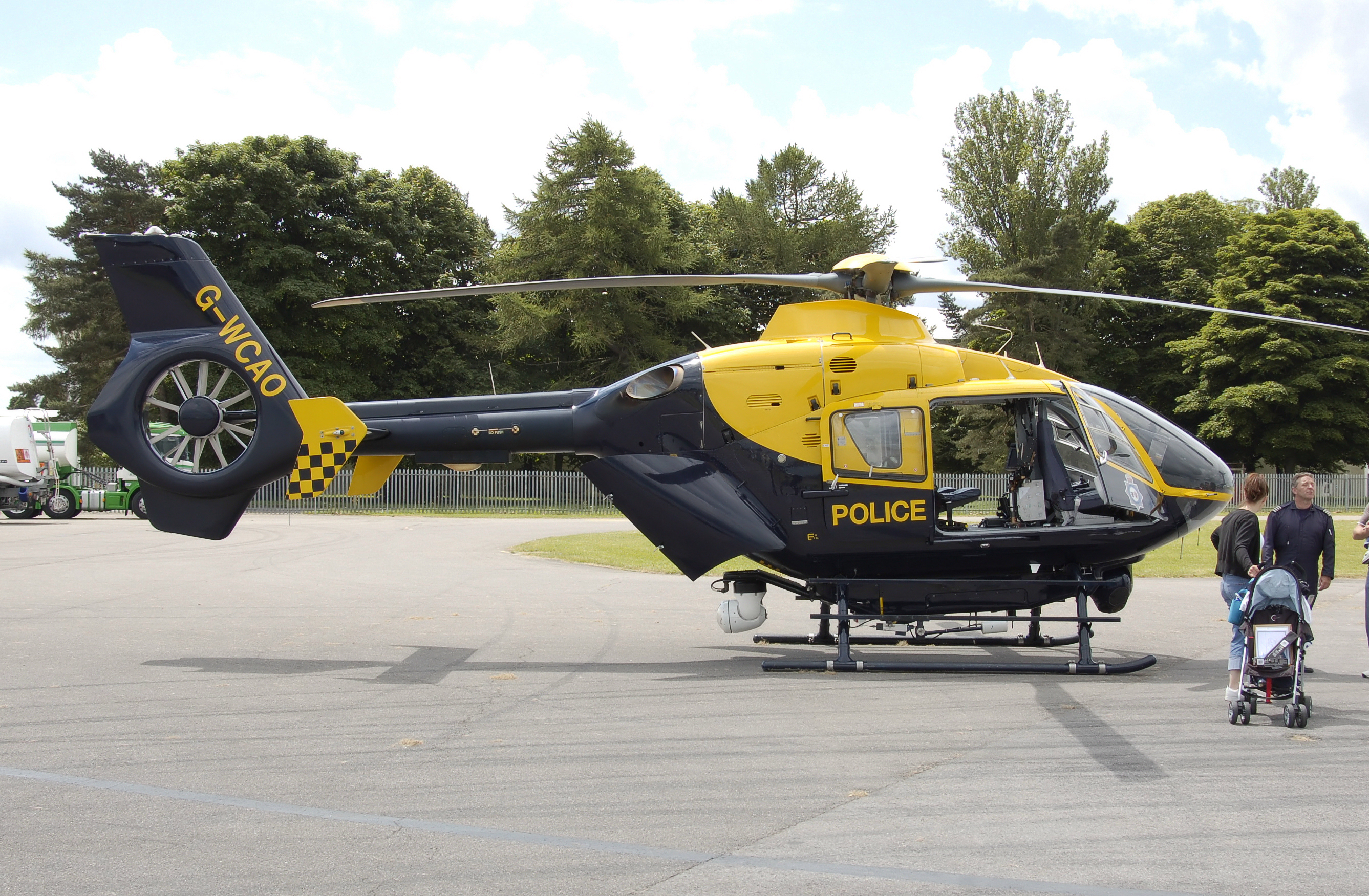
West Counties EC135 Helicopter, 2008

=== Road Policing Unit ===
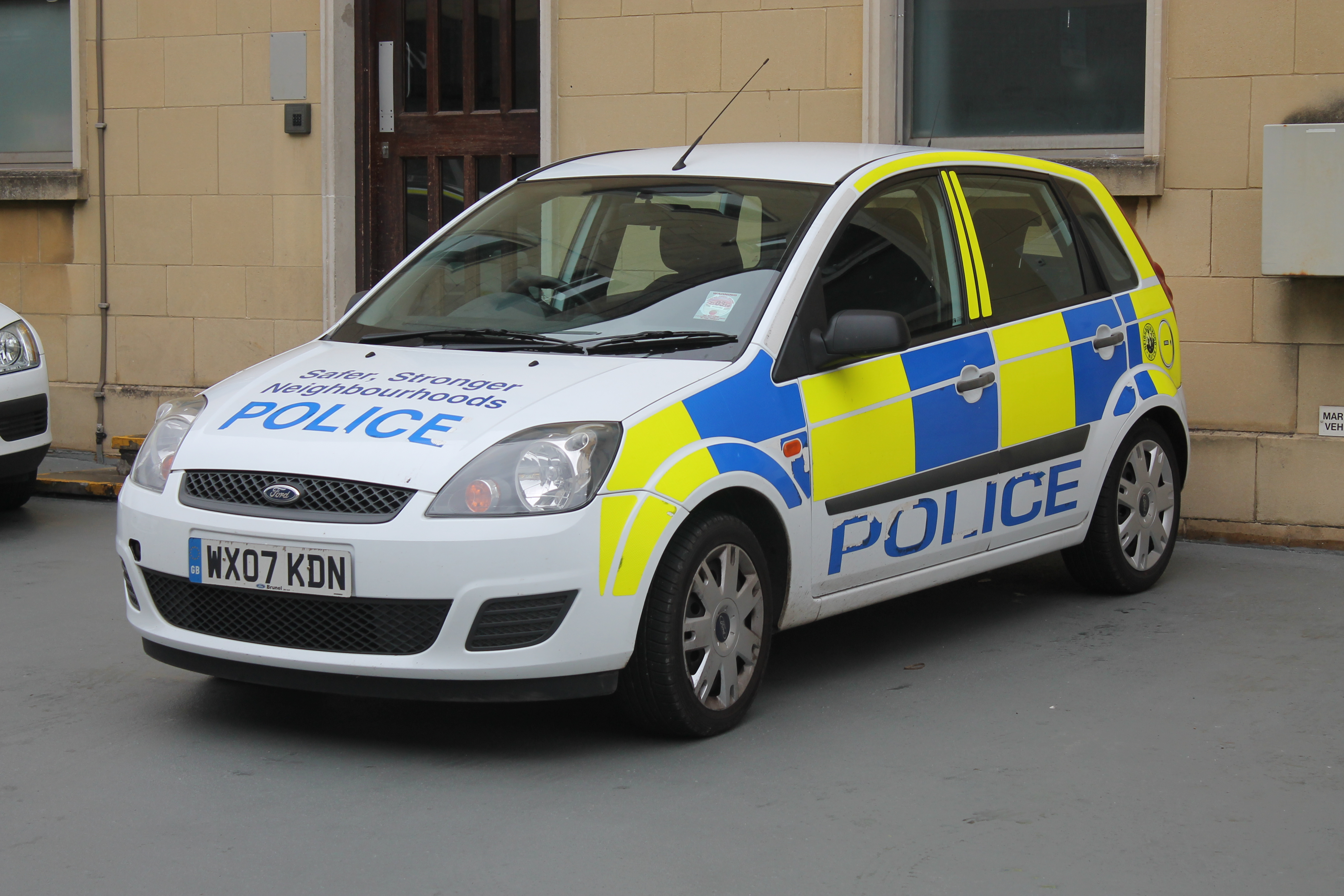
Neighbourhood Policing Team Ford Fiesta, Bath

In 2011 the RPU had 55 cars and 28 motorcycles. The unit has two bases: Almondsbury and Express Park, Bridgwater.

=== Support Group Unit ===
Avon and Somerset Police has a Support Group that specialise in specific needs of investigations or missions, such as police divers, football match management and explosive searching. The officers chosen for Support Group duties are physically elite and have passed extensive tests.

=== Mounted Division Unit ===
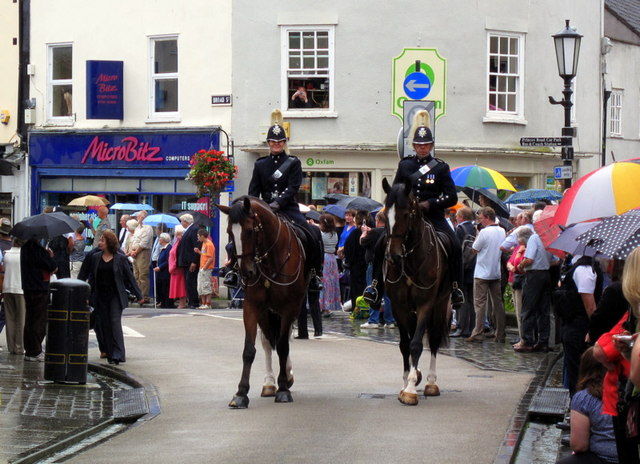
Mounted Police in Wells High Street

Although considered a luxury in other forces, Avon and Somerset Police has a division of mounted police due to the many events that attract large crowds in the area such as Badminton Horse Trials, Glastonbury Festival and Bristol City Football Club. The unit consists of 12 bred bay geldings. The unit is occasionally loaned to neighbouring forces as Avon and Somerset and Gloucestershire are the only West Country police forces with a mounted division.

=== Former tri-force collaboration ===
From 2013 to 2019, specialist teams – roads, firearms and police dogs – operated in collaboration with the Gloucestershire and Wiltshire forces.

== Presentation ==
=== Headgear ===
Male police officers and Special Constables (up to and including the rank of Police Sergeant) on foot patrol wear the traditional custodian helmet, in the rose style, with a Brunswick star that reads 'Avon and Somerset Constabulary'.

A black peaked cap with the black-and-white tartan capband is worn on mobile patrol in vehicles and for certain occasions (such as driving checekpoints) and a white peaked cap for traffic officers.

Female police officers (including Special Constables) have the option of a black bowler hat, or black peaked cap, or a white bowler hat for traffic officers.

Male PCSOs wear a black peaked cap, with a blue solid capband and Force capbadge, with female PCSOs having the option of wearing that, or a bowler cap in the same style.

During inclement weather, police officers (including Special Constables) may wear a black beanie (warm) hat with "POLICE" written on the front part. PCSOs may wear a bright blue beanie (warm) hat with "PCSO" on the front. Neither have the Force capbadge.

Police Constables and Special Constables of the rank of Inspector and Chief Inspector and Special Inspector and Special Chief Inspector respectively, wear peaked, or bowler, caps with raised black band on the brim of the cap and under the capbadge on the bowler.

For Superintendent and Chief Superintendent ranks, the raised band becomes silver and for very senior officers, oak leaves are worn on both the outer and inner edges of their peaks, or, a double row beneath the capbadge for female officers.

==== Specialist Headgear ====
Some specialist headgear exists for officers (both regular and Specials) in specialist capabilities. For example, Firearms officers and Dog Unit officers may wear a black baseball cap, for both male and female members.

For officers on Public Order duties, a foldable baseball cap with "POLICE on the front, is worn, in lieu of when the 'NATO' helmet is not being used.

=== Uniform ===
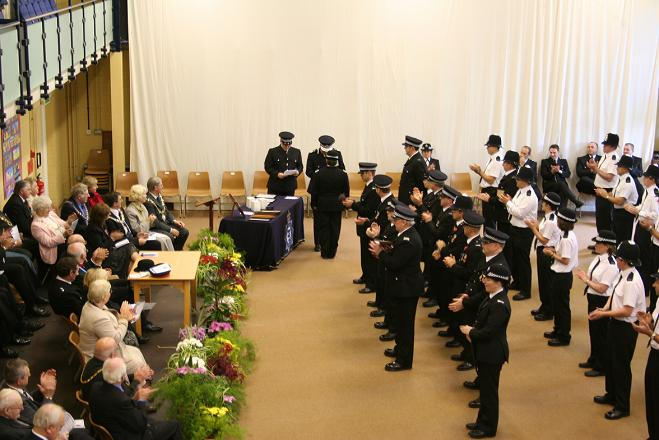
Special Constables and regular officers of Avon and Somerset Police at the 125th anniversary of the Special Constabulary in Taunton.

When on duty, officers wear the black wicking shirt, covered with a black stab vest reading 'Police' on the front and back. Avon and Somerset no longer use the traditional NATO police jumper, having favoured the black jacket with 'Police' written on the chest and back. Avon and Somerset officers do not have Brunswick stars on their epaulettes, just the rank and/or collar number. Officers have a choice of a black (unmarked) fleece, a black inner jacket and a black waterproof coat. There is also a high-visibility bomber jacket, coat and tabbard.

Formal dress comprises an open-necked tunic, white shirt/blouse and tie. Female officers do not wear the black and white chequered cravat. Constables and Sergeants wear custodian helmets and collar numbers on their epaulettes, while higher-ranked officers wear peaked caps, name badges and their rank on their epaulettes. The No.1 uniform is accompanied by black boots or shoes and occasionally black gloves, or brown gloves for the rank of Inspector and above.

=== Equipment ===
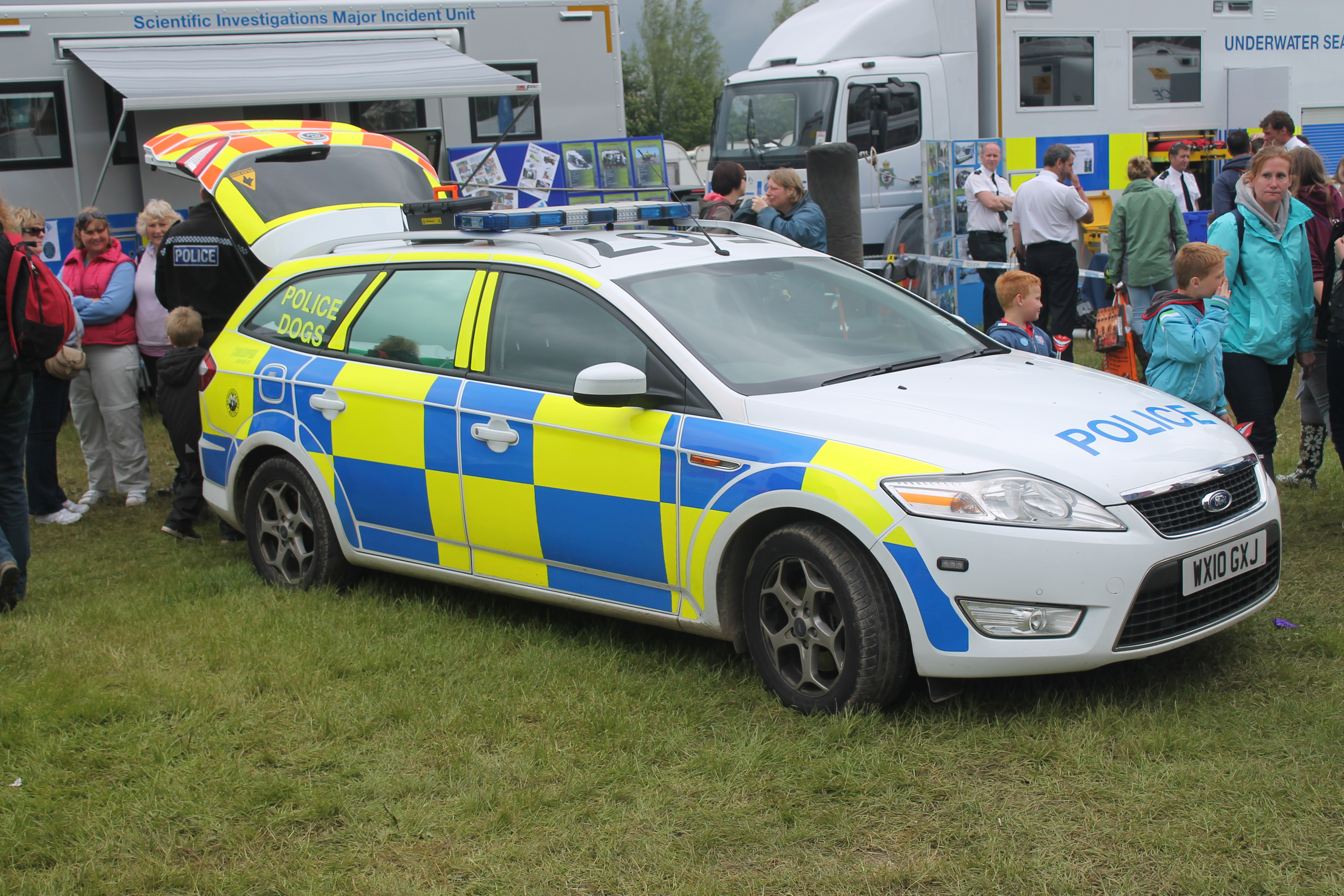
A Police Dog vehicle pictured in 2013

Avon and Somerset Police use a variety of standard UK police equipment including TETRA digital radios, rigid handcuffs, PAVA spray and the ASP collapsible baton. Some officers also routinely carry the TASER Stun device designed to electrically shock a subject making them fall to the ground and to be subdued.

During late 2009 Avon and Somerset Police introduced mobile data terminals and Personal Digital Assistants (PDA) to some of its operational vehicles and front line officers. This is steadily being rolled out across the force. Most front line officers now have their own PDA designed to assist the officer in his/her day to day tasks and allows them to spend more time out of the station.

=== Livery ===
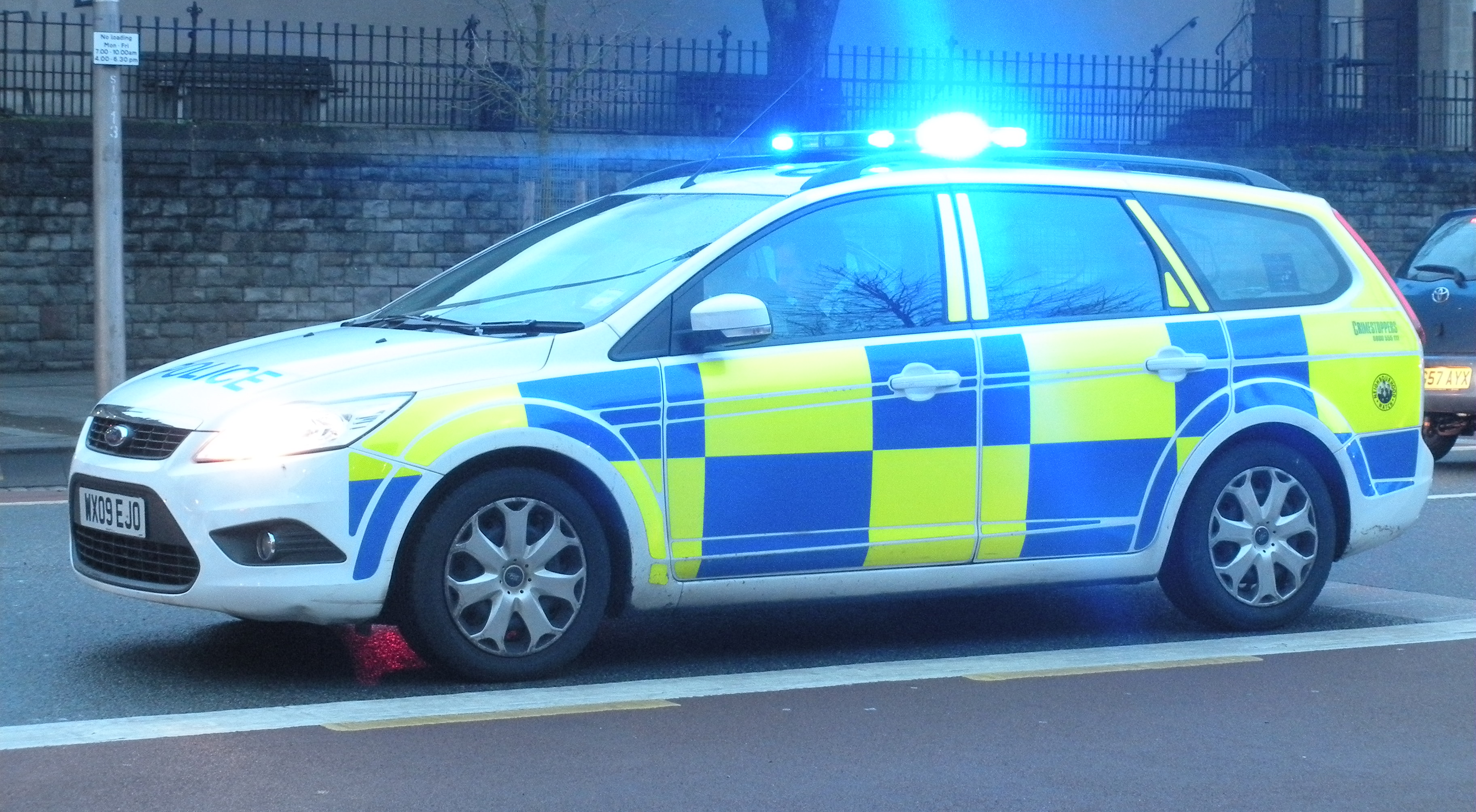
A Ford Focus police vehicle belonging to the force, 2012

Avon and Somerset Police uses the modern blue and yellow retro-reflective square Battenburg markings on all of its operational vehicles. This style of livery was introduced in 2005, when the traditional 'jam sandwich' style police markings were removed in favour of the new livery, thought to aid officers responding to emergency calls by allowing the public to quickly and clearly identify the vehicle as belonging to the police. The square livery also aids in the visibility of the force, which is perceived to enhance public confidence. Marked vehicles also show the force's Internet address on the rear and the word 'POLICE' across the bonnet. However, the force's crest is no longer used on most vehicles.

== Strength and recruitment ==
As of September 2020, the force had 2,965 police officers, 299 special constables, and 330 police community support officers, 234 police support volunteers (PSV), and 2,803 staff.

A 2017 report by Avon and Somerset Police said the force was at a "tipping point" due to financial pressure and increasing workload, and said the region faced complex threats from Islamism, from right-wing extremists trying to incite anti-Muslim hatred, and from left-wing extremists. The report stated "We cannot sustain further funding cuts without extremely serious consequences." The report expressed concern over management of offenders, and increasing demands due to people with mental health problems. In May 2017, 1,926 registered sexual offenders were in the region and he force managed over 11,000 offenders. Nearly 2,000 "high risk" people, including domestic abusers, violent offenders, sexual offenders, robbers and burglars were not under formal management. Andy Marsh, then chief constable, said "Our continuing ability to safeguard communities, protect the vulnerable, and manage major incidents of this kind is being severely tested. It's simply not sustainable. There are serious choices to be made."

== Performance ==
=== Complaints ===
For the year of 2007/8, the Independent Police Complaints Commission received 800 complaint cases, an increase of 18% from 2006/7, compared to a 0% increase nationally; from this number, 1,231 allegations were made, including 'Other neglect or failure in duty' and 'Incivility, Impoliteness and Intolerance', both at 6% and 3% respectively lower than the national average. Avon and Somerset Police was second-lowest in its peer group of seven other forces.

Of the 1,231 allegations made, 40% were investigated - 8% higher than the national average - 41% were resolved locally, and 19% were withdrawn, dispensed with or discontinued. Of the 40% investigated, 12% were substantiated and 88% were unsubstantiated.

=== British Crime Survey ===
The British Crime Survey reported that 124,89 crimes were recorded in Avon and Somerset during 2009/10. Nationally recorded crime fell by 9% during this time, including a 22% fall in car crime, a 19% fall in fraud, a 13% fall for robbery and criminal damage. Assault and sex crimes rose by 1%, and 'Other Crimes', including public order offences, dangerous driving, possession of firearms, going equipped for stealing, and perverting the course of justice, rose by 26%.

In perceptions of police and crime, 65.2% of residents in Avon and Somerset believed that Avon and Somerset Constabulary was dealing with 'anti-social behaviour and crime that matters' in their area.

=== Official inspections ===
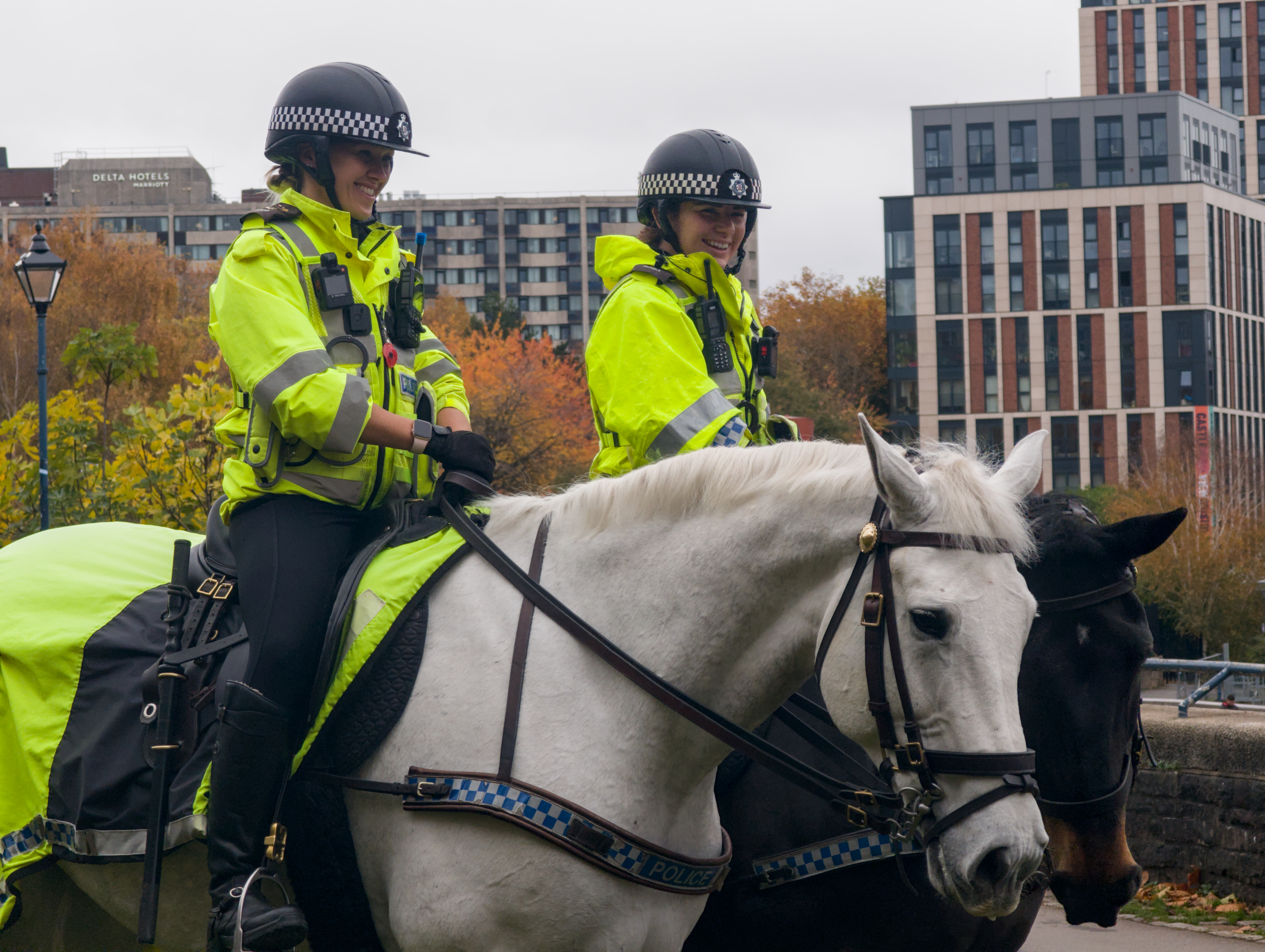
Mounted Police Unit in Castle Park, Bristol

For the year of 2009/10, His Majesty's Inspectorate of Constabulary (HMICFRS) rated Avon and Somerset as 'Fair' in all categories, including 'Local Crime', 'Protection from harm' and 'Satisfaction and Confidence'. It was recorded as 'Good' in 'Reducing road death and injury', and 'Poor' in 'Comparative satisfaction of BME [black and minority ethnic] community'. In value for money, the force received 'Medium/High' status.

HMICFRS conducts a periodic police effectiveness, efficiency and legitimacy (PEEL) inspection of each police service's performance. In its latest PEEL inspection, Avon and Somerset Police was rated as follows:

	Outstanding	Good	Adequate	Requires Improvement	Inadequate
2021/22 rating	Treatment of the public	Developing a positive workplace; Good use of resources	Preventing crime; Protecting vulnerable people	Investigating crime; Recording data about crime; Responding to the public; Managing offenders	

== Controversy ==
=== Race and sex discrimination in recruitment ===
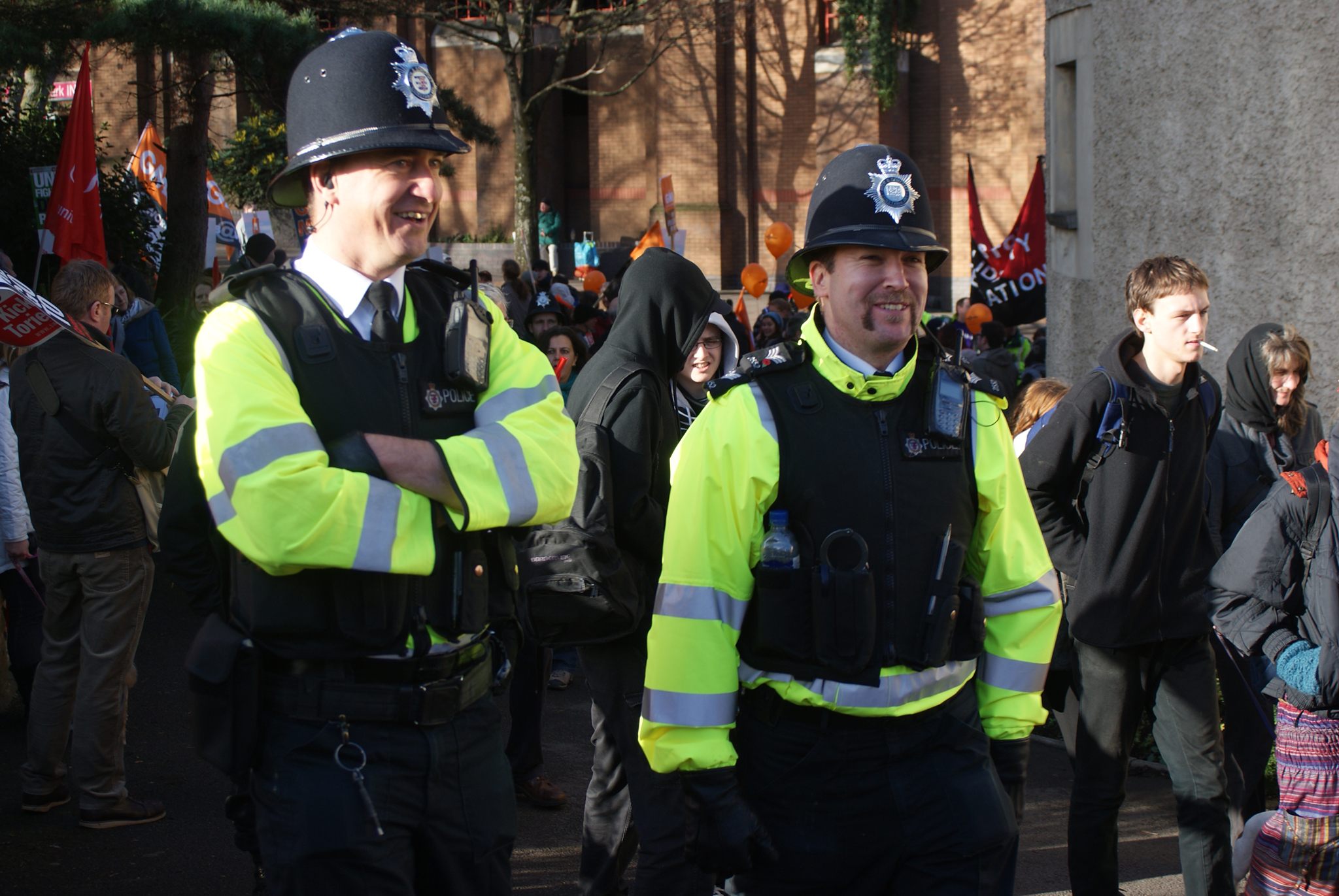
Police officers at a public sector pensions protest in Bristol in November 2011

In 2006, the force admitted it had contravened the Sex Discrimination Act and Race Relations Act when it deselected 186 white male candidates from its recruitment process solely because of their sex and race. Ralph Welsman, one of those discriminated against, sued the force for their breach of employment laws and he received compensation in an out of court settlement. The policy was condemned by both the Police Federation and Commission for Racial Equality and it was abandoned. The same illegal policy was also used by Gloucestershire Constabulary.

=== Taser usage ===
In August 2015, officers from the Avon and Somerset force used a Taser on a disabled man, who had the mental age of a seven year old. The man was charged with assaulting an officer, but the case collapsed after defence lawyers provided CCTV of the alleged assault to prosecutors. The police watchdog said that the actions of the officer who failed to gather the CCTV evidence "fell below the standard expected", but concluded there was no wrongdoing. Campaigners and local politicians argued that the case represented "another incident of excessive and unnecessary" use of the weapon in Bristol. In response to the case, the force appointed a "dedicated lead for autism" and committed to ensuring that all new officers and civilian investigators undergo training covering "autism spectrum conditions and other non-visible disabilities".

In January 2017, the force referred itself to the Independent Police Complaints Commission following an incident when officers used a Taser on a black community activist who was trying to enter his own home. They mistook him for a wanted person as he persistently refused to give his name to the officers despite requests to do so. The incident was captured on video by a member of the public and by the officers' own body cameras. In the subsequent criminal trial of the officer involved, they were acquitted of the allegation of assault and battery (assault by beating) at a trial at Salisbury Magistrates Court. The officer was also later cleared of misconduct by an independent disciplinary panel.

=== Death of James Herbert ===
The force was criticised over the death in 2010 of James Herbert, who died aged 25 in police care. Herbert, who had mental health issues, was restrained and left wearing a winter coat alone in a hot police van during a 45-minute drive on a hot summer evening. At the police station, Herbert was unresponsive and was put naked into a police cell instead of being taken to hospital. Herbert went into cardiac arrest, and subsequently died. Deborah Coles of the charity Inquest said, "James was detained by the police for his safety. He should have been treated as a patient in need of medical care. Instead, he suffered a traumatic but entirely preventable death involving prolonged and brutal restraint." The police did not get mental health support for Herbert. In 2017 it was reported that Avon and Somerset police had improved their procedures since the Herbert incident, while other police forces continued with previous practice.

=== Bristol protests ===
In March 2021, a demonstration against the Police, Crime, Sentencing and Courts Bill splintered, and a group of protestors headed toward Bridewell Police Station in Bristol city centre. The crowd began to attack police officers and the station, where the windows were broken and entry was attempted. Police repelled the mob, but there was further damage to police vehicles, including two vehicles destroyed by fire. This included a male who attempted to set a police van on fire whilst officers were inside the van.

Two further protests the following week were dispersed by police as they were all in contravention of Coronavirus legislation and the crowd refused to move on. The police received support from political leaders across the spectrum, and a member of the public donated a gift to the police in recognition of their work. Other members of the public condemned the violence used by the police against protestors, and the alleged lies told and repeated by the force Twitter account and the Chief Constable, Andy Marsh, regarding non-existent injuries to police officers.

== In media ==
From January 2024, Channel 4 broadcast a documentary series To Catch a Copper, showing the work of the force's professional standards department. Production company Story Films filmed for four years and covered issues of race, mental health and sexual misconduct in policing. Sarah Crew, chief constable since 2021, said parts of the series had been "uncomfortable" to watch. Incidents in the programme raise questions about use of force and racial profiling. In one case, a constable is fired after publishing revenge porn; in another, an officer is acquitted after having sex on duty with an intoxicated woman.

Crew, with the support of Police and Crime Commissioner Mark Shelford, permitted the programme maker behind-the-scenes access at the police Counter-Corruption Unit. Some members of the Avon and Somerset Police Federation said they felt "utterly betrayed" and "unsupported" by this decision and the resultant program.

== See also ==
- List of law enforcement agencies in the United Kingdom, Crown Dependencies and British Overseas Territories
- Law enforcement in the United Kingdom
- Port of Bristol Police
- reportMyloss.com
