= ReportMyloss.com =

reportMyloss.com
- Available in: English
- Owner: Recipero
- Website: reportmyloss.com
- Commercial: Yes
- Registration: None
- Launched: April 7, 2008; 18 years ago
- Current status: Online

reportMyloss.com is a website for the reporting of lost property by the general public in the United Kingdom. It was launched in April 2008 and is endorsed by the Avon and Somerset Constabulary, with which the information is shared.

== History ==
The site was launched with the intention of freeing police time for concentration on other important issues. It was created by Recipero, a privately held company which receives a monthly sum of undisclosed amount.

== Main features ==
The website allows users to enter descriptions and upload photographs of their lost items. Information about registered items is transferred by the service to selected police information technology systems. If items are recovered by the police, they can be reunited with their owners by using the information retrieved from the database.

== Reception ==
A 2009 Institute for Public Policy Research report entitled Arrested Development: Unlocking change in the police service points to social media and intermediary sites such as reportMyloss as ways of easing the collection of community intelligence by the police. Retailers in Weston-super-Mare were to be visited before Christmas 2010 to encourage people to use the service.
