= Wells City Police =

- Common name: Wells City Police

Agency overview
- Formed: 1 February 1836
- Dissolved: 14 October 1856
- Superseding agency: Somerset Constabulary
- Employees: 4 (as of 1851)
- Annual budget: £119, 8 shillings and 8 pence (annual, as of 1851)

Jurisdictional structure
- Operations jurisdiction: Somerset, England, United Kingdom
- Legal jurisdiction: City of Wells

Operational structure
- Headquarters: Wells

Wells City Police was the police force responsible for policing the city of Wells in England between 1836 and 1856.

Wells was one of the original 178 boroughs named in the Municipal Corporations Act 1835 which required boroughs to appoint a watch committee with a duty to appoint sufficient numbers of constables. As a result, Wells City Police came into existence on 1 February 1836 with four constables to patrol the city. A government report in 1851 outlined that the force still only had four constables to police the city at an annual cost of £119, 8 shillings and 8 pence.

The county in which Wells is situated, Somerset, had no modern police force until 1 September 1856 when Somerset Constabulary was formed. Wells City Police was consolidated into the new Somerset Constabulary within a matter of weeks on 14 October 1856.

Today, Wells is policed by the successor of Somerset Constabulary, Avon and Somerset Constabulary.

== See also ==
- List of defunct law enforcement agencies in the United Kingdom
