= To Catch a Copper =

2024 British documentary

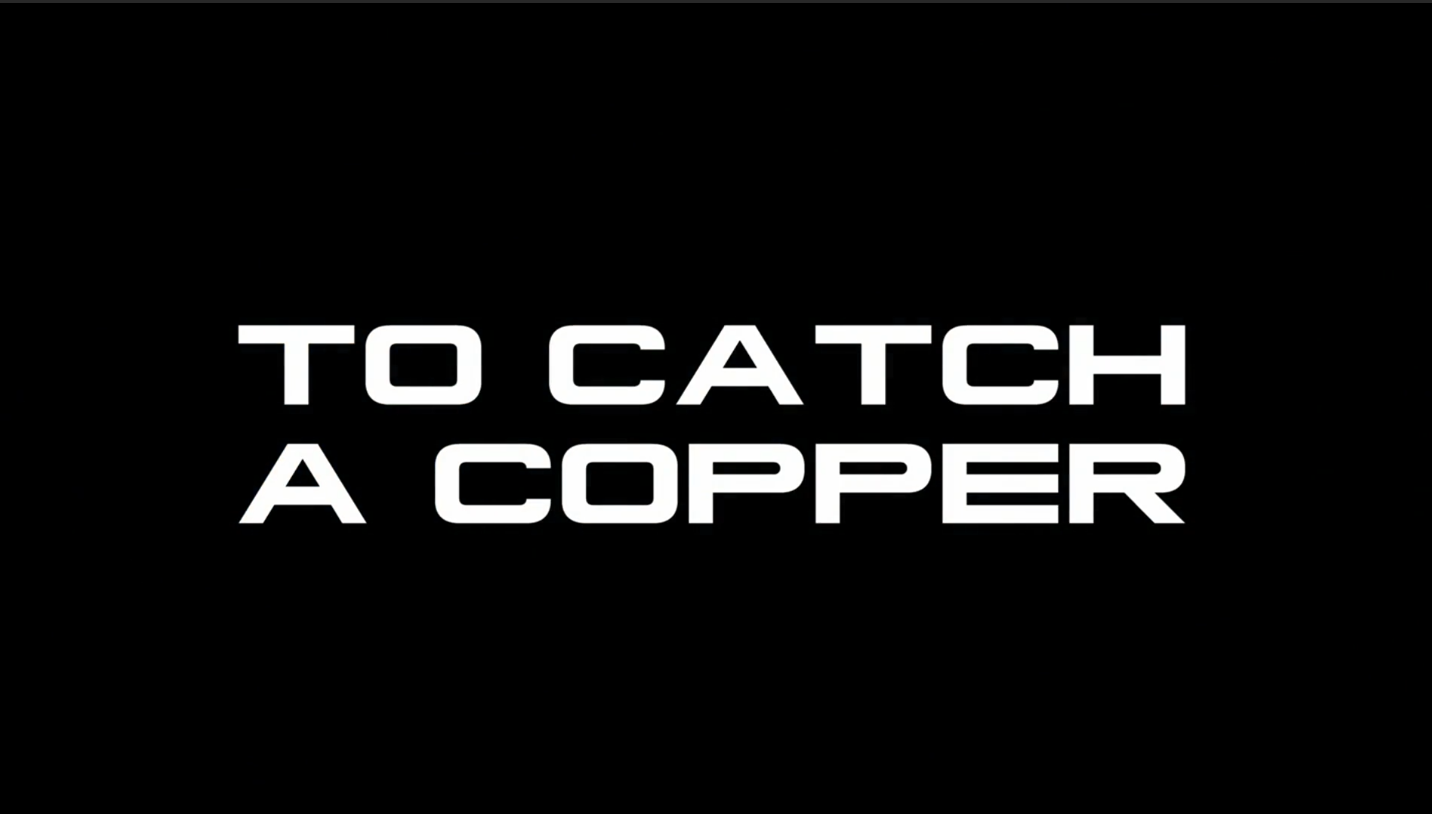
- Title card
- Genre: Documentary
- Directed by: Ashley Francis-Roy
- Narrated by: Isabelle Farah
- Country of origin: United Kingdom
- Original language: English
- No. of series: 1
- No. of episodes: 3

Production
- Producer: Hugo Pettitt
- Running time: 45 minutes
- Production company: Story Films

Original release
- Network: Channel 4
- Release: 29 January – 12 February 2024

To Catch a Copper is a 2024 British documentary series about investigations into officer misconduct within the Avon and Somerset Police. The series has three episodes, which are themed around mental health, race, and sex crimes. Concerns include use of force and racial profiling. In one case, a constable is fired after publishing revenge porn; in another, an officer is acquitted after having sex on duty with an intoxicated woman.

The series aired on Channel 4 after four years of filming in collaboration with the Counter-Corruption Unit, who received complaints and sometimes referred them to the Independent Office for Police Conduct (IOPC). The filmmakers intended to make a non-fiction programme in the style of the fictional police procedural Line of Duty, but came to the conclusion that there were systemic issues in the police misconduct process. They also heard that many incidents went unreported due to mistrust in the system.

After its release, the Police Federation surveyed local officers and found that most opposed Chief Constable Sarah Crew's co-operation with the documentary, which she believed would increase public trust in policing. Reviewers believed that the documentary raised concerns over policing. External criticisms include the CEO of the sexual abuse charity SARSAS, who said specialist training was needed, and the Independent Scrutiny of Police Powers Panel, who said misconduct procedures "protect the police rather than the public".

== Series overview ==
The documentary series follows the Counter-Corruption Unit of the Avon and Somerset Police. During the four years of filming, 5,000 complaints are filed: 4,000 result in no action; 43 officers are dismissed; three officers are convicted on criminal charges. The series has three episodes, which are themed around mental health, race and sex crimes, respectively. They aired weekly from Monday 29 January 2024, in a 9 p.m. timeslot.

One woman is arrested under the grounds of disturbing the peace after police assess that she is attempting to jump from the Clifton Suspension Bridge. She is restrained by two female officers with a hand to her throat, a spit hood, and use of PAVA spray at close range. At the police station, she is pinned down and searched as she screams. The level of force used in this case is questioned by a Counter-Corruption Unit officer. In another incident, recorded on body camera footage, police are called to stop a disabled and mentally ill woman from leaving hospital during a crisis. Officers laugh about her allegedly urinating on herself and one says, "fucking bitch". Chief Constable Sarah Crew states her concerns with the incidents depicted and hopes for reform. One officer tells filmmakers that it is difficult to continually engage with vulnerable individuals experiencing mental health crises.

The documentary shows the potential racial profiling of a man who is "stopped and searched", assaulted, arrested, and strip searched. In a separate case, a young, black woman on a bus is PAVA sprayed while holding her toddler close to her in an incident involving six officers. A black man reports head and neck pain, confusion, and loss of balance as he is taken into custody. He is refused medical attention despite his symptoms of brain bleeding. An ambulance is called three hours after he collapses and vomits in a cell.

Constable Dave Lovell is found to have committed gross misconduct by an internal investigation over three instances of revenge porn involving different women. His pattern of sending images of his genitals to co-workers were well known within the force; he had continued as an officer after five investigations into his behaviour, with a verbal warning in 2006 and a written warning in 2016. Additionally, a female police community support officer (PCSO) accuses a male PCSO twice her age of sexual assault by groping. The female PCSO said she joined the police to "make positive change" after they had failed to resolve domestic violence in her childhood.

The officer Lee Cocking had sex on duty with an intoxicated woman on 24 December 2017 after offering to drive her home safely. Investigation into his conduct was previously reported in the media. The documentary reports his acquittal in a criminal misconduct trial and an internal police misconduct process. Cocking says that the drunk woman initiated sex and PTSD caused his passivity, in a defence that another officer calls "farcical". During the investigations, he is suspended on full pay for around five years. Afterwards, he retires on a full pension.

Some incidents are referred to the Independent Office for Police Conduct (IOPC), who have the power to remove officers from their jobs. In 2022, of 81,000 complaints against the UK police, under 1% led to misconduct proceedings. Overall, the programme features cases involving 16 officers and one PCSO. Two of these people were dismissed. Of the others, the police stated that three resigned, one retired, nine are "put on reflective practice" and two people are not found to have engaged in misconduct. Possible criminal assault in the Clifton Suspension Bridge incident was not referred to the Crown Prosecution Service (CPS).

== Production ==
The filmmakers Hugo Pettitt and Ashley Francis-Roy, who served as director, pitched the series to Channel 4 in 2020 as a documentary in the style of Line of Duty, a BBC police procedural based in the fictional Anti-Corruption Unit 12 (AC-12). Pettitt commented that they expected to find "an enjoyable journey of officers solving cases and crimes, rooting out individual officers", but according to Francis-Roy they discovered "a misconduct process that was unfit for purpose in addressing seriously concerning behaviour". The production company Story Films collected footage for four years. During this time, the murder of Sarah Everard by the constable Wayne Couzens and the prosecution of the serial rapist and police officer David Carrick led to public concern over police misconduct. A subsequent report by Louise Casey, Baroness Casey of Blackstock, found that the police were institutionally racist, misogynistic, and homophobic.

Documentary-makers in the genre often rely on police departments continuing to allow them filming access. Such programmes include 24 Hours in Police Custody, The Met: Policing London, and The Force. In Pettitt's case, work on Drugsland and the U.S. 24 Hours in Police Custody aided negotiation. According to the journalist Duncan Campbell, media coverage of police became more positive in the mid-1990s due to increased litigation by the Police Federation. Pettitt suggested he may previously have been guilty of accepting police accounts uncritically.

Francis-Roy said they produced a different style of documentary from these non-fiction series about policing, which he felt "tell stories of investigations with police heroes" as entertainment. The Channel 4 commissioner Sacha Mirzoeff said that other series suffer from covering cases retrospectively. The filmmakers were influenced instead by the 1982 documentary series Police. In one episode of Police, "A Complaint of Rape", a woman reporting rape is interrogated about her mental health, sex life and reproductive system, before officers decide she is lying.

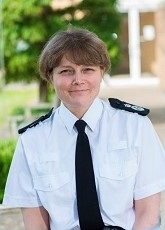
Chief Constable Sarah Crew

Chief Constable Sarah Crew—the first woman to hold that position after her November 2021 appointment—is featured in the documentary. She stated in June 2023 that the police were institutionally racist. A recent predecessor of hers resigned due to inappropriate conduct towards junior female officers. Crew said that the documentary showed the force was confronting its issues. She hoped it would "improve trust and confidence" and the "ability to police by consent". A member of the Professional Standards Department who is featured said that, from her 21 years' experience, "the culture that once existed is no longer acceptable". Mark Shelford, the local Police and Crime Commissioner, said the "very courageous" decision to allow filming accompanied an increase in misconduct cases, which showed the system worked.

Pettitt said members of the public were reluctant to participate as filmmakers were seen "as another arm of the police". Francis-Roy commented that the police's reaction to incidents in the programme was "a million miles away" from the community response and that victims often saw complaints as a "pointless exercise". Francis-Roy said they heard from many people who did not report incidents due to mistrust of the Professional Standards Department.

== Responses ==
Spokespeople for the Avon and Somerset Police said that since the documentary was filmed, "significant changes" were made to the misconduct process and that officers had received additional training. They described implementing a new approach to sexual offence investigations, Operation Bluestone. Crew commented that "recovery work" was needed to counteract falling public trust in police, that police misconduct was the "exception", that transparency was "right" and that removal of a "minority of wrongdoers" required "concerted effort" from all officers.

The Police Federation concluded, from surveying 400 members of the Avon and Somerset Police, that most officers opposed the force's co-operation with the documentary-makers and felt "utterly betrayed" and "unsupported". The vice-chair said that the police is "the most accountable of public services" and "fairness and balance" is needed when scrutinising policing. The local chair said that police were increasingly summoned to incidents they had not been trained to deal with, such as mental health crises, and that investigations into officers were increasingly biased towards dismissal "to bring back public confidence".

Desmond Brown, chair of the force's Lammy Group (set up in response to The Lammy Review), said that he was "appalled, angry, but, unfortunately, not surprised" by the issues depicted, as they had been present since he joined and "did not seem to be going anywhere".

The CEO of the sexual abuse charity SARSAS said in reaction that systemic change, additional vetting processes and specialist training by sexual violence services was needed within the police. She connected this to the charity's experience that most people they work with do not feel they can make police reports "for fear of not being believed or taken seriously", or have "negative experiences with the police".

The Independent Scrutiny of Police Powers Panel (ISOPPP), a volunteer organisation set up by the Avon and Somerset Police, said that "radical overhaul" of the system was needed as the Professional Standards Department and IOPC "protect the police rather than the public", which undermines the principle of policing by consent.

The programme garnered ratings of four stars in The Daily Telegraph, and three stars in The Guardian. Gerard Gilbert of i found the series "eye-opening". Writing in the Irish Independent, Pat Stacey commented that the "hardworking" Counter-Corruption Unit are limited in jurisdiction and asked: "How rotten does a rotten apple have to be before it's thrown out?" Similarly, Deputy Mayor Asher Craig told the Royal Television Society that the IOPC is "marking their own homework" without outside scrutiny. In The Times, Sean O'Neill said the system appeared "slow, bureaucratic and broken". The Daily Telegraph reviewer Anita Singh did not believe the programme would increase public trust in the police. After the first episode, The Guardian's Jack Seale wrote that the series should make a "more focused" argument for police reform.

== Awards and nominations ==
Year	Award	Category	Result	Ref.
2025	British Academy Television Awards	Best Factual Series	Won	
