= Bridgwater Borough Police =

Defunct police force

Bridgwater Borough Police was a police force responsible for policing the borough of Bridgwater, Somerset in England from 1836 to 1940. The force was formed as a result of the Municipal Corporations Act 1835, Bridgwater being one of the 178 boroughs originally named in the Act. A government return from 1852 shows that the police force at that time had 5 police officers at a cost to the borough of £245 and 18 shillings for the previous year. Throughout its 104 year history its establishment was never more than 20 officers. In 1940 the force was abolished and voluntarily became part of Somerset Constabulary. Today the area is policed by Avon and Somerset Constabulary.
