= Glastonbury Borough Police =

Defunct police force

Glastonbury Borough Police was the police force responsible for policing the borough of Glastonbury in England between 1837 and 1856.

Glastonbury was one of the original 178 boroughs named in the Municipal Corporations Act 1835 which required boroughs to appoint a watch committee with a duty to appoint sufficient numbers of constables. As a result, Glastonbury Borough Police came into existence in 1837 with two sergeants and two constables to patrol the borough. A government report in 1852 stated that the force only had two constables to police the borough at an annual cost of only £6. It is therefore believed that the force was part-time.

The county in which Glastonbury is situated, Somerset, had no modern police force until 1 September 1856 when Somerset Constabulary was formed. Glastonbury Borough Police was consolidated into the new Somerset Constabulary at around the same time as the county force commenced operations. The headquarters of the new county force was situated in Glastonbury initially.

Today, Glastonbury is policed by the successor of Somerset Constabulary, Avon and Somerset Constabulary.

== See also ==
- List of defunct law enforcement agencies in the United Kingdom
