= Nick Gargan =

English chief constable

Chief Constable Nick Gargan QPM
- Born: Nick Gargan
- Occupation: Strategic Consultant
- Known for: Former Chief Constable, Avon and Somerset Constabulary, Chief Executive National Policing Improvement Agency
- Spouse: Divorced
- Children: 2

Nicholas "Nick" Gargan is a former chief constable in England, who now runs his own consultancy company, Nick Gargan Consulting.

He was appointed chief constable of Avon and Somerset Constabulary in March 2013, and immediately embarked upon an ambitious, and (in some quarters) controversial programme of reform. In May 2014, he was suspended because of allegations made by whistleblowers of inappropriate behaviour and comments towards female officers and staff. The ensuing disciplinary panel found him guilty of eight counts of misconduct but recommended that he be reinstated. Following the intervention of the Police and Crime Commissioner, he resigned from his post in October 2015.

== Early life ==
Gargan studied French and politics at the University of Leicester.

== Career ==
Gargan joined Leicestershire Police in 1988 under the Graduate Entry Scheme, before transferring to Thames Valley Police in 2006.

Gargan moved to the National Policing Improvement Agency (NPIA) in early 2010 as deputy chief executive, and became acting chief executive and acting chief constable when Chief Constable Peter Neyroud began a Home Office project in September 2010. He oversaw the transfer of its functions into other policing bodies before its disestablishment. Gargan was awarded the Queen's Police Medal in the New Year's Honours List 2012. He was forced to return the Honour in 2017 for bringing the police service into disrepute.

=== Chief constable, Avon and Somerset Constabulary ===
Gargan was appointed as chief constable of the Avon and Somerset Constabulary in March 2013, following the retirement of Colin Port.

==== Suspension ====
In mid-May 2014, Gargan was suspended by Police and Crime Commissioner Sue Mountstevens, as a result of allegations of 'inappropriate behaviour towards female officers and staff'. The enquiry into the allegations was referred to the Independent Police Complaints Commission (IPCC). During the period of Gargan's suspension and following his resignation, the force was led by the Deputy Chief Constable, John Long, and subsequently by Gareth Morgan, following Long's retirement

On 9 July 2015, Gargan was found guilty of eight counts of misconduct, none of which related to the original allegations. During the course of the investigation, which lasted more than 16 months, the IPCC found that he had sent inappropriate messages from his work phone, improperly interfered with a recruitment process and passed on confidential e-mails. All charges of gross misconduct, and of inappropriate behaviour, were dismissed. The disciplinary panel found they did not justify dismissal: consequently they recommended that he return to work. In line with the panel's recommendations, his suspension was immediately lifted and a phased return to his role leading Avon and Somerset Constabulary was planned. However, there was vocal local resistance to the idea of Gargan returning to work: the Police Federation of England and Wales issued a statement questioning whether the public could have "confidence in his leadership" following the guilty findings of the misconduct case, and a petition was set up campaigning for his resignation. Three former Chief Constables of Avon & Somerset Police called for his resignation on 6 August 2015 saying “Leadership should be inspiring and not an embarrassment.”

Ultimately, it was felt that the duration of Gargan's suspension made his position untenable. On 16 October 2015, Gargan resigned from Avon and Somerset Constabulary. He was awarded three months' salary in lieu of notice.

Over the course of Gargan's suspension and immediately following his resignation a number of local MPs questioned the handling of the situation, the length of time the investigation took (at considerable expense to the tax-payers of Avon and Somerset), and the way the local media, and social media, contributed to the ending of his career in policing, calling the process a "witch-hunt" and "trial by media". The issue was the subject of a House of Commons Debate called by the MP for North East Somerset Jacob Rees-Mogg on 29 October 2015. There was also suspicion that the allegations and public campaign against Gargan had been orchestrated by elements within Avon and Somerset and more widely across policing who resented his leadership style. The case is seen to have highlighted weaknesses and risks within the current legislation that defines the respective roles and responsibilities of PCCs and chief constables, as well as raising questions about the remit and competence of the IPCC, as detailed in a blog by Gavin Hales, deputy director of criminal justice think-tank The Police Foundation.

=== Post-police career ===
Gargan took up a four-month contract with the global security company G4S in December 2015, as a programme director in its justice health division. He subsequently established Nick Gargan Consulting. As of 2021, he is a board member at Enlighten.Org. Gargan was stripped of his Queen's Police Medal in 2017 by the Honours Forfeiture Committee for disreputable conduct.

== Honours ==

Ribbon	Description	Notes
	Queen's Police Medal (QPM)	2012 New Year Honours List; Revoked on 4 December 2017
	Queen Elizabeth II Golden Jubilee Medal	2002; UK version of this medal
	Queen Elizabeth II Diamond Jubilee Medal	2012; UK version of this medal
	Police Long Service and Good Conduct Medal	

Police appointments
Preceded by Colin Port	Chief Constable of the Avon and Somerset Constabulary; 2013–2015	Succeeded by Andy Marsh
