= Sue Mountstevens =

British politician (born 1955)

Sue Mountstevens OBE

Avon and Somerset Police and Crime Commissioner
- In office 22 November 2012 – 12 May 2021
- Preceded by: Office created
- Succeeded by: Mark Shelford

Personal details
- Born: 1955 (age 70–71)
- Party: None (independent)
- Spouse: Stephen Robertson
- Children: 3

Susan Robertson, OBE (née Mountstevens; born 1955) is a British independent politician. From November 2012 to May 2021, she served as the Avon and Somerset Police and Crime Commissioner. She is the first person to hold the post and was first elected on 15 November 2012, having stood as an independent candidate.

== Biography ==
Before being elected as the police and crime commissioner, Mountstevens was an independent member of Avon and Somerset Police Authority (the body which, as Police and Crime Commissioner, she replaces), vice-chair of the Independent Monitoring Board for Bristol Prison and was a magistrate for 15 years. Earlier in her career she was a director of the Mountstevens Bakeries chain.

She Is married to Stephen Robertson and has three children and lives near Pill, North Somerset.

== Election as Police and Crime Commissioner ==
Mountstevens has stood twice in elections to be the Avon and Somerset Police and Crime Commissioner.

=== 2012 Avon and Somerset Police and Crime Commissioner election ===
Mountstevens was elected to the role of Avon and Somerset Police and Crime Commissioner in the elections held on 15 November 2012, which used the supplementary vote system. She stood as an Independent and was elected on the second round, after second preference votes were counted. Mountstevens was the only Commissioner elected with a mandate exceeding 10% of the electorate, having been chosen by 10.1% of those eligible to vote. She took the oath of office on 21 November 2012.

=== 2016 Avon and Somerset Police and Crime Commissioner election ===
Mountstevens sought re-election for the role of Avon and Somerset Police and Crime Commissioner in the 2016 England and Wales Police and Crime Commissioner elections, which were held on 5 May 2016. She was re-elected to the position, having received 26% of first preference votes, and a total of 54.1% of the total votes, after second preference votes were counted.

== Decisions made in office ==
One of the powers of Police and Crime Commissioners is to appoint or dismiss the chief constable. On her second day in office, Mountstevens decided to invite applications for appointment to that role, to be taken up after the contract of the incumbent, Colin Port, expired in early 2013, rather than extending his appointment. Port then decided to retire rather than re-apply for the position. In January 2013, Mountstevens announced Nick Gargan as Port's successor; the appointment was subsequently approved by the relevant police and crime panel, and Gargan took up the appointment in March 2013.

After allegations of gross misconduct in May 2014, Chief Constable Nick Gargan was suspended for 18 months. In July 2015 he was cleared of the charges of gross misconduct, but was found guilty of eight counts of misconduct, and in August 2015 was handed eight final written warnings.

In October 2014, Mountstevens apologised for telling Gargan the name of the female complainant who had accused him of improper behaviour, after the Police and Crime Panel found Mountstevens had made a "serious error of judgement" in breaching her own code of conduct.

On 19 August 2015, Mountstevens accused Gargan of abusing his authority, and losing the confidence of staff and the public, and asked him to resign. In her statement, Mountstevens said Gargan was being required to resign or retire “due to a lack of confidence by local people, police officers and staff in his position as leader of Avon and Somerset constabulary”.

In May 2020, Mountstevens appointed a declared “Independent” PCC candidate, John Smith, as her Deputy PCC. Smith resigned as the chief executive officer at her office in December 2019. He then declared himself as a candidate to run as Mountstevens’ replacement following her announcement that she would not stand again in May 2020 election that were cancelled due to Coronavirus. The role was then created for Smith following the announcement the elections were cancelled.

The appointment proved incredibly controversial with a number of scrutiny panel members citing a lack of process, negative impacts on a democratic process (the PCC elections) and cronyism behind the decision.

In July 2020, Mountstevens was reported for failing to disclose the business activities of her husband. This was in relation to a complaints that Mountstevens and Smith had abused their roles to cover up fraud at Lloyd's Bank in Bristol, which both have a personal and professional relationships with.

November 2020 saw Mountstevens found guilty by her Police and Crime Panel for “manipulating” the Chief Constable, Andy Marsh, into writing a letter for John Smith as part of his appointment to the Deputy role she created for him despite his declared candidacy.

On 8 January 2021, Mountstevens announced that she would not be seeking re-election in the 2021 England and Wales Police and Crime Commissioner Elections.

She was appointed Officer of the Order of the British Empire (OBE) in the 2022 New Year Honours for services to the community in Bristol, Somerset and South Gloucestershire.
