= Somerset Constabulary =

Defunct police force

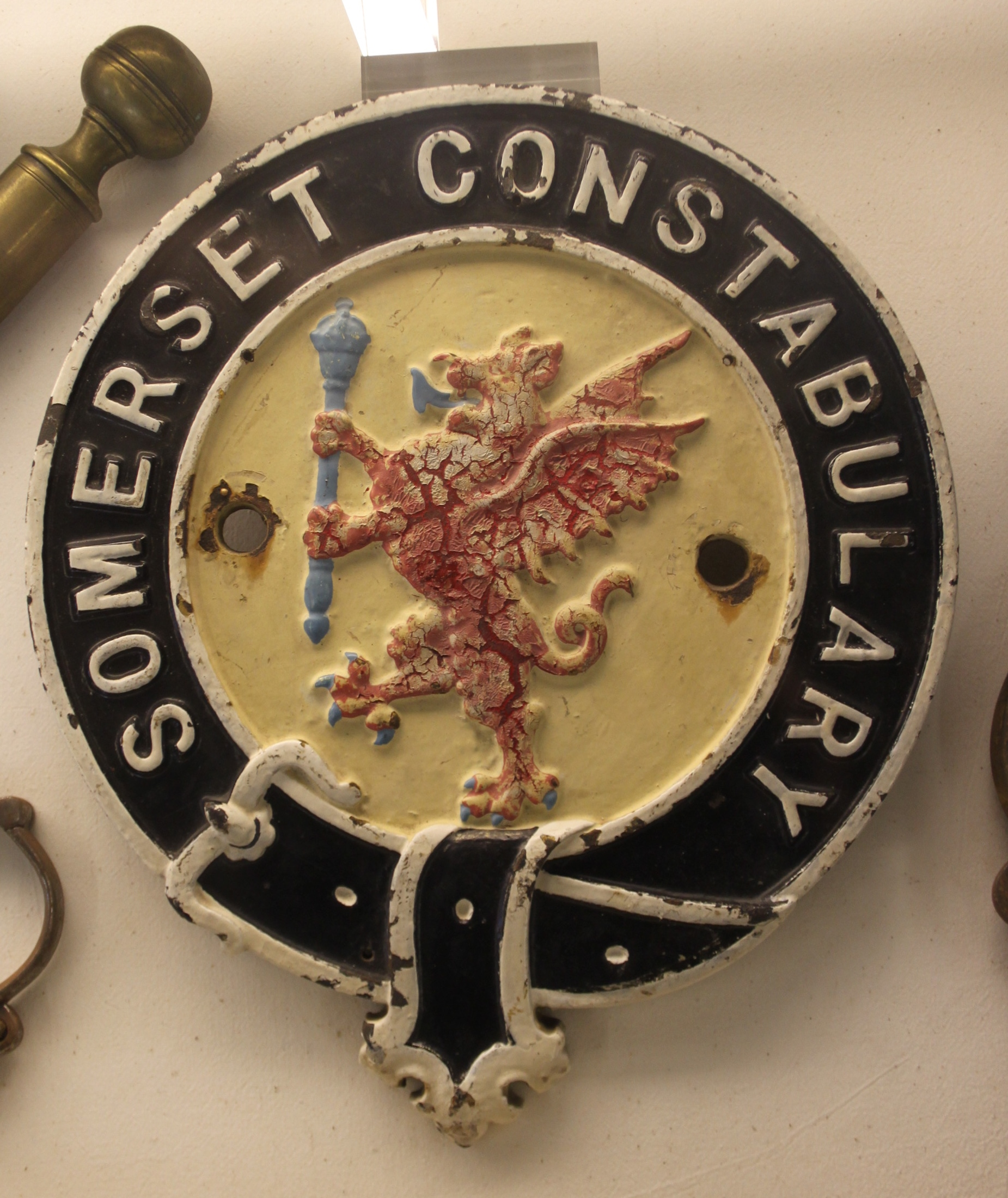
Somerset Constabulary Badge on display at King John's Hunting Lodge, Axbridge

Somerset Constabulary was the police force responsible for policing the county of Somerset, England, between 1856 and 1967. It was formed as a result of the County and Borough Police Act 1856. This act made it compulsory for the county authorities to form a county police force which up until this point had not been done. During its 111 year history, five smaller police forces within Somerset were merged into Somerset Constabulary. These were Wells City Police and Glastonbury Borough Police in 1856, Yeovil Borough Police in 1859, Chard Borough Police in 1889 and Bridgwater Borough Police in 1940. Somerset Constabulary was amalgamated with Bath City Police on 1 January 1967 to become the Somerset and Bath Constabulary. As a result of the Local Government Act 1972 this new force was short lived, lasting just 7 years when on 1 April 1974 it became part of Avon and Somerset Constabulary which polices the area to this day.

== Chief Constables ==
Somerset Constabulary

- 1856–1884 : Valentine Goold
- 1884–1908 : Captain Charles German Allison
- 1908-1939 : Lieutenant-Colonel Herbert Charles Metcalfe
- 1939-1955 : James Edward Ryall, OBE
- 1955–1967 : Kenneth Walter Lawrence Steel

Somerset and Bath Constabulary

- 1967–1974 : Kenneth Walter Lawrence Steel

== Officers killed in the line of duty ==
The Police Roll of Honour Trust lists and commemorates all British police officers killed in the line of duty. It lists 16 Somerset Constabulary officers who were killed/died during its existence including:

- PC Robert Hill, 1851, who died as a result of stab injuries sustained on duty in 1847.
- PC Alfred Pavey, 1861, who was killed as a result of injuries received when bludgeoned by two burglars.
- PC Kenneth Edwin Snook, 1942, killed by enemy action while on duty during an air raid.
