= Clare Moody =

British Labour politician

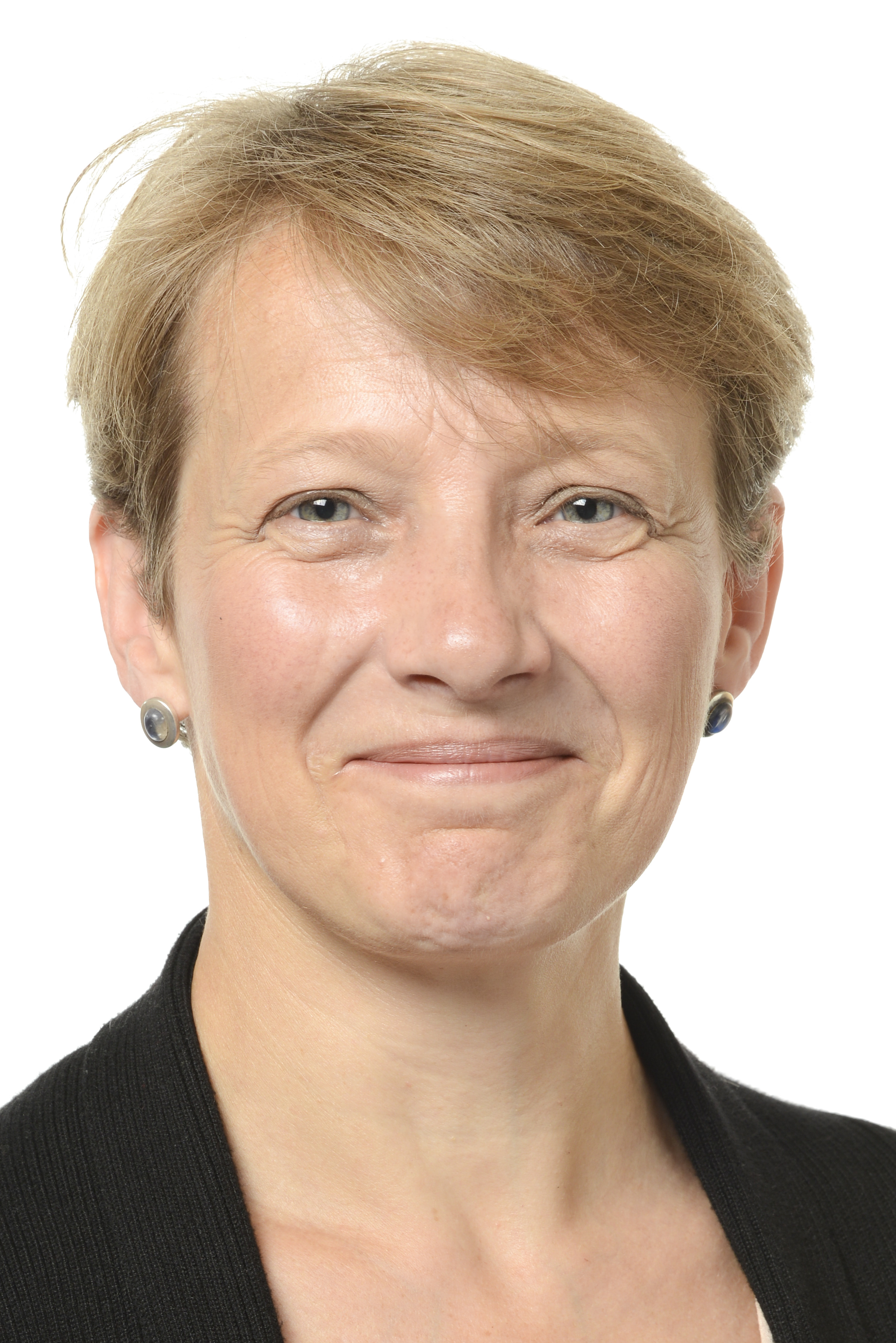

Police and Crime Commissioner for Avon and Somerset
- Incumbent
- Assumed office 9 May 2024
- Preceded by: Mark Shelford

Member of the European Parliament for South West England
- In office 1 July 2014 – 1 July 2019

Personal details
- Born: Clare Miranda Moody; 30 October 1965 (age 60) Chipping Norton, Oxfordshire, England
- Party: Labour
- Education: University of Kent
- Website: Official website

Clare Miranda Moody (born 30 October 1965) is a British politician serving as Police and Crime Commissioner for Avon and Somerset since 2024. A member of the Labour Party, she served as a Member of the European Parliament (MEP) for South West England from 2014 to 2019.

== Early life and career ==
Clare Miranda Moody was born on 30 October 1965 in Chipping Norton, Oxfordshire to Joan and Raymond Moody. Brought up in Burford, her father served as town mayor and both her parents were Conservative Party activists.

Moody trained as a secretary. Later she studied industrial relations at the University of Kent and began her career in trade unionism at the Banking, Insurance and Finance Union (BIFU). BIFU went through several amalgamations to become UNIFI, Amicus, and later Unite, where she worked as a regional officer in Bournemouth.

Moody worked in the Number 10 Policy Unit under Prime Minister Gordon Brown. She was the Labour candidate for Salisbury, a safe Conservative seat, at the 2005 general election. Moody also stood to become the inaugural Wiltshire Police and Crime Commissioner, reaching the second round as Labour's candidate in the 2012 election.

== European Parliamentary career ==
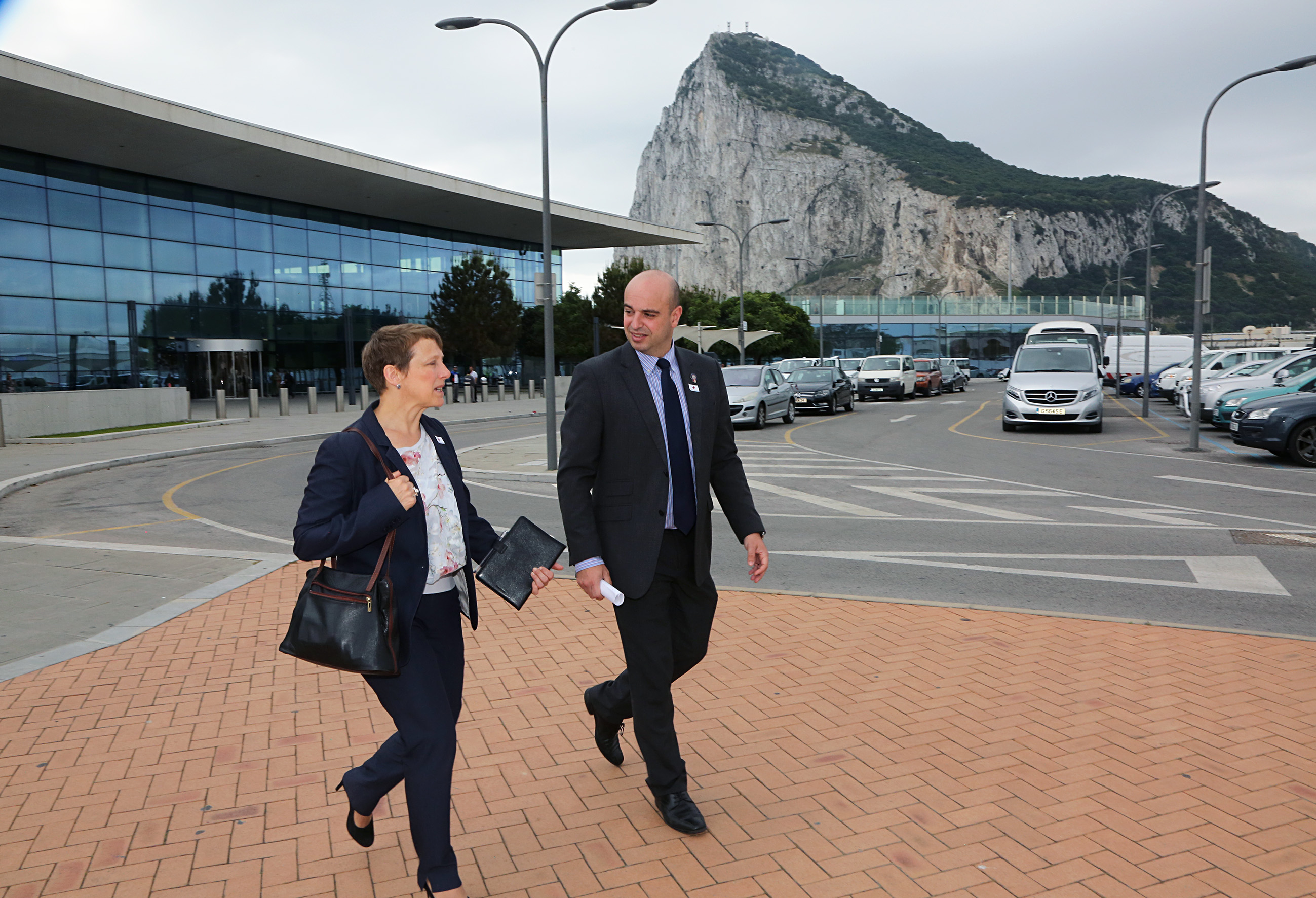
Moody visiting Gibraltar in 2017

Moody unsuccessfully contested South West England in the 2004 European Parliament election, in fourth position on the Labour Party list. However, she was elected as a Member of European Parliament for the region in the May 2014 elections, now placed as the lead list candidate.

During her tenure in the European Parliament, Moody served as vice-chair of the Subcommittee on Security and Defence. She has also been a member of the Budget, Foreign Affairs, Industry, Research and Energy, and Women's Rights committees.

She was a MEP delegate to the Euronest Parliamentary Assembly, a group of former Soviet Union state parliaments in Eastern Europe aspiring to closer political and economic ties with the European Union. She was co-chair of the Friends of Georgia group, and worked on the EU-Georgia Association Agreement through her Foreign Affairs committee membership. Moody voted in favour of the Directive on Copyright in the Digital Single Market in 2019, despite concerns that the legislation enforced censorship on EU internet users.

Moody lost her seat in the 2019 European Parliament election, when no Labour candidate was returned in South West England.

== Post-Parliamentary career ==
Moody was appointed Political Director at public relations company Grayling in 2019, a subsidiary of Huntsworth, where she later became Senior Strategic Director. In 2021, she was appointed co-CEO of the human rights and equality charity Equally Ours.

In 2022, Moody unsuccessfully stood to become the Labour Parliamentary candidate for Stroud. She was later selected as the Labour candidate for the 2024 Avon and Somerset Police and Crime Commissioner election.

== Police and crime commissioner ==
Moody was elected Avon and Somerset Police and Crime Commissioner for the Labour and Co-operative Party on 3 May 2024.

In February 2025, Moody proposed a 5% increase in the police precept part of council tax, which will raise an additional £8.5 million for the force. The councils' police and crime panel approved the increase. About 250 of 2,800 support staff had already been reduced, and further cuts of £6.4 million were planned for the following year. Moody stated the force still faced an £11 million deficit by 2030.

== Political views ==
Moody supported the remain campaign in the 2016 EU membership referendum, and supported a delay before invoking Article 50 to allow for negotiations post-referendum. She supported Britain staying in the European single market and the Customs Union post-Brexit. She chaired the Labour Movement for Europe from 2017 to 2019, and campaigned for a second referendum on the final Brexit deal.

In 2018, Moody argued that the EU and UK defence and security relationship should remain close despite Brexit, and that closer European Union–NATO relations would assist in that and reduce wasteful duplication of effort.

She credited the loss of her European Parliamentary seat in 2019 to Labour's Brexit position, arguing that the party needed to adopt a clear pro-EU stance. In 2023, The New European reported that she acknowledged Britain would not rejoin in the next parliament, but believed rejoining "will become a question again. For a growth agenda, we have to fix our relationship with the EU."

Moody supported Yvette Cooper in the 2015 Labour Party leadership election. During the leadership challenge to Jeremy Corbyn in June 2016, she supported calls for his resignation.

== Personal life ==
Moody has resided in Salisbury, Wiltshire. She has a son.
