= Avon and Somerset Police and Crime Commissioner =

Elected official in the West of England

- Incumbent; Clare Moody since 9 May 2024
- Police and crime commissioner of Avon and Somerset Police
- Reports to: Avon and Somerset Police and Crime Panel
- Appointer: Electorate of Bristol, Bath and North East Somerset, North Somerset, South Gloucestershire and Somerset
- Term length: Four years
- Constituting instrument: Police Reform and Social Responsibility Act 2011
- Precursor: Avon and Somerset Police Authority
- Inaugural holder: Sue Mountstevens
- Formation: 22 November 2012
- Deputy: Deputy Police and Crime Commissioner
- Salary: £88,600
- Website: www.avonandsomerset-pcc.gov.uk

The Avon and Somerset Police and Crime Commissioner is the police and crime commissioner, an elected official tasked with setting out the way crime is tackled by Avon and Somerset Police in the English unitary authorities of Bristol, Bath and North East Somerset, North Somerset, South Gloucestershire and Somerset. The post was created in November 2012, following an election held on 15 November 2012, and replaced the Avon and Somerset Police Authority. Clare Moody was elected to the role in the May 2024 election.

The most recent Avon and Somerset PCC election took place on Thursday 2 May 2024. This election used the first-past-the-post voting system, changed from the supplementary vote system used in 2021.

The Office of the Police and Crime Commissioner has about 31 staff.

== List of Avon and Somerset Police and Crime Commissioners ==
Name	Political party	From	To
Sue Mountstevens	Independent	22 November 2012	12 May 2021
Mark Shelford	Conservative	13 May 2021	8 May 2024
Clare Moody	Labour	9 May 2024	Incumbent

== Election results ==
=== 2024 Avon and Somerset Police and Crime Commissioner election ===
2024 Avon and Somerset Police and Crime Commissioner election
Party	Candidate	Votes	%	±%
Labour Co-op	Clare Moody	95,982	32.3	+8.6
Conservative	Mark Shelford*	91,006	30.6	−4.1
Green	Katy Grant	64,623	21.7	+5.3
Liberal Democrats	Benet Allen	45,864	15.4	+2.0
Turnout		300,744	23.09	−7.63
Rejected ballots		3,262	1.09	
Labour gain from Conservative		Swing		

=== 2021 Avon and Somerset Police and Crime Commissioner election ===
Avon and Somerset Police and Crime Commissioner election, 2021
Party	Candidate	1st round		2nd round			1st round votesTransfer votes, 2nd round
Party	Candidate	Total	Of round	Transfers	Total	Of round	1st round votesTransfer votes, 2nd round
Conservative	Mark Shelford	136,988	34.7%	24,331	161,319	52.4%	
Labour	Kerry Barker	93,495	23.7%	52,798	146,293	47.6%	
Green	Cleo Lake	64,790	16.4%				
Liberal Democrats	Heather Shearer	52,839	13.4%				
Independent	John Smith	46,379	11.8%				
Turnout		400,891	30.72%	Rejected ballots: 6,400			
Conservative gain from Independent							

=== 2016 Avon and Somerset Police and Crime Commissioner election ===
Avon and Somerset Police and Crime Commissioner election, 2016
Party	Candidate	1st round		2nd round			1st round votesTransfer votes, 2nd round
Party	Candidate	Total	Of round	Transfers	Total	Of round	1st round votesTransfer votes, 2nd round
Independent	Sue Mountstevens	82,708	26.1%	35,839	118,547	54.1%	
Labour	Kerry Barker	75,538	23.8%	25,027	100,565	45.9%	
Conservative	Mark Weston	61,335	19.3%				
UKIP	Aaron Foot	28,038	8.8%				
Liberal Democrats	Paul Crossley	23,429	7.4%				
Green	Chris Briton	23,414	7.4%				
Independent	Kevin Phillips	22,667	7.2%				
Turnout		317,129	26.0%	Rejected ballots: 8,629			
Independent hold							

=== 2012 Avon and Somerset Police and Crime Commissioner election ===
Avon and Somerset Police Commissioner election, 2012
Party	Candidate	1st round		2nd round			1st round votesTransfer votes, 2nd round
Party	Candidate	Total	Of round	Transfers	Total	Of round	1st round votesTransfer votes, 2nd round
Independent	Sue Mountstevens	83,985	35.81%	41,719	125,704	64.95	
Conservative	Ken Maddock	57,094	24.35%	10,748	67,842	35.05	
Labour	John Savage	49,989	21.32%				
Liberal Democrats	Pete Levy	43,446	18.53%				
Turnout		243,963	19.58%	Rejected ballots: 9,190			
Independent win							
