= Mark Shelford =

British Conservative politician

Avon and Somerset Police and Crime Commissioner
- In office 13 May 2021 – 8 May 2024
- Preceded by: Sue Mountstevens
- Succeeded by: Clare Moody

Personal details
- Born: November 1961 (age 64)
- Party: Conservative
- Website: www.markshelford.org.uk

Military service
- Allegiance: United Kingdom
- Branch/service: British Army
- Years of service: 1981–2013
- Rank: Lieutenant Colonel
- Unit: 5th Inniskilling Dragoon Guards
- Battles/wars: Gulf War; Northern Ireland; Afghanistan

Mark Grosvenor McNeill Shelford (born November 1961) is a British Conservative politician and former lieutenant colonel in the British Army, who served as the Avon and Somerset Police and Crime Commissioner from 2021 until 2024.

== Biography ==
Shelford served in the British Army between 1981 and 2013, eventually retiring at the rank of lieutenant colonel. This included service in the Gulf War as the aide-de-camp to Brigadier Patrick Cordingley.

Shelford was elected to Bath and North East Somerset Council for the Lyncombe ward in the 2015 election. He held this position until 2019, where he was defeated by the Liberal Democrat candidate. He is also a member of the Avon and Somerset Police and Crime Panel, and the Avon Fire Authority.

== Police and Crime Commissioner ==
Shelford was elected on the second round of voting in the 2021 PCC election.

In 2022, along with other South West PCCs, Shelford announced that police on the region would crack down on dealers and users of recreational drugs. Some experts criticised the PCC's calls to reclassify cannabis from Class B to Class A.

In 2023, Avon and Somerset Chief Constable, Sarah Crew, claimed that the force had institutional racism. Shelford endorsed her claims and said he supported her leadership.

Shelford supported the chief constable in enabling the Channel 4 series To Catch a Copper to have behind-the-scenes access at the police Counter-Corruption Unit. Some members of the Avon and Somerset Police Federation said they felt "utterly betrayed" and "unsupported" by this decision and the resultant program.

Shelford supported the re-establishment of local police stations in the area, which had been cut during budget cuts in the 2010s, such as in Bath.

Shelford stood in the 2024 PCC election, but was defeated for re-election by the Labour party.
